= 2016 Republican Party presidential primaries =

- February 1 to June 7, 2016

2,472 delegates to the Republican National Convention 1,237 delegate votes needed to win
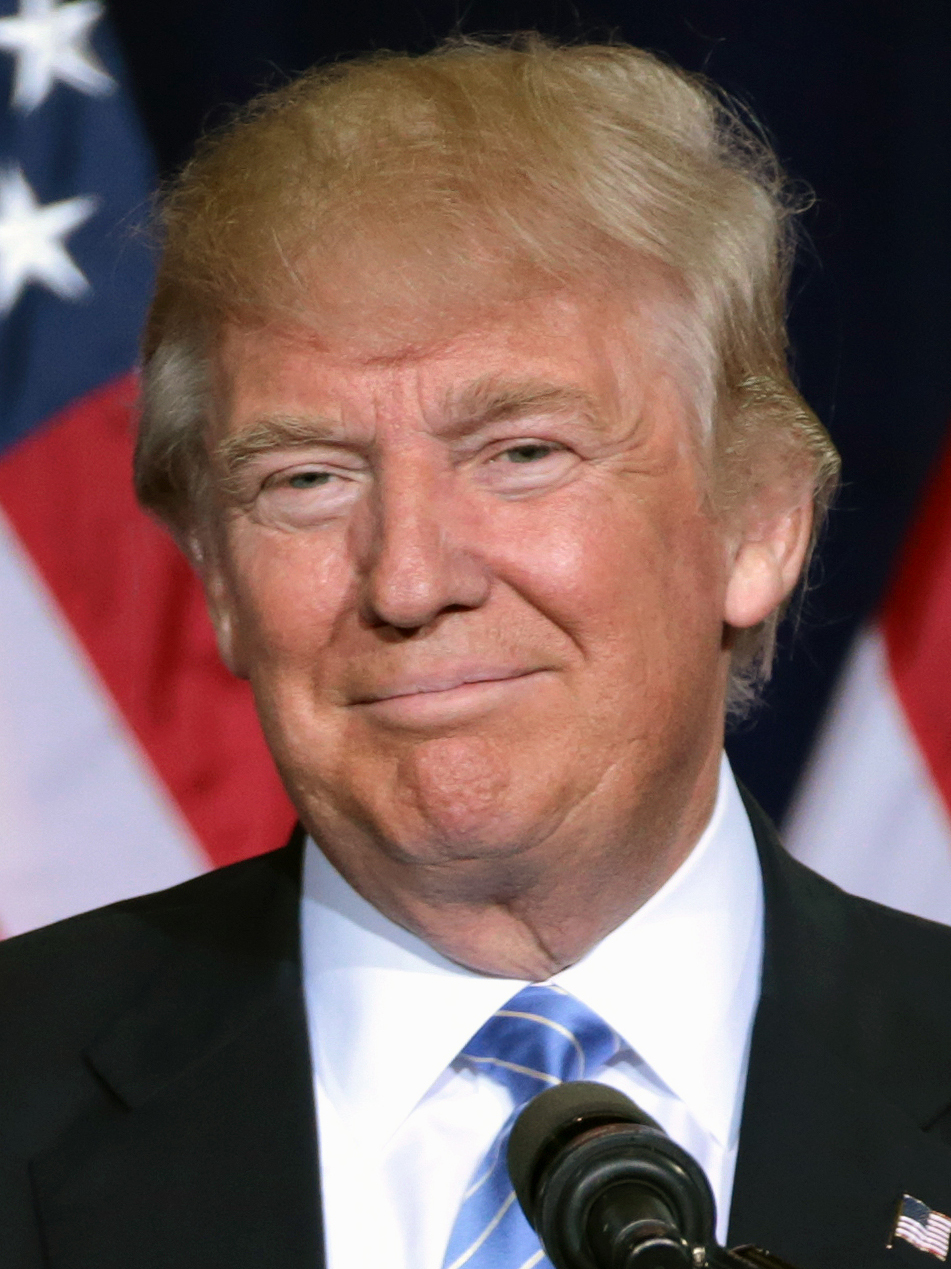

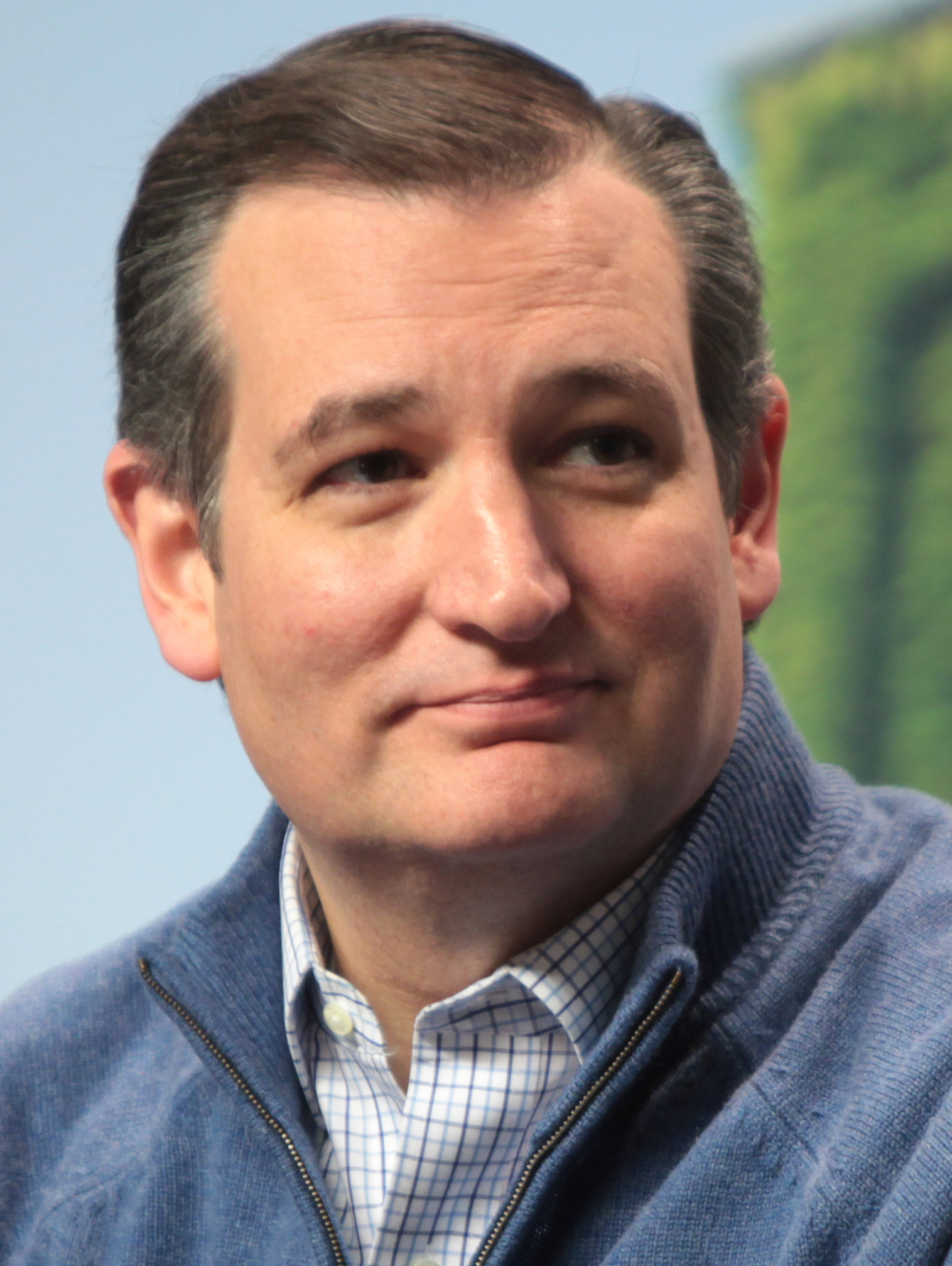

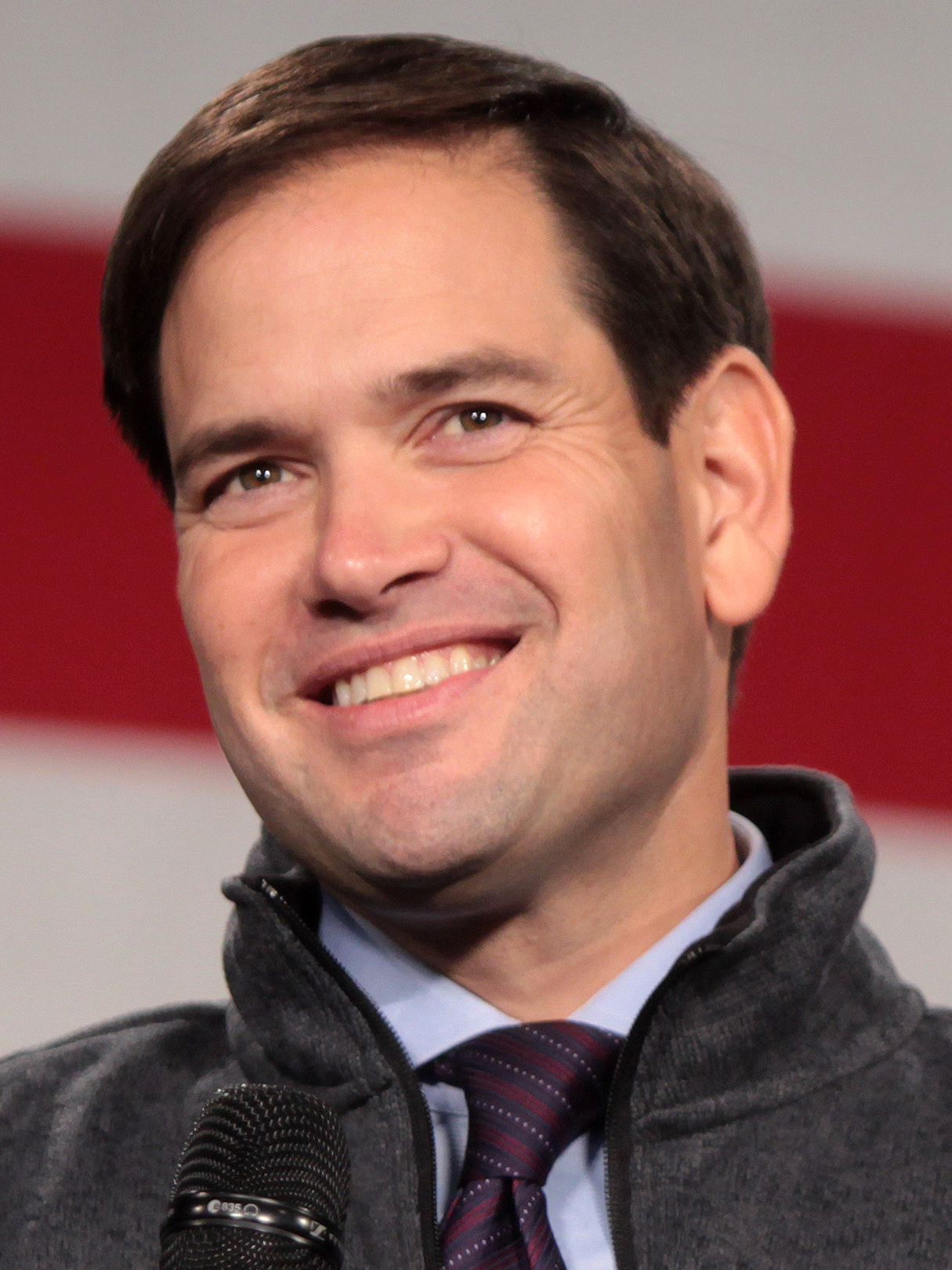

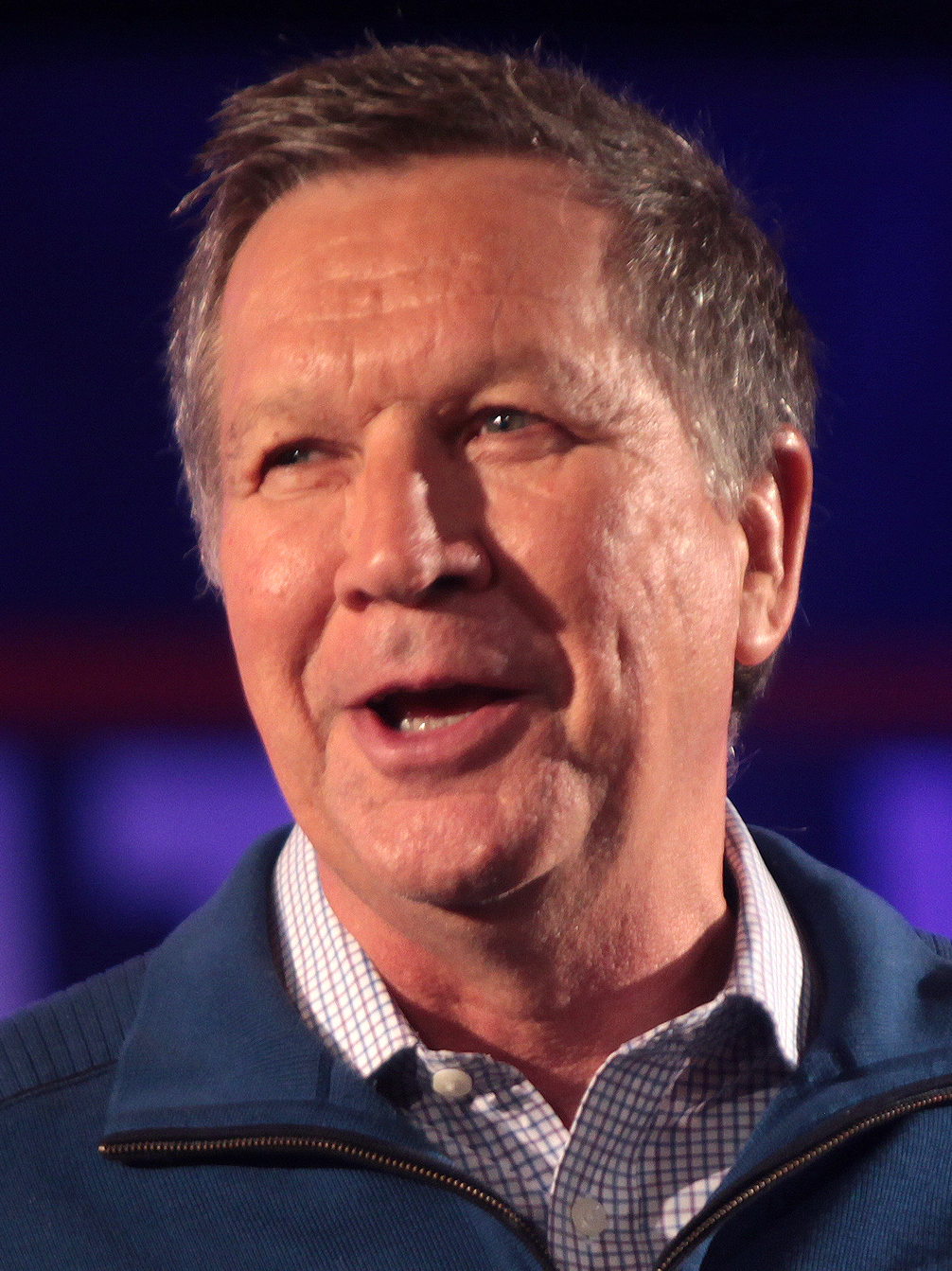
Candidate	Donald Trump	Ted Cruz
Home state	New York	Texas
Delegate count	1,441	551
Contests won	41	11
Popular vote	14,015,993	7,822,100
Percentage	44.9%	25.1%
Candidate	Marco Rubio	John Kasich
Home state	Florida	Ohio
Delegate count	173	161
Contests won	3	1
Popular vote	3,515,576	4,290,448
Percentage	11.3%	13.8%

Donald Trump
Ted Cruz
Uncommitted
Marco Rubio
John Kasich
Tie
Previous Republican nominee
Mitt Romney
Republican nominee
Donald Trump

Presidential primaries and caucuses of the Republican Party took place within all 50 U.S. states, the District of Columbia, and five U.S. territories between February 1 and June 7, 2016. These elections selected the 2,472 delegates that were sent to the Republican National Convention. Businessman and reality television personality Donald Trump won the Republican nomination for president of the United States.

A total of 17 major candidates entered the race. Prior to the 2020 Democratic Party presidential primaries, this was the largest presidential primary field for any political party in American history. From early in the primary season, the race was characterized as a wide and diverse contest with no clear frontrunner. Early polling leaders included former Florida governor Jeb Bush and Wisconsin governor Scott Walker, among others. The race was disrupted by the entry of Trump in June 2015, who quickly and unexpectedly rose to lead polls for the rest of the primary season, with the exception of a period in the fall when neurosurgeon Ben Carson experienced a surge in support.

U.S. Senator Ted Cruz of Texas won the Iowa caucuses, while Trump won the New Hampshire and South Carolina primaries as well as the Nevada caucuses. On Super Tuesday, Trump and Cruz traded states with Trump receiving the plurality of the day's delegates. From March 16 to May 3, only three candidates remained in the race: Trump, Cruz, and Ohio Governor John Kasich. Cruz won four Western contests and won in Wisconsin, keeping open a credible path to denying Trump the nomination on first ballot with 1,237 delegates. Trump scored landslide victories in his home state of New York and five northeastern states in April, before taking every delegate in the Indiana primary on May 3. Without any further chances of forcing a contested convention, Cruz suspended his campaign. Trump was declared the presumptive Republican nominee by Republican National Committee chairman Reince Priebus on May 3. Kasich ended his campaign the following day. After winning the Washington primary and gaining support from unbound North Dakota delegates on May 26, Trump passed the threshold of 1,237 delegates required to guarantee his nomination. By the end of the primary voting process, Trump had a commanding lead in the number of pledged delegates, ensuring a very smooth process for being declared the nominee. Trump received over 14 million votes, the most for any candidate in Republican primary history. However, at 44.95%, Trump had the lowest percentage of the popular primary vote for a major party nominee since the 1988 Democratic Party presidential primaries.

On July 19, 2016, Trump and his running mate, Indiana governor Mike Pence, were officially nominated as the Republican presidential and vice presidential candidates at the Republican National Convention. The pair won the general election on November 8, defeating the Democratic Party ticket of former secretary of state Hillary Clinton and her running mate, U.S. Senator from Virginia Tim Kaine, despite the Democratic ticket consistently leading in polls.

== Candidates and results ==
Seventeen major candidates were listed in major independent nationwide polls and filed as candidates with the Federal Election Commission. A total of 2,472 delegates attended the 2016 Republican National Convention, and the winning candidate needed a simple majority of 1,237 votes to become the Republican nominee.

=== Delegate breakdown ===
Donald Trump: 1441 delegates Ted Cruz: 551 delegates Marco Rubio: 174 delegates John Kasich: 162 delegates Ben Carson: 9 delegates Jeb Bush: 4 delegates Rand Paul: 1 delegate Mike Huckabee: 1 delegate Carly Fiorina: 1 delegate Uncommitted: 130 delegates

Fifty-six primary contests were conducted to choose 2,472 delegates. In 50 states and territories the delegates were allocated to candidates by popular vote either statewide or on the congressional district level and then elected according to state rules. In six states and territories, the first-instance popular vote did not allocate any delegates; they were elected later at local conventions and either bound to a candidate or uncommitted.

Most delegates were elected as bound delegates, meaning that they were required to vote for a specific candidate on the first ballot at the national convention. Some delegates attended the convention as unbound or uncommitted delegates, meaning that they were free to vote for anyone at the first ballot. These 130 uncommitted delegates included 18 unbound RNC delegates (Note: RNC members from Colorado, Guam, North Dakota, Samoa, Virgin Islands and Wyoming attended the National Convention as unbound) and 112 delegates that have been elected or allocated as uncommitted. (Note: Uncommitted delegates have been allocated or elected in Colorado (4), Guam (6), Louisiana (5), North Dakota (25), Oklahoma (3), Pennsylvania (54), Samoa (6), Virgin Islands (2), Washington (3), West Virginia (3), and Wyoming (1))

Uncommitted delegates were still at liberty to express a preference for a candidate, although that preference was not binding. Among the 901 delegates elected for candidates who later dropped out of the race, 155 were still bound to vote for their candidate on the first ballot (Note: Some delegates were bound to Bush (1), Carson (7), Fiorina (1), Huckabee (1), Paul (1) and Rubio (144)) and 34 were released (Note: In US elections, suspending a campaign is a legal technicality allowing candidates to keep raising funds and paying off their debts.) according to the local rules of each state party.

If no candidate were elected in the first round of voting, a progressively larger number of delegates would have been allowed to vote for the candidate of their choice. The voting rules on subsequent ballots were determined by individual states: most states released their delegates on the second round of voting, and only four states kept them bound on the third round and beyond.

This table shows how many bound delegates each candidate had won before suspending his or her campaign. It does not show how many unbound delegates pledged their support to any candidate during the primaries, nor does it show the expected result of the vote at the national convention. Although a state is considered won by a candidate if a plurality of the state's delegates are bound, RNC Rule 40(b) required a candidate to demonstrate support from a majority of delegates in eight states to be eligible as the nominee.

Convention rules are based on delegate votes, not the popular vote. In the context of Republican primaries, the term "states" refers collectively to the fifty states, the District of Columbia and the five inhabited territories (altogether 56 delegations) as specified in RNC Rule 1(b). In the following table, states and territories where the candidates achieved a majority of bound delegates are marked in bold. States and territories where a candidate won a majority of delegates but not a majority of bound delegates are marked in italics.

=== Nominee ===
Republican nominee for the 2016 presidential election
Candidate	Born	Most recent position	Home state	Campaign Announcement date	Bound delegates (hard count; then floor)	Popular vote	Contests won (Note: In bolded states and territories, the leading candidate won the support of an absolute majority of that state's delegation for the first ballot; according to Rule 40(b), 8 such states are needed to be eligible. In states and territories that are not bolded, the leading candidate won the support of a simple plurality of delegates.)	Running mate	Ref.
**Donald Trump**	June 14, 1946 (age 70); Queens, New York	Chairman of The Trump Organization (1971–2017)	New York	Campaign **June 16, 2015**; FEC filing **Secured nomination:** **May 26, 2016**	**1,441** (58.3%) (floor 1,725)	**14,015,993** (44.95%)	**41**; **AL**, **AR**, AS, **AZ**, **CA**, **CT**, **DE**, **FL**, **GA**, GU, **HI**, **IL**, **IN**, KY, **LA**, **MA**, **MD**, MI, **MO**, **MP**, **MS**, **MT**, NC, ND, **NE**, NH, NV, **NJ**, **NM**, **NY**, **OR**, **PA**, **RI**, **SC**, **SD**, **TN**, VA, **VI**, VT, **WA**, **WV**	Mike Pence	

=== Withdrew during the primaries ===
Major candidates who withdrew during the 2016 Republican Party presidential primaries
Candidate	Born	Most recent position	Home state	Campaign announced	Campaign suspended	Campaign	Bound delegates (hard count; then floor)	Popular vote	Contests won (Note: In bolded states and territories, the leading candidate won the support of an absolute majority of that state's delegation for the first ballot; according to Rule 40(b), 8 such states are needed to be eligible. In states and territories that are not bolded, the leading candidate won the support of a simple plurality of delegates.)	Running mate	Ref.
Ted Cruz	December 22, 1970 (age 45); Calgary, Alberta, Canada	U.S. senator from Texas (2013–present)	Texas	March 23, 2015	May 3, 2016 (endorsed Trump)	__________; Campaign; FEC filing	551 (22.3%) (floor 484)	7,822,100 (25.08%)	**11**; AK, **CO**, IA, **ID**, **KS**, **ME**, OK, **TX**, **UT**, **WI**, **WY**	Carly Fiorina	
Marco Rubio	May 28, 1971 (age 44); Miami, Florida	U.S. senator from Florida (2011–2025)	Florida	April 13, 2015	March 15, 2016 (ran successfully for reelection; endorsed Trump)	__________; Campaign; FEC filing	173 (7%) (floor 123)	3,515,576 (11.27%)	**3**; **DC**, MN, **PR**	None	
John Kasich	May 13, 1952 (age 63); McKees Rocks, Pennsylvania	Governor of Ohio (2011–2019)	Ohio	July 21, 2015	May 4, 2016 (did not endorse any candidate, wrote-in John McCain for general election)	__________; Campaign; FEC filing	161 (6.5%) (floor 125)	4,290,448 (13.76%)	**1**; **OH**	None	
Ben Carson	September 18, 1951 (age 64); Detroit, Michigan	Director of pediatric neurosurgery for Johns Hopkins Children's Center (1984–2013)	Maryland	May 3, 2015	March 4, 2016 (endorsed Trump)	__________; Campaign; FEC filing	9 (0.4%) (floor 7)	857,039 (2.75%)	None	None	
Jeb Bush	February 11, 1953 (age 63); Midland, Texas	Governor of Florida (1999–2007)	Florida	June 15, 2015	February 20, 2016 (endorsed Cruz, then no endorsement)	__________; Campaign; FEC filing	4 (0.2%) (floor 3)	286,694 (0.92%)	None	None	
Rand Paul	January 7, 1963 (age 53); Pittsburgh, Pennsylvania	U.S. senator from Kentucky (2011–present)	Kentucky	April 7, 2015	February 3, 2016 (ran successfully for reelection; endorsed Trump)	__________; Campaign; FEC filing	1 (0%) (floor 2)	66,788 (0.21%)	None	None	
Mike Huckabee	August 24, 1955 (age 60); Hope, Arkansas	Governor of Arkansas (1996–2007)	Arkansas	May 5, 2015	February 1, 2016 (endorsed Trump)	__________; Campaign; FEC filing	1 (0%) (floor 0)	51,450 (0.16%)	None	None	
Carly Fiorina	September 6, 1954 (age 61); Austin, Texas	CEO of Hewlett-Packard (1999–2005)	California	May 4, 2015	February 10, 2016 (endorsed Cruz, later Trump but rescinded endorsement)	__________; Campaign; FEC filing	1 (0%) (floor 0)	40,666 (0.13%)	None	None	
Chris Christie	September 6, 1962 (age 53); Newark, New Jersey	Governor of New Jersey (2010–2018)	New Jersey	June 30, 2015	February 10, 2016 (endorsed Trump)	__________; Campaign; FEC filing	None	57,637 (0.18%)	None	None	
Jim Gilmore	October 6, 1949 (age 66); Richmond, Virginia	Governor of Virginia (1998–2002)	Virginia	July 30, 2015	February 12, 2016 (endorsed Trump)	__________; Campaign; FEC filing	None	18,369 (0.06%)	None	None	
Rick Santorum	May 10, 1958 (age 57); Winchester, Virginia	U.S. senator from Pennsylvania (1995–2007)	Pennsylvania	May 27, 2015	February 3, 2016 (endorsed Rubio, later Trump)	__________; Campaign; FEC filing	None	16,627 (0.05%)	None	None	

=== Withdrew before the primaries ===
Major candidates who withdrew before the 2016 Republican Party presidential primaries
Candidate	Born	Most recent position	Home state	Campaign announced	Campaign suspended	Campaign	Bound delegates (hard count)	Popular vote	Contests won (Note: In bolded states and territories, the leading candidate won the support of an absolute majority of that state's delegation for the first ballot; according to Rule 40(b), 8 such states are needed to be eligible. In states and territories that are not bolded, the leading candidate won the support of a simple plurality of delegates.)	Ref.
George Pataki	June 24, 1945 (age 70); Peekskill, New York	Governor of New York (1995–2006)	New York	May 28, 2015	December 29, 2015 (endorsed Rubio, later Kasich, then no endorsement)	__________; Campaign; FEC filing	None	2,036	None	
Lindsey Graham	July 9, 1955 (age 60); Central, South Carolina	U.S. senator from South Carolina (2003–2026)	South Carolina	June 1, 2015	December 21, 2015 (endorsed Bush, later Cruz, then McMullin)	__________; Campaign; FEC filing	None	5,666	None	
Bobby Jindal	June 10, 1971 (age 44); Baton Rouge, Louisiana	Governor of Louisiana (2008–2016)	Louisiana	June 24, 2015	November 17, 2015 (endorsed Rubio, later Trump)	__________; Campaign; FEC filing	None	222	None	
Scott Walker	November 2, 1967 (age 47); Colorado Springs, Colorado	Governor of Wisconsin (2011–2019)	Wisconsin	July 13, 2015	September 21, 2015 (endorsed Cruz, later Trump)	__________; Campaign; FEC filing	None	1	None	
Rick Perry	March 4, 1950 (age 65); Haskell, Texas	Governor of Texas (2000–2015)	Texas	June 4, 2015	September 11, 2015 (endorsed Cruz, later Trump)	__________; Campaign; FEC filing	None	1	None	

=== Results by county popular vote ===

Donald Trump Ted Cruz John Kasich Marco Rubio Ben Carson
Tie Uncommitted No results (Colorado and North Dakota did not hold primaries/caucuses.)

== Timeline of the race ==
=== Background ===
Former Massachusetts governor Mitt Romney, the 2012 GOP presidential nominee, lost the 2012 election to incumbent Democratic president Barack Obama. The Republican National Committee, believing that the long, drawn-out 2012 primary season had politically and personally damaged Romney, drafted plans to condense the 2016 primary season. As part of these plans, the 2016 Republican National Convention was scheduled for the relatively early date of July 18–21, 2016, the earliest date since Republicans nominated Thomas Dewey in June 1948.

Elements of the Republican establishment, including Senate Minority leader Mitch McConnell, had been grooming then Kansas governor Sam Brownback as the party's favorite mostly due to his aggressive 2012 fiscal overhaul of state finances dubbed the "Kansas experiment." The experiment, engineered primarily by Koch Industries veteran economist Steve Anderson, ultimately caused a financial crisis. The state would see a $687.9 million loss in revenue after predicting its massive tax cuts would grow the economy by $323 million. Brownback would narrowly win in overwhelmingly Republican Kansas during his 2014 re-election bid dashing his national aspirations and further opening the primary.

When John Kasich entered the race on July 21, 2015, the field reached 16 candidates, making it the largest presidential field in the history of the Republican Party, surpassing the 1948 primaries. With Jim Gilmore's announcement to enter the race for a second time on July 30, 2015, the field reached 17 candidates, becoming the largest presidential field in American history, surpassing the 16 candidates in the Democratic Party presidential primaries of 1972 and 1976.

In mid-December 2014, Jeb Bush—widely seen as a possible frontrunner for the nomination due to his relatively moderate stances, record as former governor of a crucial swing state, name recognition and access to high-paying donors—was the first candidate to form a political action committee (PAC) and an exploratory committee. Many other candidates followed suit. The first candidate to declare his candidacy was Texas Senator Ted Cruz, who was popular among grassroots conservatives due to his association with the Tea Party movement, and who also received early backing of several prominent Republican donors including Robert Mercer.

The 2016 candidates were roughly divided into three camps. Grassroots conservatives were represented by Cruz and Carson, the Christian right was represented by Huckabee and Santorum. Moderates, or the establishment, were represented by Bush and Christie. Several—such as Rubio, Walker, and Kasich—were seen as having political backgrounds that may be appealing to both conservatives and moderates. Not all of these candidates clearly toed the grassroots/establishment divide. For instance, Rubio and Cruz were both elected to the Senate in the early 2010s as members of the Tea Party movement, but by 2015 had been courting the support of prominent party elders, political operatives, and large donors with significant success.

Only three of the candidates, Carson, Trump and Fiorina, were true non-establishment candidates in the sense that they had no formal political experience. Fiorina is widely considered to have views in line with the establishment wing led by Bush and Christie. Some called the diversity of candidates representing different wings of the party symptomatic of a struggle for the future direction of the party.

The field was noted for its diversity, and was even called the most diverse presidential field in American history. It included two Latinos (Cruz and Rubio), a woman (Fiorina), an Indian-American (Jindal), and an African-American (Carson). Five were the children of immigrants: Cruz (Cuban father), Jindal (Indian parents), Rubio (Cuban parents), Santorum (Italian father) and Trump (Scottish mother).

=== Overview ===
Widely viewed as a very open contest with no clear front-runner, potential candidates fluctuated in the polls for an extended period from late 2012 to the end of 2015. In the year prior to the election season, a total of 17 major candidates campaigned for the nomination, making it the single largest presidential primary field in American history at the time. By the time the primary season started in early 2016, four candidates had clearly emerged ahead of the rest of the field: Ohio Governor John Kasich, Florida Senator Marco Rubio, Texas Senator Ted Cruz, and New York businessman Donald Trump. Trump maintained wide poll leads throughout 2015 and into 2016, primarily due to his brash and unapologetic style of speaking and campaigning. Trump emphasized a disregard for political correctness, as well as populist and nativist policies. He earned the support of working-class voters and voters without college educations, among other demographics.

Trump's brash attitude and polarizing policy stances generated numerous controversies in the media, and many of the other candidates sought to become the "anti-Trump" candidate by condemning his rhetoric and policies. Senators Cruz and Rubio emphasized their youth in comparison to most other candidates and their possible appeal to Hispanic voters. Ohio governor John Kasich, a moderate Republican, remained in the race for an extended period despite being viewed as having little to no chance of winning the nomination.

Despite Trump's lead in most national polls, the first-in-the-nation Iowa caucuses were won by Cruz due to his support among grassroots conservatives. Trump rebounded with strong wins in New Hampshire, South Carolina, and Nevada. On Super Tuesday, Trump expanded his lead by winning seven of the eleven states, while the Cruz campaign gained new energy with victories in Alaska, Oklahoma, and the significant stronghold of Cruz's home state Texas. Rubio maintained significant momentum with strong finishes in Iowa (third place), South Carolina (second place), and Nevada (second place), before finally claiming victory in Minnesota on Super Tuesday.

Between Super Tuesday and the beginning of the "winner-take-all" primaries, Cruz stayed nearly even with Trump, winning four states to Trump's five. Rubio won several smaller contests such as Puerto Rico and Washington, D.C. In the first round of winner-take-all contests on March 15, Trump greatly expanded his lead by winning five of the six contests. After a significant loss to Trump in his home state of Florida, Rubio suspended his campaign that same day. Meanwhile, Kasich finally gained some momentum by winning his home state of Ohio.

As the primary season entered the spring, the mostly-consolidated field resulted in a closing of the gap between Trump and Cruz, with Trump sweeping the South, the Northeast, and parts of the Midwest while Cruz performed strongly in the West and scored a surprise victory in Maine. Kasich, unable to win any other states besides Ohio, remained far behind in third place. After Cruz's upset win in Wisconsin, speculation began to arise that the convention would be a brokered one in which the establishment would choose Kasich or someone else, since both Trump and Cruz were not viewed favorably by the establishment.

As April came to a close and Trump won a resounding victory in his home state of New York, both Cruz and Kasich were mathematically eliminated from winning the nomination without a brokered convention. Both men then formed an alliance to block Trump from winning the nomination, ahead of the "Acela primaries" of five Northeastern states on April 26. Trump swept all five states and greatly increased his delegate lead. In a final push to block Trump's path to the nomination, Cruz announced that one of the former candidates for the nomination, former Hewlett-Packard CEO Carly Fiorina, would be his running mate if he was the nominee.

After Trump won the Indiana primary on May 3, Cruz suspended his campaign, leading to Republican National Committee chairman Reince Priebus announcing Trump as the presumptive nominee. Kasich announced the suspension of his campaign the next day, leaving Trump as the only candidate left in the race. Trump then won all of the remaining primaries, sweeping the remainder of the West, Midwest and the entirety of the West Coast. With his victories in New Jersey and the remaining final states on June 7, Trump officially surpassed the necessary number of bound delegates, and broke the 2000 record of 12,034,676 popular votes received by the winner of the Republican presidential primaries, with over 14 million votes.

Nominee
Suspended campaigns during primaries
Suspended campaigns before primaries

Iowa caucuses
Super Tuesday
Super Tuesday II
Indiana primary
Primary elections end
Convention 2016

=== 2012–2014: fluctuating polls ===
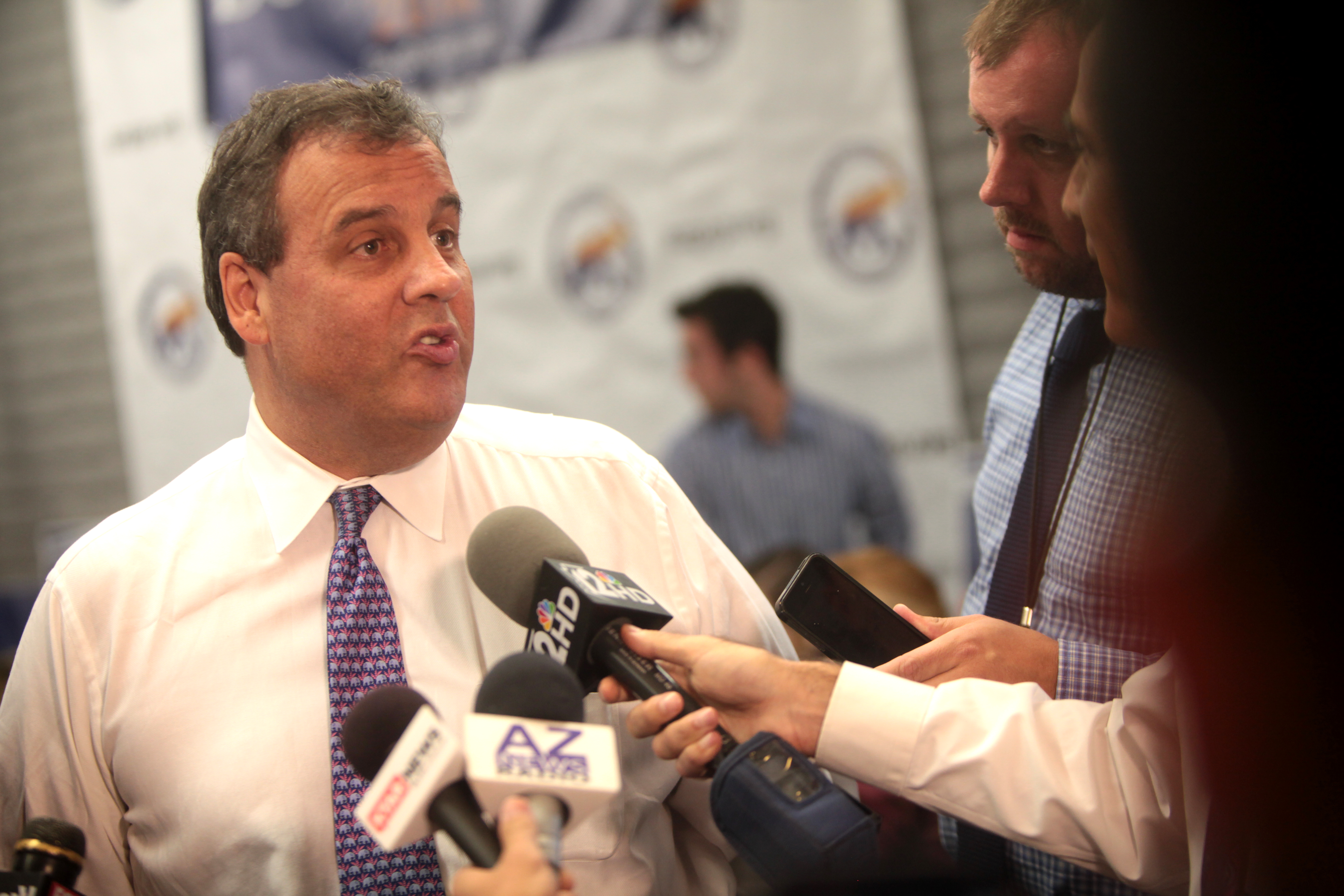
Governor Chris Christie polled highly until the 2014 "Bridgegate" scandal. He suspended his campaign after falling below the threshold in New Hampshire.

After Romney's unsuccessful 2012 campaign, the potential 2016 field was left without a clear future nominee, similar to that of 2008. Speculations began rising from all sides of the right-leaning political spectrum as to who would make the best possible nominee: One faction of candidates included young freshmen senators, some with alliances to the Tea Party movement, such as Cruz, Paul, and Rubio, who in particular was the focus of attention immediately following 2012. In most national polls from late-2012 to mid-2013, Rubio was leading due to being young, articulate, having a broad appeal among conservatives and moderates and also for his Latino heritage and continued efforts on immigration reform, which many viewed as possible tools to draw Hispanic voters to the GOP.

Another narrative for the nomination, similar to that which drove Romney's 2012 campaign, was that the nominee needed to be a governor in a traditionally Democratic or swing state, with a proven record that would stand as proof that such a governor could be president as well. The possible candidates that fit this criterion included Bush, Gilmore, Kasich, Pataki, Walker and Christie, who in particular had been rising in popularity due to his loud and blunt manner of speaking at public events, championed by some as challenging conventional political rhetoric.

With his record as governor of New Jersey, a heavily Democratic state, factored in, Christie overtook Rubio in the polls from mid-2013 up until early 2014, when the "Bridgegate" scandal was first revealed and started to damage Christie's reputation and poll standing. Although he was later cleared of personal responsibility in the subsequent investigation, Christie never regained frontrunner status.

After Christie's fall, the polls fluctuated from January to November 2014. Candidates who often performed well included Rand Paul, who won CPAC straw polls in 2013, 2014 and 2015, Wisconsin congressman and 2012 vice presidential nominee Paul Ryan, the eventual House speaker, and former candidates such as former Arkansas governor Mike Huckabee and then-governor of Texas Rick Perry, further reflecting the uncertainty of the upcoming race for the nomination.

=== April 2014 – January 2015: Jeb Bush leading the polls ===
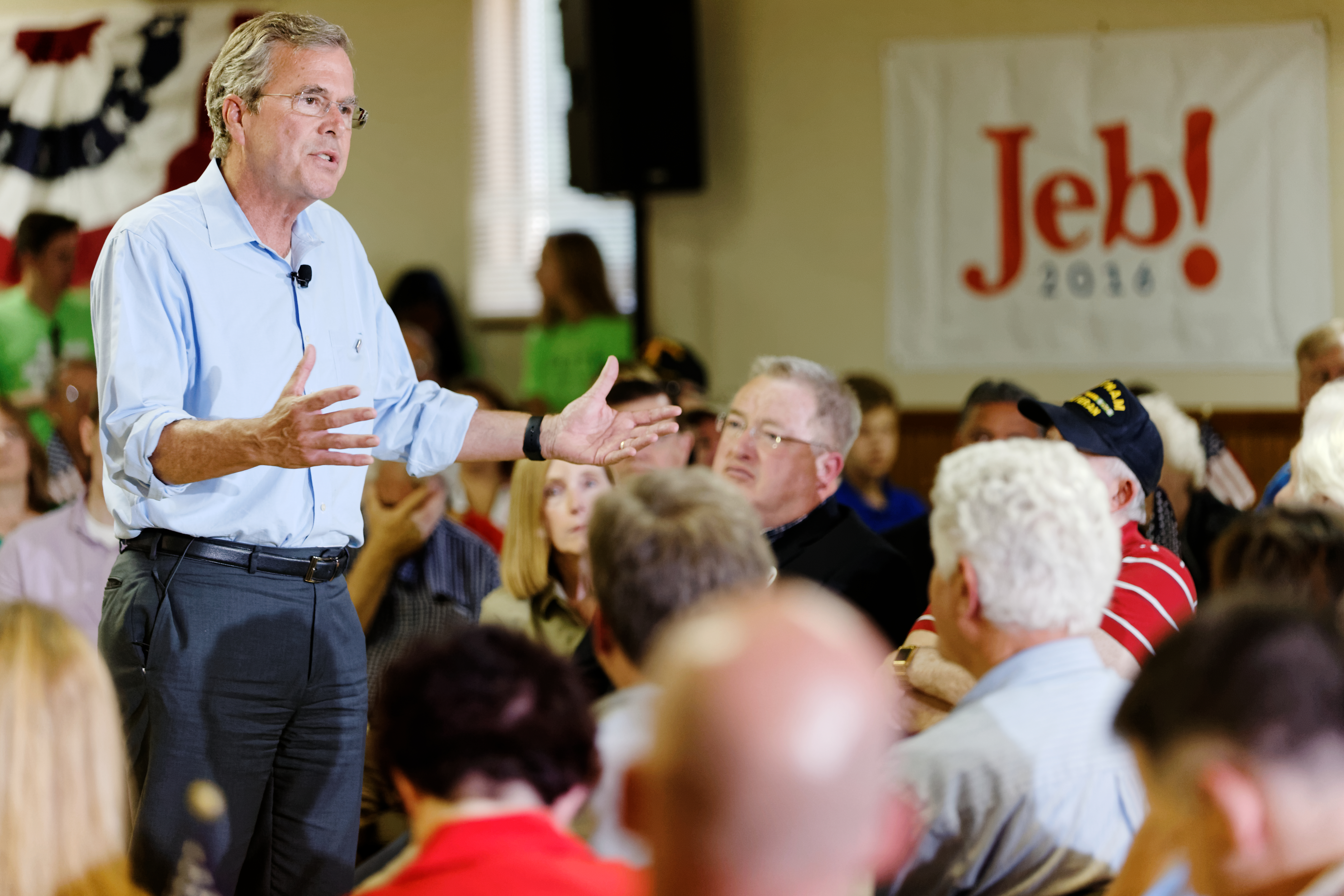
After holding an unsteady lead in most of 2014 and early 2015, former Florida Governor Jeb Bush was unable to garner popular support and suspended his campaign following the South Carolina primary.

In April 2014, Robert Costa and Philip Rucker of The Washington Post reported that the period of networking and relationship-building that they dubbed the "credentials caucus" had begun, with prospective candidates "quietly studying up on issues and cultivating ties to pundits and luminaries from previous administrations".

Though Bush often polled in the low double digits, he was considered a prominent candidate due to his high fundraising ability, record as governor of Florida, a crucial swing state, and apparent electability. By November 2014, Bush had solidified his lead in the polls. Around this time there were talks of the possibility of Romney making a third run for the presidency. From November 2014 until late January 2015, the speculation fueled Romney's rise in many national polls, challenging Bush. Although Romney admitted he was entertaining the idea after initially declining, he ultimately reaffirmed his decision not to run on January 30, 2015.

By the end of February, Wisconsin Governor Scott Walker rose to match Bush in the polls. He often touted his record as governor in a traditionally Democratic state, particularly noting his victory in a recall election in 2012, the first governor in American history to do so, combined with his reelection in 2014. Walker and Bush balanced out in the polls from late February until about mid-June, at which point Trump entered the race. Walker's challenge to Bush allowed other candidates to briefly resurge in some polls from late April up until mid-June, including former top performers Rubio, Paul and Huckabee, in addition to several newcomers to the top tier of polling, including Cruz and Carson.

=== Mid-2015: Donald Trump and the rise of the outsiders ===
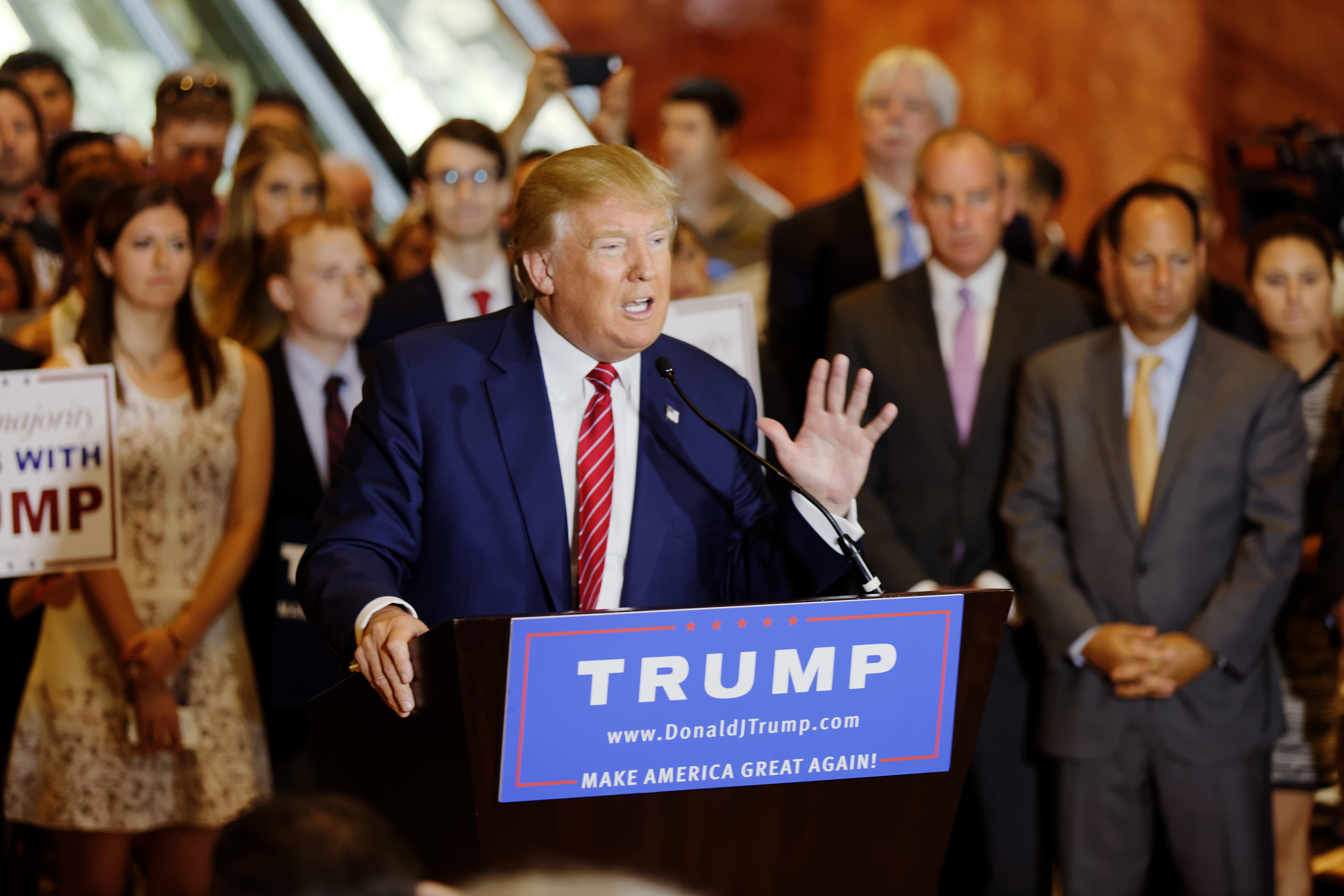
Donald Trump's poll numbers surged as he entered the race and he held a strong lead entering the primary season. After losing Iowa to Cruz, Trump won the next three February primaries.

Shortly after Trump announced his candidacy on June 16, 2015, many pundits noted his uniquely outspoken nature, blunt language and rhetoric, often directly contradicting traditional political candidates. This style was seen as resonating strongly with potential Republican primary voters and Trump began to rise in the polls. After a few weeks of briefly matching Bush, Trump surged into first place in all major national polls by mid-July, which he continued to lead consistently until November. Trump polled well in the early-voting states of Iowa, New Hampshire and South Carolina, often leading or coming in second in those states.

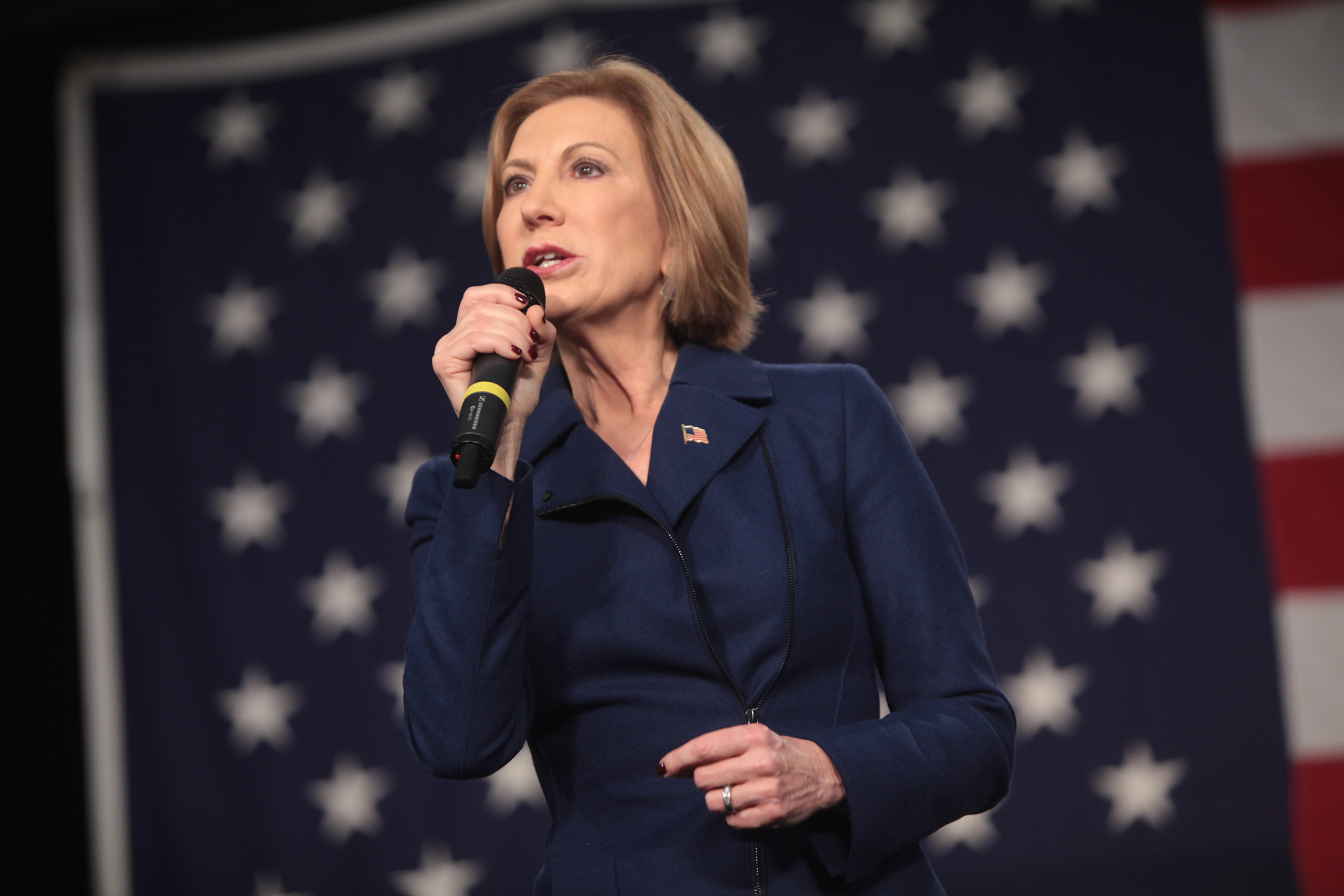
Carly Fiorina rose in the polls after the second debate. She failed to capitalize on her momentum and faded quickly. She suspended her campaign after New Hampshire. She served as Cruz's running mate from April 27 to May 3, until Cruz suspended his campaign.

With the surge of Trump, a man who had never held political office, the general focus began to shift over to other non-politician candidates, commonly known as "outsiders". The other two outsiders in the field quickly rose in the polls as well in the wake of the first two debates: Carson, who rose into second place after a well-received performance in the first debate and Fiorina, who rose into the top three after her performance in the second debate.

The rising popularity of non-politician outsiders shocked many political analysts, and fueled a new conversation about how those with no political experience or prior runs for office could appeal more to potential primary voters than career politicians and what it means for the future of the Republican party and American politics in general. Trump used ideas of populism to persuade the average American throughout the election process.

In mid-September, the first two major candidates dropped out of the race. Perry suspended his campaign on September 11, 2015, citing his failure to qualify for the primetime debates, his subsequent failure to raise a significant amount of money and his indictment as reasons. Ten days later, on September 21, 2015, Walker suspended his campaign mainly due to his own poll numbers dropping after two lackluster debate performances.

=== End of 2015: the field stabilizes, six candidates gain traction ===
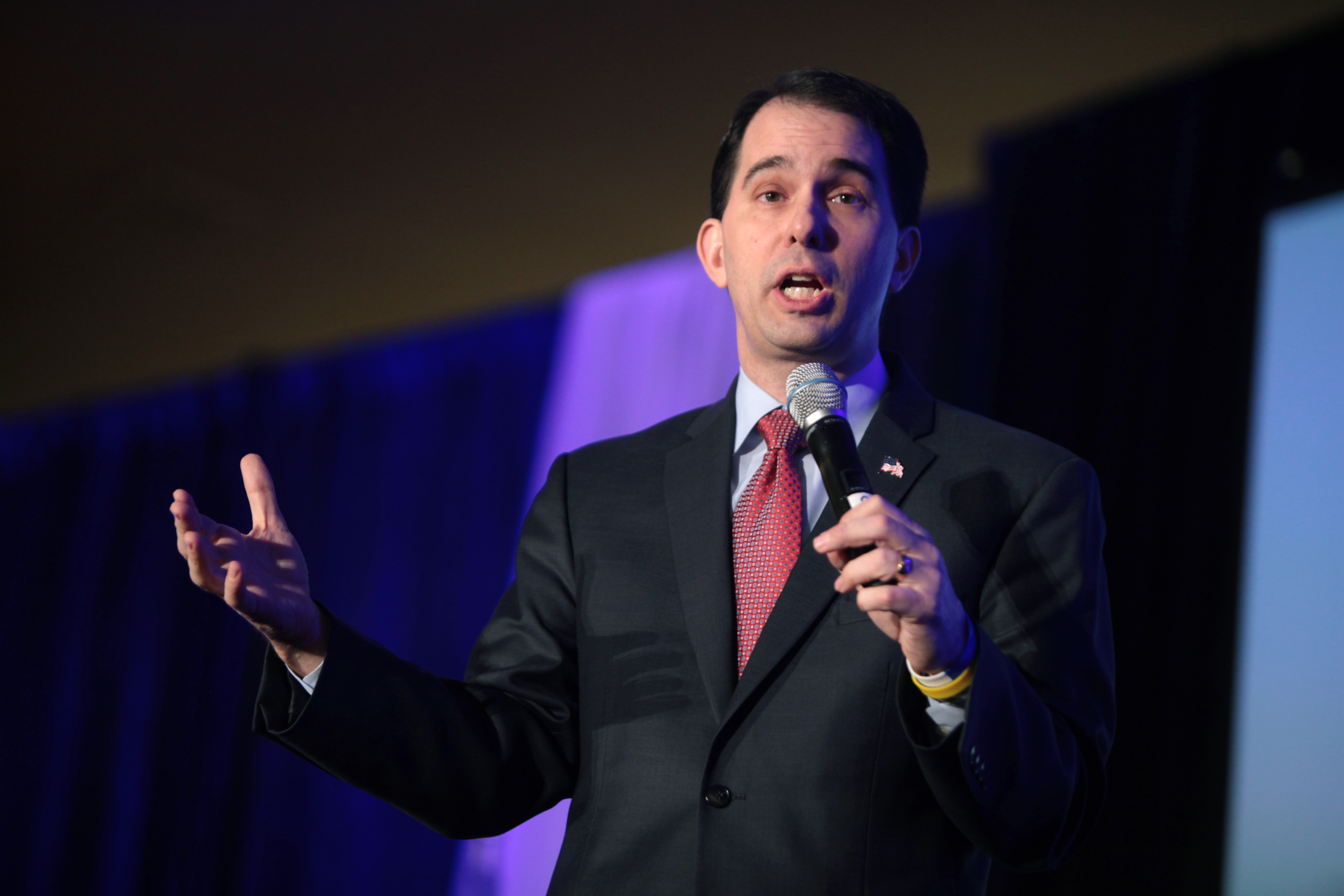
Governor Scott Walker surprised many political observers when he announced the suspension of his campaign on September 21, 2015, in Wisconsin.

By the end of September, most polling averages indicated that the field was stabilizing in terms of public opinion. Six candidates in particular were gaining traction and pulling away from the rest of the field by considerable margins. Polling averages indicated the top six as Trump, Carson, Rubio, Fiorina, Bush and Cruz. Trump and Carson were consistently first and second, respectively. Fiorina was initially in third place before being surpassed by Rubio. Bush and Cruz remained in fifth and sixth place, respectively.

The other candidates who had been in the top ten of polling—Christie, Huckabee, Paul and Kasich—all leveled out at roughly 3% or less, while the five remaining candidates outside the top ten—Santorum, Jindal, Pataki, Graham and Gilmore—were consistently polling below 1%. By the third debate in late October, Bush and Fiorina's numbers were beginning to fade, while Cruz was on the rise and began coming in fourth by most poll averages. The third debate only solidified these numbers: Bush and Fiorina remained in low digits as both were considered lackluster, while Cruz was widely held as the winner and rose even further.

Throughout this period, both Trump and Carson had pulled well ahead of the rest of the field and with Trump often registering in the low 30s and high 20s and Carson in the low 20s, the two of them combined often made up well over 50% of the electorate in a vast majority of national polls. Later in October and in early November, Carson began to match even with Trump by most polling averages, rising into the mid 20s and often finishing either just behind or just ahead of Trump.

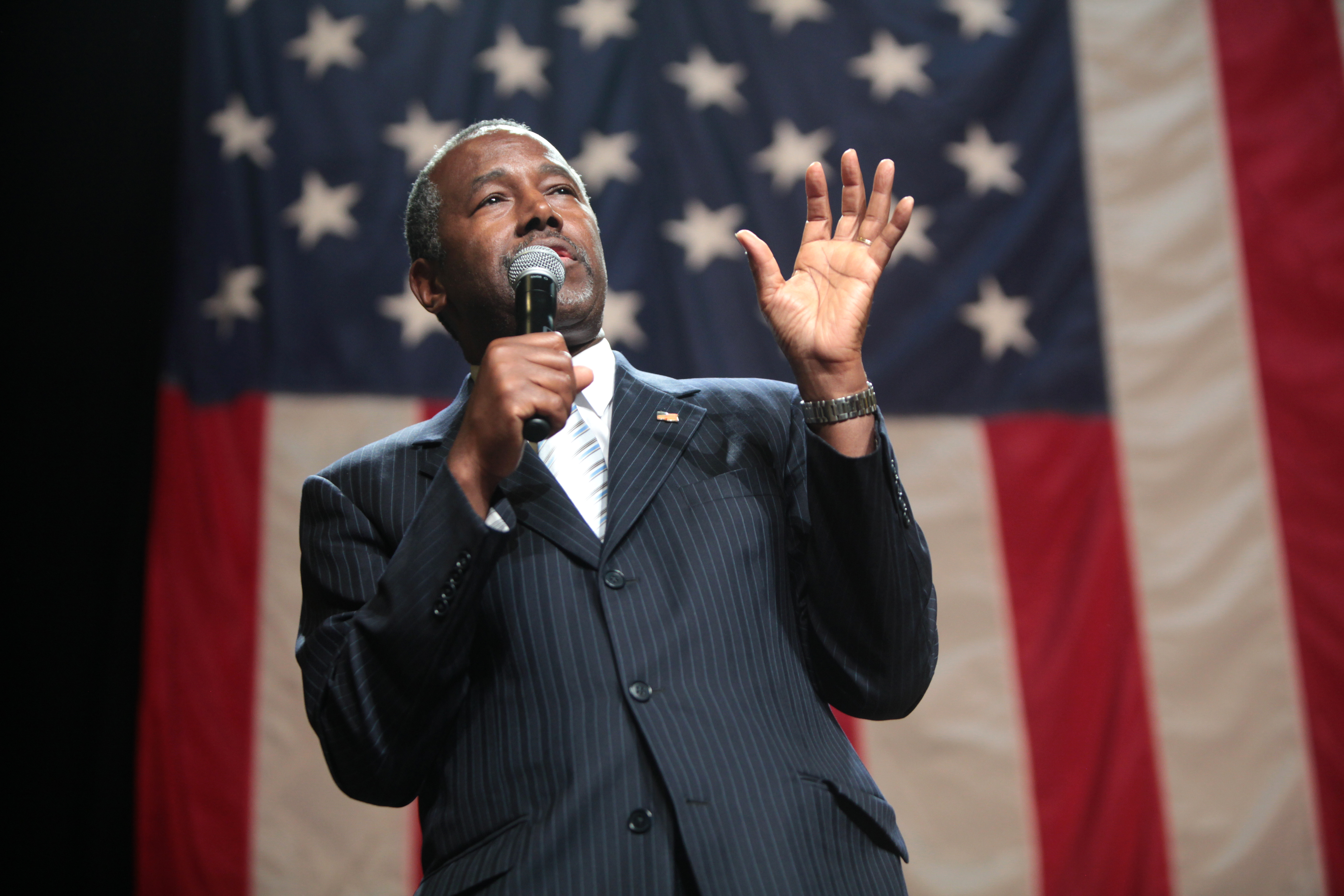
An autumn surge had former neurosurgeon Ben Carson polling even with Trump at one point, but his support decreased significantly following the terrorist attacks in Paris, which highlighted Carson's perceived inexperience on foreign policy. He suspended his campaign after four last-place finishes on Super Tuesday and endorsed Trump in response to Fiorina endorsing Cruz.

By October, with the polls reflecting a field that seemed to be stabilizing, most commentators began to claim that the field had already established who the final four candidates—those who were in the race for the long-term and had the best chance of actually becoming the nominee—would be. The four were listed as being Trump, Carson, Rubio, and Cruz: Trump and Carson for their appeal as outsiders, as well as their opposite personalities—with Trump's blunt nature and tough foreign policy stances, against Carson's soft-spoken nature and personal favorability—Rubio for his appeal to Hispanics and his stance on such issues as immigration reform, combined with strong debate performances and significant donor backing and Cruz for his appeal to Tea Party and Christian conservative voters, which was seen as possibly having a strong impact in the southern states.

On November 17, 2015, Jindal became the third major Republican candidate to drop out. The November 2015 Paris attacks, which killed 130 people days before Jindal dropped out, were widely seen as having a significant impact on the 2016 presidential race, particularly on the Republican side. The attacks were seen as boosting the campaigns of those with tough stances on immigration like Trump and Cruz, as well as the foreign policy hawks like Rubio. Possibly as a result, Carson—who had previously been perceived as uninformed and relatively inarticulate on foreign policy—began to suffer in the polls, with Trump once again solidifying a double-digit lead over everyone else, while Rubio and Cruz began to steadily rise as Carson's numbers declined.

By December, Cruz had overtaken Carson by solidifying a base of support among Christian conservatives and averaged national polling of 18%, second only to Trump. The non-interventionist Paul still failed to make traction at this juncture, while Carson fell down to about 10%, roughly even with Rubio. On December 15, 2015, there was another presidential debate, which saw no major changes in the perceptions of the candidates. On December 21, 2015, the same day as the deadline to withdraw from the ballot in his home state of South Carolina, Graham suspended his campaign. Eight days later, on December 29, Pataki, who was struggling to poll above the margin of error, suspended his campaign as well.

=== January 2016: the road to the early primaries ===
2016 dawned with the several-month-long truce between Trump and Cruz being broken. Cruz accused Trump of not being a consistent conservative or an ethical businessman, while Trump questioned the Canadian-born Cruz's constitutional eligibility to be president—candidates have to be natural-born U.S. citizens to be eligible to be president—while noting Cruz's past calls for immigration reform. This occurred as Trump and Cruz were vying for supremacy at the top of Iowa polls, in addition to both being the top two candidates in all national polls, ahead of the rest of the field by significant margins.

In the closing weeks before Iowa, Trump and Cruz ran dueling television commercials, each attacking the other's record. Meanwhile, there was conflict between "establishment" candidates Rubio, Christie, Bush and Kasich, largely due to a media-reinforced belief that only a single establishment candidate could remain in the race past the early primaries. The establishment candidates staked their bids on strong showings in New Hampshire and both Christie and Kasich saw upticks in their polling in the weeks before the primary.

Both the Trump-Cruz conflict and the squabbling between establishment candidates was evident at the Republican debate on January 14. The Republican debate of January 28, devoid of Trump due to priorities and conflicts with moderator Megyn Kelly after the debate in August, was the candidates' last shot at honing their message before the Iowa caucuses. Immigration and foreign policy featured prominently in this debate and many candidates used the opportunity of a "Trump-less debate" to criticize the second-place Cruz, who was also being heavily criticized by prominent Republican leaders in the weeks before Iowa.

=== February 2016: early primaries ===
Early states results
Candidate		Trump	Cruz	Rubio	Kasich	Carson	Bush	Gilmore	Christie	Fiorina	Paul	Huckabee	Santorum	Total
Delegates won		Delegates:82 Pledged:82 Unpledged:0	Delegates:17 Pledged:17 Unpledged:0	Delegates:16 Pledged:16 Unpledged:0	Delegates:6 Pledged:6 Unpledged:0	Delegates:5 Pledged:5 Unpledged:0	Delegates:4 Pledged:4 Unpledged:0	Delegates:0 Pledged:0 Unpledged:0	Delegates:0 Pledged:0 Unpledged:0	Delegates:1 Pledged:1 Unpledged:0	Delegates:1 Pledged:1 Unpledged:0	Delegates:1 Pledged:1 Unpledged:0	Delegates:0 Pledged:0 Unpledged:0	133 Pledged:133 Unpledged:0
Popular vote		421,577 (32.7%)	266,406 (20.7%)	257,804 (20.0%)	107,525 (8.4%)	81,091 (6.3%)	94,699 (7.3%)	146 (0.01%)	24,423 (1.9%)	15,281 (1.2%)	10,581 (0.8%)	3,582 (0.3%)	1,950 (0.2%)	1,289,211
States won		3	1	0	0	0	0	0	0	0	0	0	0	4
Feb 1	Iowa	24.3% Delegates won:7	27.6% Delegates won:8	23.1% Delegates won:7	1.9% Delegates won:1	9.3% Delegates won:3	2.8% Delegates won:1	0.01% Delegates won:0	1.8% Delegates won:0	1.9% Delegates won:1	4.5% Delegates won:1	1.8% Delegates won:1	1% Delegates won: 0	—N/a
Feb 9	New Hampshire Proportional primary	35.2% Delegates won:11	11.6% Delegates won:3	10.5% Delegates won:2	15.7% Delegates won:4	2.3% Delegates won:0	11% Delegates won:3	0.05% Delegates won:0	7.4% Delegates won:0	4.1% Delegates won:0	0.7% Delegates won:0	—N/a		—N/a
Feb 20	South Carolina Winner-take-most primary; 29 delegates for state winner, 3 per winner of each Congressional District	32.5% Delegates won:50	22.3% Delegates won:0	22.5% Delegates won:0	7.6% Delegates won:0	7.2% Delegates won:0	7.8% Delegates won:0	—N/a						—N/a
Feb 23	Nevada Proportional caucus	45.7% Delegates won:14	21.3% Delegates won:6	23.8% Delegates won:7	3.6% Delegates won:1	4.8% Delegates won:2	—N/a							—N/a

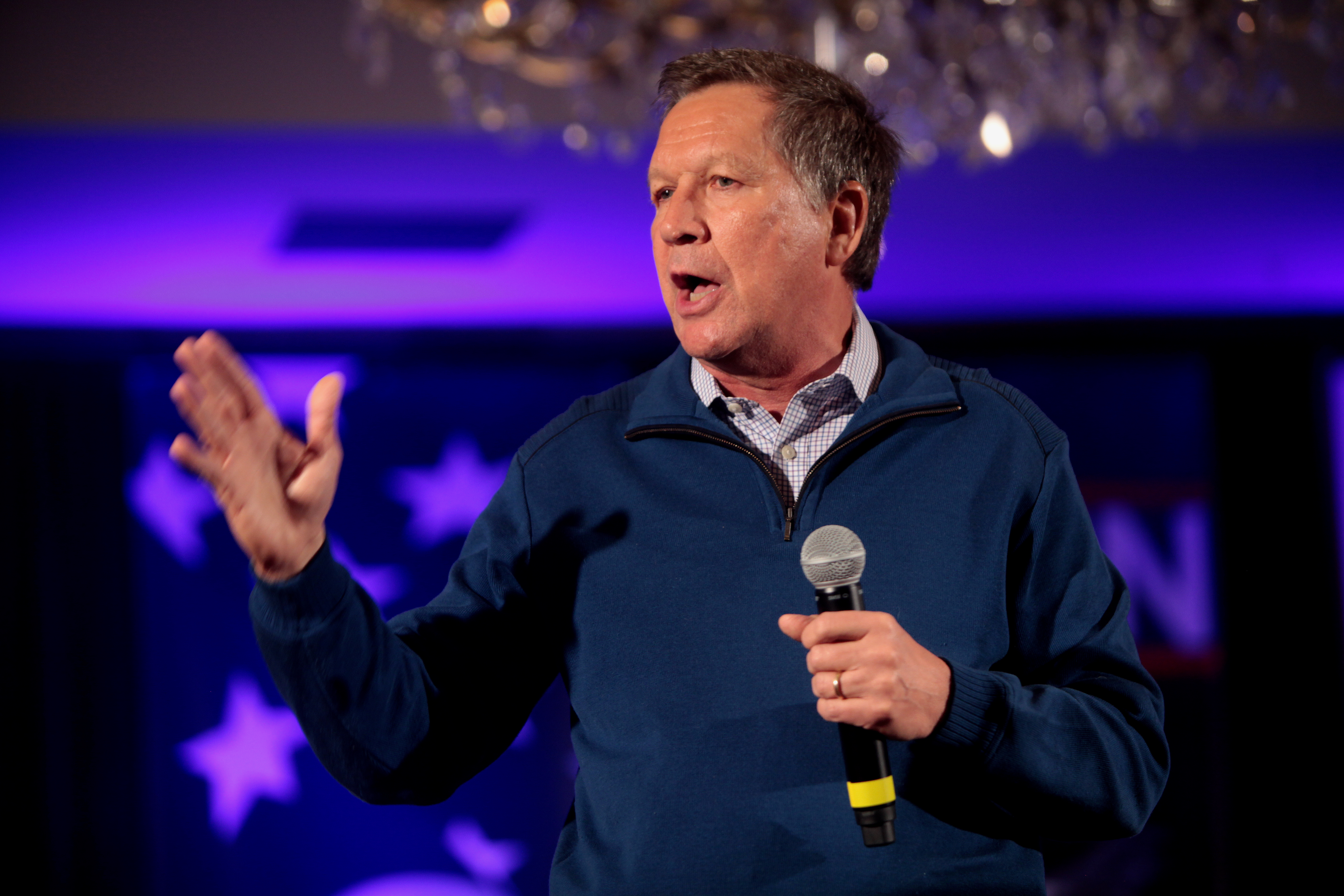
Ohio Governor John Kasich, shown here in Nashua, New Hampshire, finished second in New Hampshire after holding over 100 town hall meetings. He won his first and only state on March 15 in Ohio. He suspended his campaign on May 4.

In the first-in-the-nation Iowa caucuses, Cruz won a narrow victory over Trump and Rubio. Following poor performances in Iowa, three candidates suspended their campaigns: Huckabee—the winner of the caucuses in 2008—Santorum—the winner of the caucuses in 2012—and Paul, whose father performed very well in the 2008 and 2012 caucuses. This caused the field to narrow to nine.

After coming third in the Iowa caucuses, the media quickly painted Rubio as the candidate most likely to pick up the establishment mantle and ride it to the nomination following a strong performance in New Hampshire, much as McCain and Romney had done in 2008 and 2012, respectively. Rubio used this narrative to pick up a number of endorsements in the days following the Iowa caucuses. However, in the New Hampshire debate of February 6, 2016, Rubio repeated a talking point four times almost verbatim during an exchange with Christie, which led to sharp criticism of his performance in the aftermath and the beginning of the end of Rubio's campaign.

In the New Hampshire primary, Trump scored a decisive victory over the rest of the field, winning the primary with 35% of the vote. Kasich, who had held over 100 town halls in the state, finished second in a surprise to many in the media. Cruz coming in third was a shock to many, while Rubio slipped to fifth, behind Trump, Kasich, Cruz and Bush, whose campaign appeared to be revitalized following several months of apparent stagnation. After coming in seventh place in both Iowa and New Hampshire, Fiorina suspended her campaign on February 10, 2016. Later that same day, Christie, whose campaign was staked almost entirely on getting a strong showing in New Hampshire, suspended his campaign after coming in sixth in New Hampshire, failing to reach the minimum 10% vote threshold required to be allocated delegates from the state and qualifying for the next debate on CBS. Later that week, Jim Gilmore, who had failed to gain traction, win delegates or be invited to most of the debates, suspended his campaign, narrowing the field to six.

The third contest was in South Carolina. Prior to the primary, Rubio picked up the key endorsement of Governor Nikki Haley, a feat seen as renewing his momentum after a disappointing finish in New Hampshire. Exit polling showed that 46% of voters had decided the week before the primary, and that the majority of these votes went to Rubio. When the votes were counted, Trump again won by double digits, garnering 33% of the vote, ahead of Rubio with 22%, who edged out Cruz for second-place by 0.2%. Since Trump carried the vote both statewide and in each congressional district, his result netted him all 50 delegates available in the state. Following disappointing finishes in the first three contests despite outspending his competitors, Bush suspended his campaign on February 20.

Three days following the South Carolina primary, Trump won the Nevada caucuses, winning with 46% of the vote with Rubio in a distant second with 24% and Cruz slightly further behind with 21%.

=== March 1, 2016: Super Tuesday ===
Super Tuesday voting, after the early voting in February, decided nearly half of the delegate votes needed to achieve the 1,237 votes to win the nomination at the 2016 Republican National Convention—595 delegates at stake, to be exact. Super Tuesday holds the primary voting for 11 states in the primary election process. North Dakota held the last caucus on Super Tuesday, but there was no presidential straw poll and all the delegates elected later at its convention in April were unbound. Wyoming took a straw poll, but it was non-binding and no delegates were allocated on Super Tuesday. Leading up to Super Tuesday, a debate between the remaining five candidates took place in Houston on February 25, 2016. Political rhetoric and charges heated up with Cruz and Rubio teaming up to attack Trump.

States holding primaries or caucuses on Super Tuesday, 2016: Primary or caucus; delegates bound and allocated Non-binding poll or caucus; delegates allocated later Primary or caucus already held

Super Tuesday results
Candidate	Trump	Cruz	Rubio	Kasich	Carson	Uncom.	Total
Delegates won	255	218	96	21	3	2	595
Popular vote	2,955,120 (34.4%)	2,502,557 (29.2%)	1,881,068 (21.9%)	546,465 (6.4%)	493,912 (5.8%)	–	8,581,841
States won	7	3	1	0	0	0	11
Alabama	43.4% Delegates won:36	21% Delegates won:13	18.7% Delegates won:1	4.4% Delegates won:0	10.2% Delegates won:0	–	—N/a
Alaska	33.6% Delegates won:11	36.4% Delegates won:12	15.2% Delegates won:5	4% Delegates won:0	10.8% Delegates won:0	–	—N/a
Arkansas	32.8% Delegates won:16	31%	25%	4%	6%	–	—N/a
Georgia	39%	24%	24%	6%	6%	–	—N/a
Massachusetts	49%	10%	18%	18%	3%	–	—N/a
Minnesota	21%	29%	36%	6%	7%	–	—N/a
Oklahoma	28%	34%	26%	4%	6%	–	—N/a
Tennessee	39%	25%	21%	5%	8%	–	—N/a
Texas	27%	44%	18%	4%	4%	–	—N/a
Vermont	33%	10%	19%	30%	4%	–	—N/a
Virginia	35%	17%	32%	10%	6%	–	—N/a

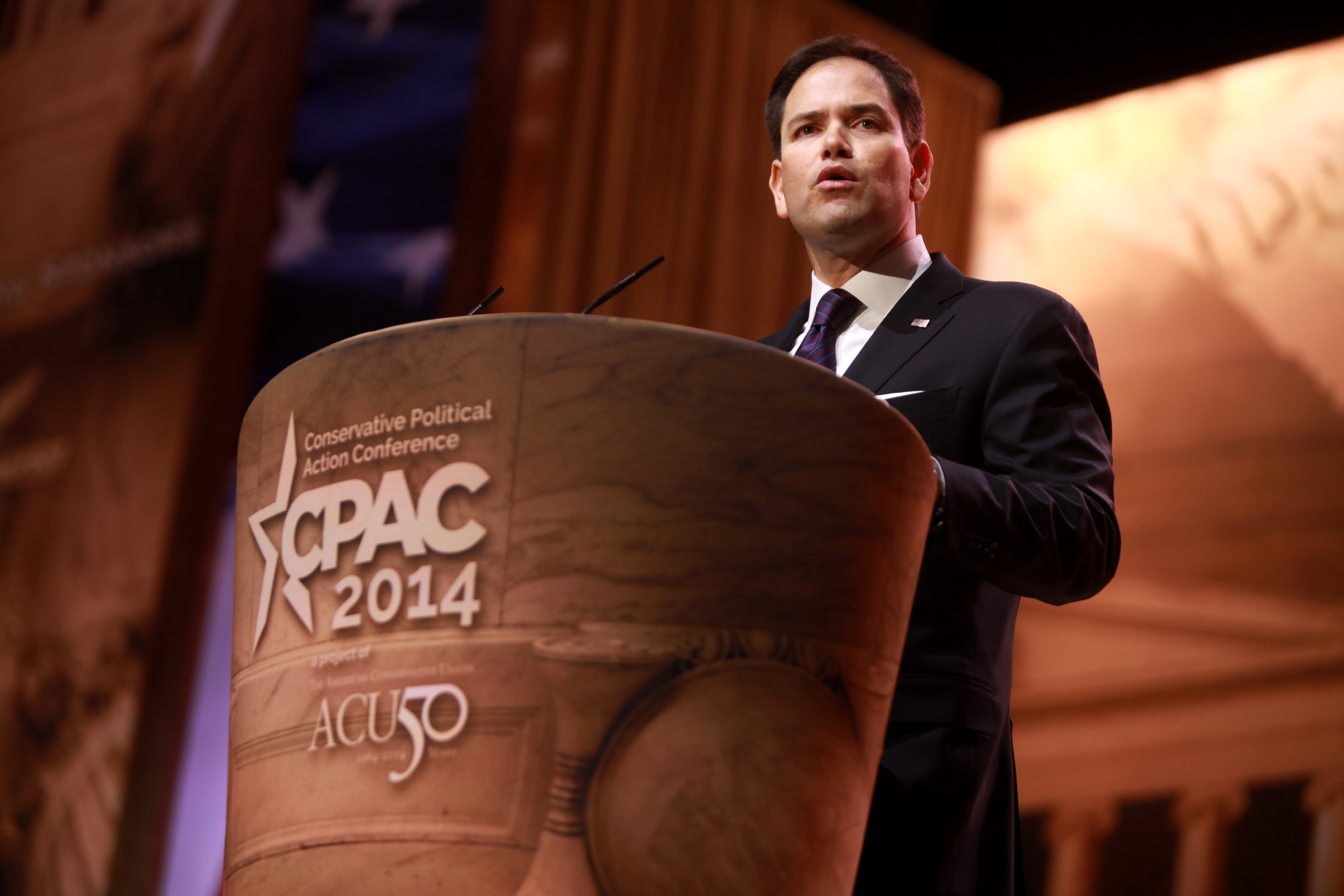
Marco Rubio was considered a leading candidate for both establishment and tea party constituencies, polling in the top three in late 2015 and early 2016. He won his first state on Super Tuesday, capturing Minnesota. After a loss in his home state of Florida, he suspended his campaign on March 15, 2016.

Trump won the contests in Alabama, Arkansas, Georgia, Massachusetts, Tennessee, Vermont, and Virginia, while Cruz netted a strong victory in his home state of Texas and added victories in Oklahoma and Alaska. Rubio won his first contest in the Minnesota Republican Caucus and finished a strong second in Virginia. Kasich won no contests, but he almost won in Vermont and finished second in Massachusetts. Carson did not win or place in any contest, netted only three delegates and though he initially expressed an intent to stay in the race, began showing signs of withdrawing in the days following Super Tuesday; he ultimately suspended his campaign on March 4, 2016.

=== Early March 2016: between Super Tuesdays ===
After Super Tuesday voting, but before winner-take-all voting was to begin, nine states, two territories and Washington, D.C. held their primaries and caucuses. During this period, 377 delegates were at stake. On March 3, 2016, the day before Carson dropped out of the race, Romney criticized Trump in a heavily publicized speech. Later that day, there was another GOP debate, which again featured Trump, Cruz, Rubio and Kasich.

Carson did not participate in the debate. He announced the suspension of his campaign the next day, narrowing the field to four. He endorsed Trump on March 10, 2016, the day after Fiorina endorsed Cruz. Meanwhile, as the prospect of a Trump nomination became more imminent, establishment Republicans pressured Romney or House Speaker Paul Ryan to enter the race. Romney decided not to enter the race on January 30, 2015. Ryan announced he would not enter on April 13, 2016.

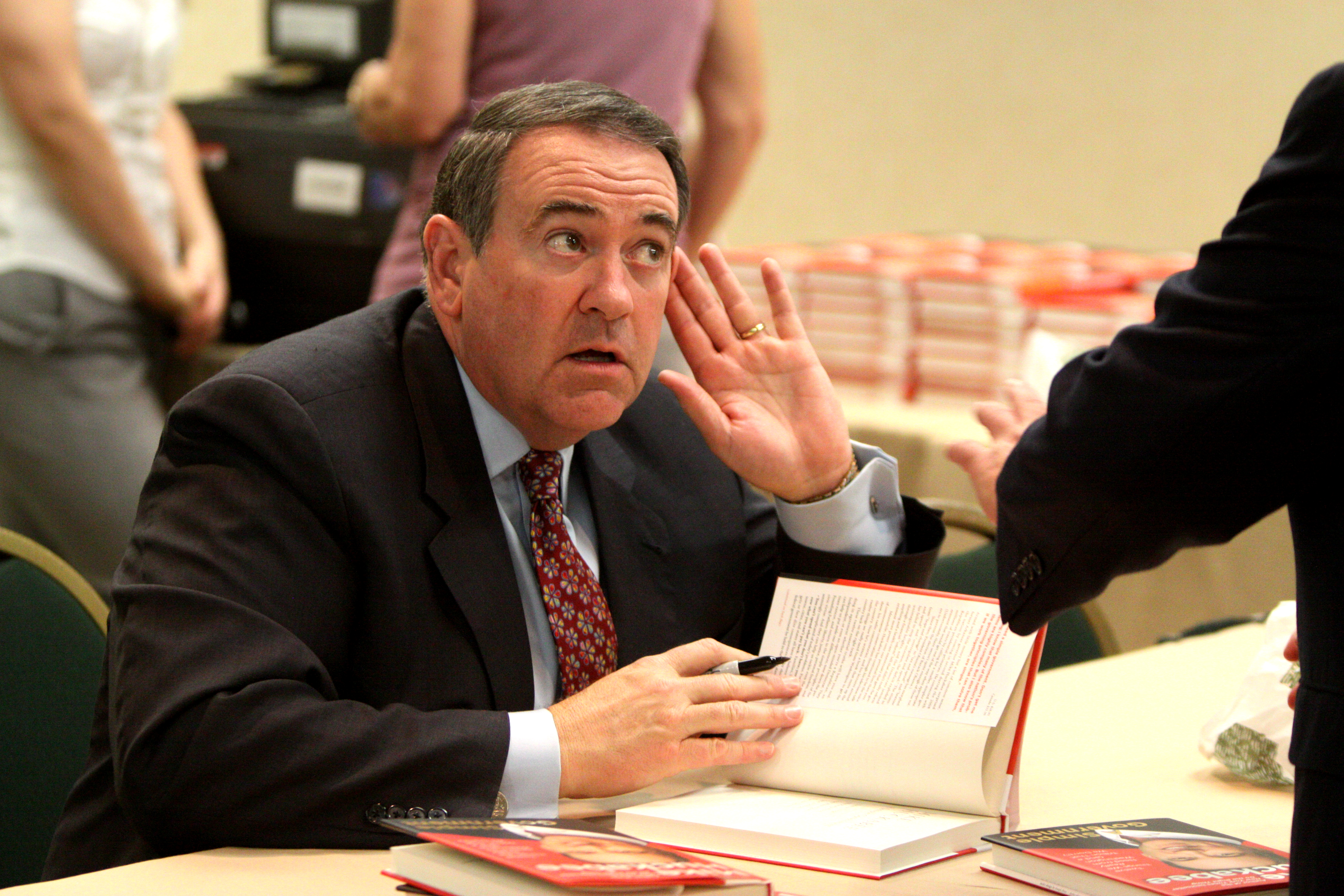
Mike Huckabee at a book signing

On March 5, Cruz won the Kansas and Maine caucuses by comfortable margins. Trump narrowly won the Kentucky caucus and the Louisiana primary. Rubio and Kasich did not finish first or second on any primaries on "Super Saturday". The following day, the first of the 2016 primaries in a U.S. territory went to Rubio, who won all of Puerto Rico's 23 delegates. On March 8, Trump won in Michigan, Mississippi and Hawaii, while Cruz took the Idaho Republican Primary, and Rubio missed delegate thresholds in Michigan, Mississippi and Idaho, finishing the night with only a single delegate. Despite some favorable polling in Michigan, Kasich did not win any primaries, but he still picked up 17 delegates. Neither Rubio nor Kasich finished first or second in any primaries held that day.

In the Virgin Islands caucuses on March 10, a slate composed wholly of uncommitted delegates was initially elected. The entire slate was later disqualified by the territorial party and was replaced by the elected alternates – two uncommitted, two for Rubio and one each for Cruz and Trump. The dispute later went to court. Also on March 10, there was a debate in Florida between the four surviving candidates, which was conducted in a more civil tone than prior debates.

On March 12, the Guam caucuses endorsed eight uncommitted delegates and one unbound Cruz-supporting delegate. Rubio won his final contest in D.C. and 9 delegates went to Cruz in the Wyoming county conventions. Rubio and Trump both earned one delegate and another was elected as uncommitted.

March 5–12 results
Candidate	Trump	Cruz	Rubio	Kasich	Uncom.	Total
Delegates won	140	137	48	36	12 (Note: 3 uncommitted delegates were allocated from Louisiana, 5 from the Virgin Islands, 8 from Guam, 1 from Wyoming)	373
Popular vote	987,571 (37.2%)	820,746 (30.9%)	299,397 (11.3%)	441,127 (16.6%)	24,662 (0.9%)	2,653,336
States won	5	3	0+PR+DC	0	0+VI+GU	8+4
Kansas	23%	47%	17%	11%	0.4%	—N/a
Kentucky	36%	32%	16%	14%	0.2%	—N/a
Louisiana	41%	38%	11%	6%	–	—N/a
Maine	33%	46%	8%	12%	–	—N/a
Puerto Rico	13%	9%	71%	1%	–	—N/a
Hawaii	43%	32%	13%	10%	–	—N/a
Idaho	28%	45%	16%	7%	–	—N/a
Michigan	37%	25%	9%	24%	2%	—N/a
Mississippi	47%	36%	5%	9%	–	—N/a
Virgin Islands^{*}	6%	12%	10%	–	65%	—N/a
Guam^{†}	0	1	0	0	8	—N/a
Washington D.C.	14%	12%	37%	36%	–	—N/a
Wyoming^{‡}	7.2% Delegates won:1	66.3% Delegates won:23	19.5% Delegates won:1	0% Delegates won:0	7.0% Delegates won:1	—N/a

^{*} Virgin Islands results do not take account of the later disqualification of delegates. Accounting for the disqualified delegates, the results were as follows: Uncommitted 36%, Cruz 22%, Rubio 18%, Carson 12%, Trump 12%.
^{†} Delegate totals are given in Guam as no tally of the popular vote has been released and one delegate was elected by acclamation.
^{‡}Wyoming held county conventions with no statewide popular vote; percentages represent the vote of county delegates.

=== March 15, 2016: Super Tuesday II ===
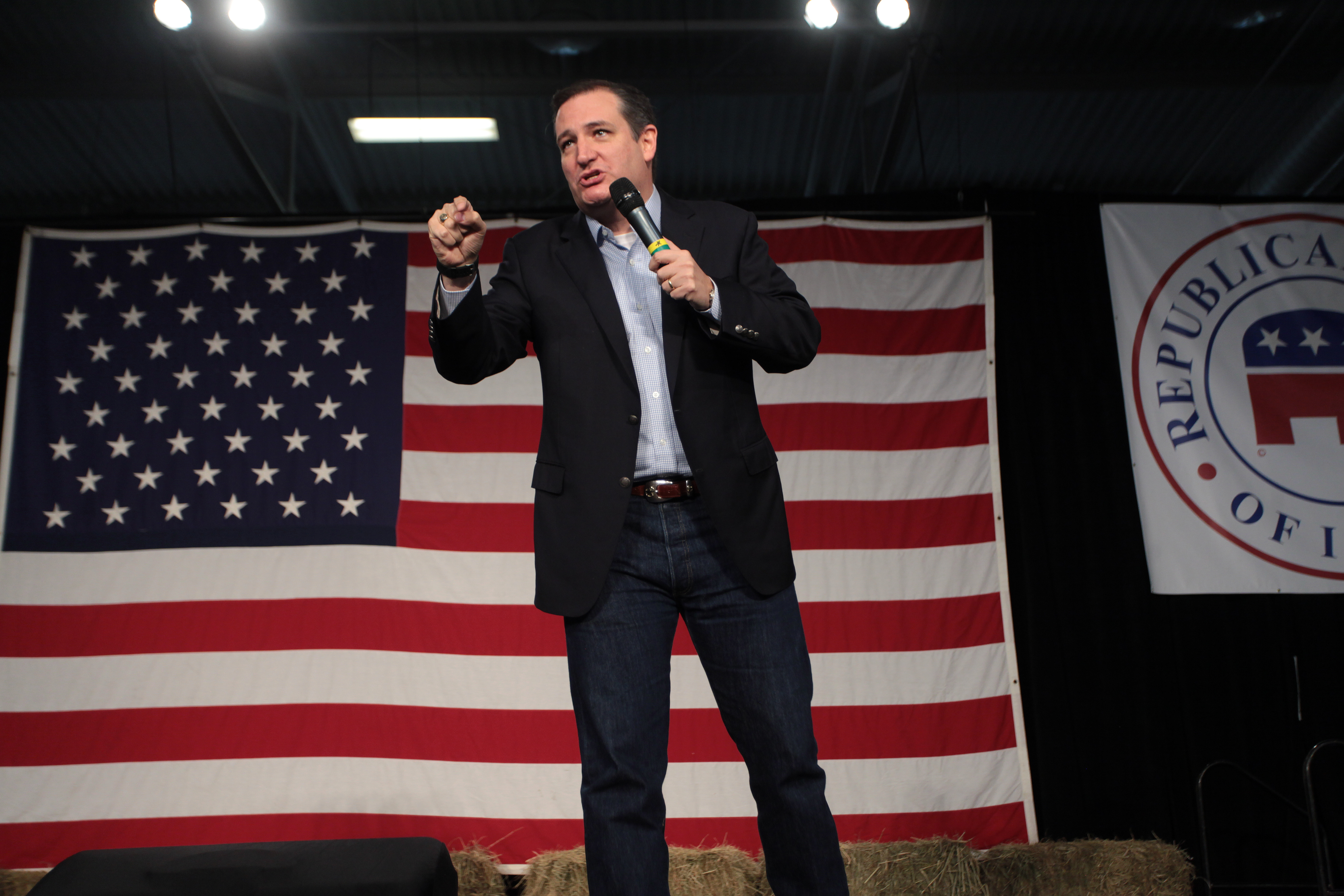
Senator Ted Cruz saw a steady rise in the polls following the CNBC debate in late October. He began the election cycle with a win in Iowa and dropped out after being defeated by Trump in Indiana.

March 15 featured winner-take-all primaries in the delegate-rich states of Florida—Rubio's home state—and Ohio—Kasich's home state. There were also contests in Illinois, Missouri, North Carolina, and the Northern Mariana Islands, totaling 367 delegates. It was widely seen as a very important day in the presidential race because of the large number of winner-take-all delegates at stake. In the days leading up to Florida, the remaining candidates announced prominent endorsements and Trump and Rubio in particular spent millions on television advertisements assailing the other in Florida. The level of protest and violence at Trump rallies meanwhile became an object of criticism by other candidates; one such incident led to the cancellation of a Trump event in Chicago on March 13, 2016.

On March 11, 2016, in an effort to stop Trump, Rubio told his supporters in Ohio to vote for Kasich, while Kasich refused to tell his Florida supporters to help Rubio, with a campaign spokesperson later quoted as saying: "We were going to win Ohio anyway even without his help, just as he's going to lose Florida to Trump without ours." The Northern Mariana Islands caucuses were the first contest to close on March 15, with Trump taking 73% of the vote and collecting all nine delegates.

In Florida, Trump netted the biggest prize of the night, handily defeating Rubio in Rubio's home state. Trump added to that wins in North Carolina, Illinois and Missouri. Soon after the announcement of his loss in Florida, Rubio suspended his campaign. Kasich got on the board for the first time, winning his home state of Ohio to stave off elimination. Kasich's victory in Ohio meant that the 2016 Republican primaries were the first since 1968, and the first in which every state held a contest, in which more than three candidates won at least one state.

In 2012, three candidates, Mitt Romney, Rick Santorum, and Newt Gingrich, won states and a fourth, Ron Paul, won a territory, the Virgin Islands. Democratic primaries have historically been more divided. Examples are the Democratic primaries in 1968 (five candidates won states), 1972 (seven), 1976 (six), 1988 (five), 1992 (five), and 2004 (four). The election in Missouri was very close, with Trump beating Cruz by fewer than 2,000 votes (0.21%), a very similar out come to the concurrent Missouri Democratic presidential primary. Cruz could have contested the outcome because the difference was less than 0.5%, but chose not to, thereby giving the 12 statewide delegates to Trump and 37 overall out of the 52.

March 15 results
Candidate	Trump	Kasich	Cruz	Rubio	Total
Delegates won	228	81	51	6	366
Popular vote	3,202,125 (40.6%)	1,620,506 (20.5%)	1,912,166 (24.2%)	957,976 (12.1%)	7,889,784
States won	4+NMP	1	0	0	5+NMP
Florida	46%	7%	17%	27%	—N/a
Illinois	39%	20%	30%	9%	—N/a
Missouri	40.8%	10%	40.6%	6%	—N/a
North Carolina	40%	12%	36%	8%	—N/a
N. Mariana Islands	73%	2%	24%	1%	—N/a
Ohio	36%	47%	13%	2%	—N/a

=== Late March – April 2016: a three-candidate race ===
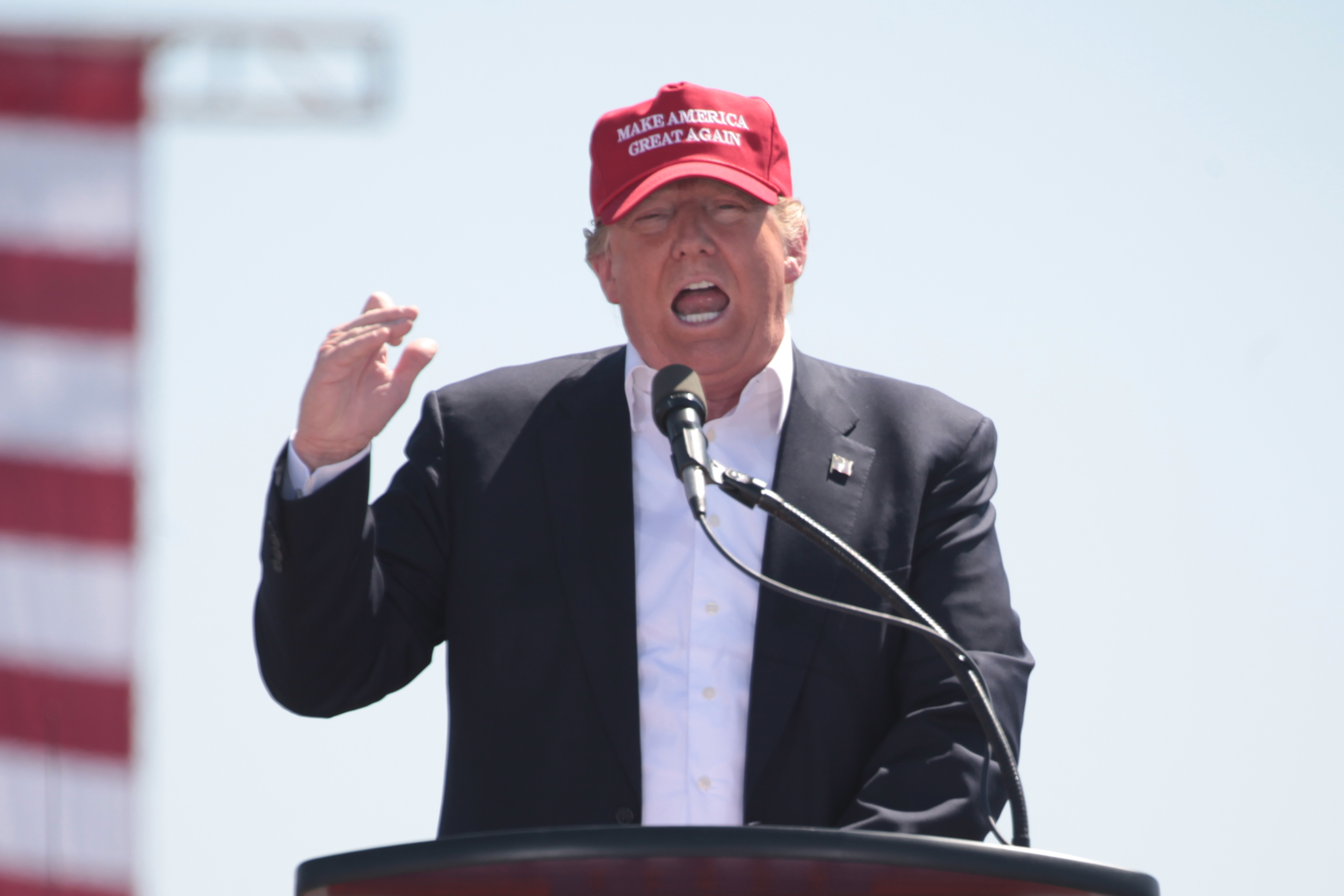
Trump speaks at Fountain Park in Fountain Hills, Arizona.

Seven states and one territory voted between March 22 and April 19, 2016, totaling 315 delegates with New York the largest (winner-take-most, 95), followed by Arizona (winner-take-all, 58).

The final debate between the candidates, which had been scheduled to take place on March 21, 2016, in Salt Lake City, was cancelled after Trump and Kasich withdrew from the event. Trump had initially announced that he would be absent as there had been enough debates; Kasich subsequently stated that he would not attend a debate without Trump.

On March 22, with concerns about the border, immigration and national security at the fore, Trump won all 58 delegates in Arizona. However, in Utah, Cruz garnered 69% of the vote, triggering the 50% rule to take all 40 delegates, buoyed by anti-Trump sentiment among many Mormons. All of American Samoa's delegates were uncommitted. After Trump was declared the presumptive nominee, all of the American Samoa delegates committed to him. American Samoa and Utah were the last caucuses of the 2016 Republican primary season.

As a Trump nomination became even more likely, the Club for Growth and other backers of the Stop Trump movement began adopting increasingly drastic strategies to derail his nomination, including all-out opposition to him in Wisconsin, seen as one opportunity to deny him the 1,237 delegates needed to clinch the nomination. Trump stated that he foresaw the outbreak of riots if he were denied the nomination at the convention. Despite often being viewed as anathema to the establishment, Cruz began picking up endorsements of establishment figures dismayed by the prospect of a Trump nomination, including that of Romney just before the Utah primary, Bush on March 23, 2016, and Walker on March 29, 2016.

Toward the end of March, the competition between the three remaining candidates grew even fiercer. The increasingly acrimonious back-and-forth between Cruz and Trump took a new turn after the National Enquirer accused Cruz of being involved in five extramarital affairs – claims Cruz denied, accusing Trump of planting the claim, but other sources linked it to Rubio's suspended campaign. On March 29, the same day Walker endorsed Cruz, at a GOP town hall event hosted by CNN, all three remaining Republican candidates distanced themselves from the vow they had taken in September to support their party's eventual nominee. Referring to the pledge, Kasich stated, "all of us shouldn't even have answered that question".

April 3 had a North Dakota convention where Cruz gained support of eight delegates and Trump got one. Cruz later got six extra delegates committed to him. After Cruz dropped out, three delegates switched their support to Trump. The 13 uncommitted delegates backed Trump, giving him the support of 17 delegates and a majority. On April 5, buoyed by support from Walker and the state's talk and national radio hosts, Cruz won the statewide contests by a 48–35% margin and six congressional districts at the Wisconsin primary for 36 delegates. Trump won two congressional districts for six delegates.

Following the Wisconsin primary, the three candidates moved on to Trump's home state of New York for its April 19 primary. Trump and Kasich teamed up to assail Cruz for his earlier criticism of Trump's "New York values", while Cruz reiterated his claim that Trump has an inconsistent conservative record and stated that "the only reason Kasich is attacking me now is because Kasich is afraid of going against Trump if I dropped out." Trump also received the support of former New York mayor and 2008 presidential candidate Rudy Giuliani during the lead-up to the New York primary. On April 9, 2016, Cruz won the Colorado delegates after taking a solid majority, the state's four uncommitted delegates declaring support for Cruz, bringing his total delegate count in Colorado to 34. On April 16, 2016, Cruz won all 14 at-large delegates in the Wyoming state convention. He also received the support of RNC Committeewoman Marti Halverson, one of the 3 RNC delegates to the convention.

On April 19, Trump won New York with 59% of the vote, taking 89 of its 95 delegates. Kasich was a distant second with 25% of the vote, taking the other six delegates. Cruz was completely shut-out from receiving any New York delegates, coming in third place with only 15% of the vote, as the threshold for obtaining any delegates was 20%. Following the New York primary, Cruz was mathematically eliminated from reaching the majority of 1,237 delegates to earn the nomination on the first ballot, as he needed 678 more while only 674 were available.

March 22 – April 19 results
Candidate	Trump	Cruz	Kasich	Uncom.	Total
Delegates won	154	123	6	5	288
Popular vote	1,254,994 (43.9%)	974,360 (34.1%)	485,025 (17.0%)	2,293	2,857,840
States won	3+AS	4	0	0	7+AS
American Samoa^{*}	9	0	0	0	—N/a
Arizona	46%	28%	11%	–	—N/a
Utah	14%	69%	17%	–	—N/a
North Dakota^{*}	17	11	0	0	—N/a
Wisconsin	35%	48%	14%	0.2%	—N/a
Colorado^{#}	1	29+4 (Note: Four Colorado delegates, while elected as unbound, have decided to vote for Cruz at the GOP's National Convention)	0	3	—N/a
Wyoming (Note: The Wyoming GOP elected the remaining 14 of 26 delegates at its State Convention from April 14–16.)^{#}	0	14	0	2	—N/a
New York	59%	15%	25%	–	—N/a

^{*} The delegate count is given for American Samoa and North Dakota as no tally of the vote has been released. All delegates from American Samoa are unpledged. All delegates from North Dakota are unbound but some have declared support (committed to) for a candidate (they can still change their minds).
^{#}The delegate count from Colorado and Wyoming is given because there is no tally for popular vote. These delegates, however, can choose to be bound to a candidate or to be left uncommitted. They indicated this when they filed to run for a delegate spot.

=== April 26, 2016: Acela primary ===
GOP candidates jockey for delegate 'free agents' in Virginia - video news report published on April 29, 2016 from the PBS News Hour

On April 26, 2016, five Northeastern primaries were contested—Connecticut, Delaware, Maryland, Pennsylvania and Rhode Island—and were collectively termed the "Amtrak" or "Acela primary" in reference to the Acela Express, which runs through the area. All five primaries were won by Trump by overwhelming margins between 29% and 41%. Trump received over 54% of the vote in all five. He claimed all the delegates available in Connecticut, Delaware and Maryland, as well as all 17 pledged delegates in Pennsylvania. Pennsylvania also elected 54 unpledged delegates and both the Trump campaign and The Washington Post estimated that Trump would win the support of at least 39 of the Keystone State's 54 unpledged delegates.

Only in Rhode Island, where delegates were allocated proportionally, did Kasich (5) or Cruz (2) win any pledged delegates. Trump attained 12 of the 19 there and 111 of the 118 by the end of the night. The night was also notable as Trump cleared 10 million votes, surpassing the vote total attained by McCain and Romney in 2008 and 2012 respectively. The two aforementioned contests were won with the candidate receiving a majority of the popular vote nationwide in both 2008 and 2012.

The next day, Trump received the support of 31 unbound delegates from Pennsylvania, while Cruz nabbed four of them, Kasich three, and five remained uncommitted. On April 28, 2016, a Trump rally in Costa Mesa, California, attracted protests that turned violent, with approximately twenty people arrested and a police car vandalized. On April 29, the Trump campaign declared that they had accumulated 1,001 delegates, only 236 from the 1,237 necessary for the nomination.

April 26 results
Candidate	Trump	Kasich	Cruz	Uncom.	Total
Delegates won	111	5	2	6	124
Popular vote	1,356,152 (56.5%)	506,327 (21.1%)	475,112 (19.8%)	3,145	2,399,257
States won	5	0	0	0	5
Connecticut	58%	28%	12%	1%	—N/a
Delaware	61%	20%	16%	–	—N/a
Maryland	54%	23%	19%	–	—N/a
Pennsylvania	57%	19%	22%	–	—N/a
Rhode Island	63%	24%	10%	1%	—N/a

=== May 3, 2016: Indiana primary ===
Five primaries were contested in May: Indiana, Nebraska, West Virginia, Oregon and Washington, with Indiana awarding the most, with 57 delegates. By late April, Cruz and Kasich had both been eliminated from getting 1,237 delegates, but they still had a chance to accumulate enough delegates to force a contested convention in Cleveland. Realizing this, Cruz and Kasich attempted to focus their efforts in different states, with Cruz challenging Trump head-to-head in Indiana and Kasich challenging Trump in Oregon and New Mexico.

The Indiana primary, whose delegates were awarded winner-take all statewide and by congressional district, was seen as essential to denying Trump the 1,237 delegates needed to secure the nomination. Following the Acela primaries, Cruz attempted to bolster his chances by announcing that, if nominated, he would name Fiorina as his running mate. Fiorina had served as a Cruz campaign surrogate since endorsing him in March after suspending her own presidential campaign in February and Cruz hoped that Fiorina could help his campaign in Indiana and her home state of California.

On April 29, 2016, Governor Mike Pence of Indiana announced that he would vote for Cruz in the primary election. Although Trump was outspent by a margin of more than 4–1, he handily won Indiana with 53.3% of the vote, winning a plurality in every Congressional District and taking all 57 delegates. Cruz subsequently dropped out of the race, eliminating any hope of a contested convention in July. As a result, Republican National Committee chairman Reince Priebus tweeted that Trump was the presumptive nominee in the GOP. The next day, Kasich suspended his campaign, leaving Trump as the only candidate in the race. Many Republican leaders and even former presidential candidates endorsed Trump after the withdrawal of Kasich and Cruz, but other party leaders such as Ryan, Romney and the entire Bush family withheld their support, although Ryan endorsed Trump on June 2, 2016.

May 3 results
Candidate	Trump	Cruz	Kasich	Total
Delegates won	57	0	0	57
Popular vote	591,514 (53.3%)	406,783 (36.6%)	84,111 (7.6%)	1,110,543
States won	1	0	0	1
Indiana	53%	37%	8%	—N/a

=== May 2016: Trump as presumptive nominee ===
Between the Indiana primary and the final primaries in June, 142 delegates were awarded. With Trump the only candidate remaining, Washington, Oregon, West Virginia and Nebraska became essentially uncontested, although Cruz and Kasich remained on the ballot. Trump won handily in West Virginia, Nebraska and Oregon, although Kasich received one delegate from West Virginia and five in Oregon, while Cruz took five in Oregon as well. The next week, Trump won decisively in Washington State, taking 76% of the vote and 41 of 44 delegates, with the other three uncommitted.

May 10–24 results
Candidate	Trump	Kasich	Cruz	Uncom.	Total
Delegates won	127	6	5	4	142
Popular vote	987,336 (70.5%)	157,632 (11.3%)	185,689 (13.3%)	–	1,399,967
States won	4	0	0	0	4
Nebraska	61%	11%	18%	–	—N/a
West Virginia	77%	6%	9%	–	—N/a
Oregon	64%	16%	17%	–	—N/a
Washington	75%	10%	11%	–	—N/a

After becoming the presumptive Republican nominee, Trump said regarding the Republican primaries: "You've been hearing me say it's a rigged system, but now I don't say it anymore because I won. It's true. Now I don't care."

On May 26, 2016, the Associated Press announced that Trump had passed the threshold of 1,237 delegates required to guarantee his nomination, thanks to unbound delegates from North Dakota who declared their support for Trump.

=== June 2016: final primaries ===
The final five primary contests were held on June 7, 2016, in California, Montana, New Jersey, New Mexico and South Dakota, with California awarding the most with 172 delegates and New Jersey with 51. Though initially pegged by pundits as being an important primary, the suspension of the Cruz and Kasich campaigns following the Indiana primary made the California primary merely a formality at that point, as Trump shattered the all-time record for votes in the Republican primaries set by George W. Bush in 2000 of 12,034,676 votes. After the final primaries, his vote total was 14,015,993 (44.9%), almost 2 million votes higher than the previous record.

June 7 results
Candidate	Trump	Total
Delegates won	303	303
Popular vote	2,259,716 (75.2%)	3,003,652
States won	5	
California	75%	—N/a
Montana	74%	—N/a
New Jersey	80%	—N/a
New Mexico	71%	—N/a
South Dakota	67%	—N/a

=== July 2016: National Convention ===
The 2016 Republican National Convention was held from July 18–21 at the Quicken Loans Arena in Cleveland. The delegates selected the Republican presidential and vice presidential nominees and wrote the party platform. A simple majority of 1,237 delegates was needed to win the presidential nomination. Following Trump's decisive win in Indiana and the subsequent suspension of the Cruz and Kasich campaigns, as well as Trump reaching the threshold following his decisive win in Washington state, it became clear that there would not be a contested convention in Cleveland. On the first ballot, Trump won the nomination with 1,725 delegates, 488 more than required. Cruz did not endorse Trump in his speech to the convention, but later endorsed him in September.

== Campaign finance ==
This is an overview of the money used in the campaign as it was reported to Federal Election Committee and released on July 21, 2016. Outside groups are independent expenditure-only committees, also called PACs and SuperPACs. Several such groups normally support each candidate but the numbers in the table are a total of all of them, meaning that a group of committees can be shown as technically insolvent even though it is not the case for all of them. The source of all the numbers is OpenSecrets.

Candidate	Campaign committee (as of June 30)				Outside groups (as of July 21)			Total spent	Suspended campaign
Candidate	Money raised	Money spent	Cash on hand	Debt	Money raised	Money spent	Cash on hand	Total spent	Suspended campaign
Donald Trump	$88,997,986	$68,787,021	$20,210,966	$0^{*}	$9,744,105	$7,620,376	$2,123,729	$76,407,397	Convention
John Kasich	$18,973,502	$17,564,740	$1,408,688	$0	$15,245,069	$20,660,401	$−5,415,332	$38,225,141	May 4
Ted Cruz	$89,322,157	$79,919,142	$9,403,015	$0	$67,463,363	$47,145,301	$20,318,062	$127,064,443	May 3
Marco Rubio	$54,739,824	$51,964,471	$3,316,872	$2,067,041	$61,966,485	$59,868,636	$2,097,849	$111,833,107	March 15
Ben Carson	$62,745,221	$60,873,041	$1,872,180	$266,884	$16,217,786	$16,815,756	$−597,970	$77,688,797	March 4
Jeb Bush	$33,999,149	$33,967,964	$31,185	$261,703^{†}	$121,196,562	$104,124,340	$17,072,222	$138,092,304	February 20
Jim Gilmore	$383,500	$383,300	$200	$0	$342,200	$368,600	$−125,050	$751,900	February 12
Chris Christie	$8,294,352	$8,163,565	$130,786	$383,518^{†}	$23,654,517	$23,146,491	$508,026	$31,310,056	February 10
Carly Fiorina	$11,932,371	$10,683,201	$1,249,170	$0	$14,565,281	$13,924,385	$640,896	$24,607,586	February 10
Rick Santorum	$1,365,073	$1,361,497	$3,576	$556,860^{†}	$714,251	$1,143,235	$−428,984	$2,504,732	February 3
Rand Paul	$12,101,426	$12,020,383	$81,044	$317,365^{†}	$10,856,091	$8,907,098	$1,948,994	$20,927,481	February 3
Mike Huckabee	$4,290,564	$4,276,260	$14,304	$19,204	$5,874,843	$6,126,465	$−251,622	$10,402,725	February 1
George Pataki	$544,183	$524,850	$5,301	$0	$1,547,674	$1,547,674	$0	$2,072,524	December 29
Lindsey Graham	$5,423,113	$5,370,216	$52,898	$43,041	$4,560,305	$4,391,365	$168,940	$9,761,581	December 21
Bobby Jindal	$1,442,464	$1,442,464	$0	$0	$4,517,207	$4,517,938	$−730	$5,960,401	November 17
Scott Walker	$7,893,839	$7,877,050	$16,789	$898,676^{†}	$24,554,588	$24,489,961	$64,627	$32,367,011	September 21
Rick Perry	$1,427,133	$1,767,404	$1,818	$0	$15,231,068	$15,356,117	$−125,050	$17,123,521	September 11
Total	$314,877,871	$298,159,548	$17,587,826	$2,396,170	$388,507,290	$352,533,763	$35,874,878	$650,693,310	N/A

Notes

^{*}Trump has so far self-financed his campaign with $36,243,646, most of this as loans.

^{†}Technically insolvent

== Process ==
U.S. States by the Total Number of Delegates (Republican Party).

U.S. States & Territories Election Method: Primary Open Semi-Closed Closed / Caucus Open Semi-Closed Closed

Delegate allocation rules by state and territory

Schedule of primary elections, by month and/or date

The Republican National Committee (RNC) imposed strict new rules for states wishing to hold early contests in 2016. Under these rules, no state was permitted to hold a primary or caucus in January. Only Iowa, New Hampshire, South Carolina and Nevada were entitled to February contests. States with primaries or caucuses in early March were to award their delegates proportionally.

Any state that might have violated these rules was to have their delegation to the 2016 convention severely cut: states with more than 30 delegates would have been deprived of all but nine, plus RNC members from that state. States with fewer than 30 would have been reduced to six, plus RNC members. In contrast to the 2012 cycle, no states violated these rules.

The Republican Party presidential primaries and caucuses are indirect elections in which voters allocated or elect delegates to the 2016 Republican National Convention. These delegates can be bound or unbound to vote for a particular candidate. The election of the state delegation can happen directly or indirectly as the primary election table below shows.

- Date: The date given in the first column is the date of the popular primary or caucus in a particular state or territory. This event may or may not allocate delegates. Two more dates are also important in the process: the date on which Congressional District delegates are (s)elected, and the date on which state delegates are (s)elected. Some events stretch for more than one day; in these cases the date stated in the table is the final day of the event.
- State delegation: Each delegation is made up of up to three kinds of delegates: party members, delegates from the congressional districts and delegates from the state at-large. They can either be bound, meaning that they are legally bound to vote for a particular candidate in the first ballot at the National Convention, or they can be unbound, meaning that they are free to vote for any candidate at the National Convention. Bound delegates' voting obligations are not necessarily in line with their own personal views, and thus cannot always be used as an indicator as to how a certain delegate will vote should there be more than one ballot at the convention. If a candidate suspends his campaign, the delegates allocated and/or elected to him may become unbound or stay bound depending on state rules
  - RNC: Three Republican National Committee members from each state will go to the National Convention as delegates. Most of them will be bound to a candidate according to the result of the primary or caucuses. Only fifteen RNC members will be unbound, their states and territories are marked with a footnote.
  - AL: At Large delegates are elected as representatives of the whole state. Each state is allotted ten delegates and each territory six delegates. Each state can on top of this get bonus delegates based on whether it has a Republican governor, it has Republican majorities in one or all chambers of its state legislature, and whether it has Republican majorities in its delegation to the U.S. Congress, among other factors. With the exception of Missouri all these delegates are allocated at the state level.
  - CD: Each Congregational District have been assigned three delegates. These are allocated either on the District or State level according to state rules.
- Allocation: Delegates can either be allocated or unallocated at the starting primary or caucuses. They can be allocated to a candidate or as uncommitted. Those delegates that are not allocated at the starting event will later be elected either bound to a candidate or uncommitted also called unbound. The contests that allocate delegates on state and district levels use the following allocating systems:
  - Winner-take-all. The candidate receiving the most votes is allocated all the delegates. A few states allocated all their delegates based solely on the statewide vote, but most allocated the AL delegates based on the statewide vote and the CD delegates based on the district vote in each districts. This means a candidate can "win" a state without getting all the delegates in that state's delegation.
  - Proportional. All candidates receive delegates in accordance with the popular vote at the primary or caucuses.
  - Winner-take-most. This is a hybrid of winner-take-all and proportional. The delegates are allocated proportionally but different rules ensure that only the leading candidates take part in the allocation. If a candidate gets more than a certain threshold of the votes he will be allocated all the delegates, otherwise it is allocated proportionally. High thresholds are in place in winner-take-most primaries or caucuses. Additional rules are also in place in some states.
  - Direct election. Instead of voting for a candidate at the primary or caucuses the voters elect the delegates directly. The delegates can state their presidential preference (and be elected on a particular candidate's "ticket") or they can be elected as uncommitted.
- Election: Delegates are elected before, at the same time or after the starting event depending on the allocation method and the state rules.
  - Convention. This including Congressional District Conventions, Congressional District Caucuses at State Conventions, Summer Meetings, State and CD delegation selection meetings and State Conventions where delegates are elected. Conventions where National Delegates are not (s)elected have not been included in the tablet.
  - Direct election. The National Convention delegates are elected directly on the ballot. They will either be bound, as a delegation, to the result of the contest or they will individually state on the ballot what candidate they will be bound to or if they wish to be elected as unbound delegates depending.
  - Slate. A slate can be made up in three ways: all candidates submitting a slate before the primary or caucuses, the winning candidate submitting their slate after the primary or caucuses, or the State Committee or Convention making up the slates before the primary or caucuses. The allocated delegates are then selected from these slates.
  - Committee. Each state has its own rules and regulations. Ordinarily, the state GOP executive committee or its chairman selects the delegates.

According to Rule 40(b) of the RNC Rules of the Republican Party, enacted prior to the 2012 convention and amended most recently in 2014, nominations at the National Convention may be made only of candidates who demonstrate the support of a majority of delegates of at least eight state delegations. Previously, this had been a lower threshold of a plurality in five states. Per Rule 42, Rules 26–42 are "Standing Rules for this convention (2012) and the temporary rules for the next convention (2016)". While the current candidates operate under these temporary rules, it is unclear whether they will remain in place for the 2016 convention. As of March 16, 2016, RNC Chairman Reince Priebus has not taken a position on the potential rule change, while others in the party advocate for it.

=== Schedule ===
Date	State	State delegation (only voting delegates)						Allocation			Election (CD)		Election (AL)		Thres- hold
Date	State	RNC	AL	CD	Total	U	B	Contest	AL	CD	Date	Type	Date	Type	Thres- hold
Feb 1	Iowa	3	15	12	30	0	30 (Note: Iowa's delegates are bound for the first ballot to the candidates of their allocation even if the candidates have suspended their campaigns. This applies to fourteen delegates allocated to Bush, Carson, Fiorina, Huckabee, Paul and Rubio. If only one candidate is put forward for nomination at the National Convention Iowa's delegates are bound to vote for that candidate providing he received votes in caucuses)	Caucus (closed)	Proportional	Proportional (Note: Delegates are allocated in each Congregational District based on the statewide result – Not based on the result in the District – but they are elected at the District Conventions.)	Apr 9	Convention	May 21	Convention	N/A
Feb 9	New Hampshire	3	20	0	23	3 (Note: Delegates bound to a candidate who later suspends his campaign become unbound in some states. This applies to 3 delegates from New Hampshire elected on the Bush slate and 29 delegates allocated to Rubio from Minnesota (17), Arkansas (9), New Hampshire (2) and Wyoming (1). Additionally, Ben Carson released in writing 2 delegates allocated to him from Nevada.)	18	Primary (semi-closed)	Proportional	N/A	N/A	N/A	Feb 9	Slate	10%
Feb 20	South Carolina	3	26	21	50	0	50	Primary (open)	Winner-take-all	Winner-take-all	April	Convention	May 7	Convention	N/A
Feb 23	Nevada	3	27	0	30	2	28	Caucus (closed)	Proportional	N/A	N/A	N/A	May 7	Convention	3.33% (Note: 3.33% refers to one delegate out of 30, or 1/30.)
Mar 1	Alabama	3	26	21	50	0	50	Primary (open)	Winner-take-most	Winner-take-most	Mar 1	Slate	Mar 1	Slate	20%
Mar 1	Alaska	3	25	0	28	0	28	Caucus (closed)	Proportional	N/A	N/A	N/A	Apr 28	Convention	13%
Mar 1	Arkansas	3	25	12	40	9	31	Primary (open)	Winner-take-most	Winner-take-most	Apr 30	Convention	May 14	Committee	15%
Mar 1	Colorado	3	13	21	37	7	30	Caucus (closed)	(No allocation)	(No allocation)	Apr 8	Convention (Note: Delegates indicate on the ballot what candidate they wish to be bound to or if they wish to be elected as unbound.)	Apr 9	Convention	N/A
Mar 1	Georgia	3	31	42	76	0	76	Primary (open)	Winner-take-most	Winner-take-most	Apr 16	Convention	June 3	Convention	20%
Mar 1	Massachusetts	3	12	27	42	0	42	Primary (semi-closed)	Proportional	Proportional	Apr 23	Convention	June 3	Committee	5%
Mar 1	Minnesota	3	11	24	38	17	21	Caucus (open)	Proportional	Proportional	May 7	Convention	May 21	Convention	10%
Mar 1	North Dakota	3	25	0	28	28	0	Caucus (closed)	(No allocation)	N/A	N/A	N/A	Apr 3	Convention	N/A
Mar 1	Oklahoma	3	25	15	43	3	40	Primary (closed)	Winner-take-most	Winner-take-most	Apr 16	Convention	May 14	Convention	15%
Mar 1	Tennessee	3	28	27	58	0	58	Primary (open)	Winner-take-most	Winner-take-most	Mar 1	Direct Elec.	Apr 2	Direct Elec. (Note: Tennessee: half of its at-large delegates will be elected by the State Executive Committee in accordance with the binding primary result)	20%
Mar 1	Texas	3	44	108	155	0	155	Primary (open)	Winner-take-most	Winner-take-most	May 14	Convention	May 14	Convention	20%
Mar 1	Vermont	3	13	0	16	0	16	Primary (open)	Winner-take-most	N/A	N/A	N/A	May 21	Convention	20%
Mar 1	Virginia	3	13	33	49	0	49	Primary (open)	Proportional	Proportional	May 21	Convention	Apr 30	Convention	N/A
Mar 1	Wyoming	3	14	12	29	5	24	Caucus (closed)	(No allocation)	(No allocation)	Mar 12	Convention (Note: Wyoming has only one congressional district, so the 12 CD delegates are elected in the 23 counties that are paired together.)	Apr 16	Convention	N/A
Mar 5	Kansas	3	25	12	40	0	40	Caucus (closed)	Proportional	Proportional	Apr 23	Convention	May 21	Committee	10%
Mar 5	Kentucky	3	25	18	46	0	46	Caucus (closed)	Proportional	Proportional	May 17	Convention	May 18	Convention	5%
Mar 5	Louisiana	3	25	18	46	5	41	Primary (closed)	Proportional	Proportional	Mar 12	Convention	Mar 12	Convention	20%
Mar 5	Maine	3	14	6	23	0	23	Caucus (closed)	Winner-take-most	Winner-take-most	Apr 22	Convention	Apr 22	Convention	10%
Mar 6	Puerto Rico	3	20	0	23	0	23	Primary (open)	Winner-take-most	N/A	N/A	N/A	Mar 6	Direct Elec.	20%
Mar 8	Hawaii	3	10	6	19	0	19	Caucus (closed)	Proportional	Proportional	Mar 8	Slate	Mar 8	Slate	N/A
Mar 8	Idaho	3	29	0	32	0	32	Primary (closed)	Winner-take-most	N/A	N/A	N/A	Jun 4	Convention	20%
Mar 8	Michigan	3	14	42	59	0	59	Primary (open)	Winner-take-most	N/A	Apr 8	Convention	Apr 9	Convention	15%
Mar 8	Mississippi	3	25	12	40	0	40	Primary (open)	Proportional	Winner-take-most	May 14	Convention	May 14	Convention	15%
Mar 10	U.S. Virgin Islands (Note: The six uncommitted candidates originally elected at the caucus were ruled ineligible and replaced.)	3	6	0	9	5	4	Caucus (closed)	Direct Elec.	N/A	N/A	N/A	Mar 10	Convention	N/A
Mar 12	District of Columbia	3	16	0	19	0	19	Convention (closed)	Winner-take-most	N/A	N/A	N/A	Mar 12	Convention	15%
Mar 12	Guam	3	6	0	9	9	0	Caucus (closed)	(No allocation)	N/A	N/A	N/A	Mar 12	Convention	N/A
Mar 15	Florida	0	18	81	99	0	99	Primary (closed)	Winner-take-all	Winner-take-all	Jun 3	Convention	Jun 3	Committee	N/A
Mar 15	Illinois	3	12	54	69	0	69	Primary (open)	Winner-take-all	Direct Elec.	Mar 15	Direct Elec.	May 22	Convention	N/A
Mar 15	Missouri	3	25 (Note: 16 delegates allocated in CD will be elected as at-large delegates at the state convention)	24	52	0	52	Primary (open)	Winner-take-all	Proportional	Apr 30	Convention	Jun 2	Convention	N/A
Mar 15	Northern Mariana Is.	3	6	0	9	0	9	Caucus (closed)	Winner-take-all	N/A	N/A	N/A	Mar 15	Direct Elect.	N/A
Mar 15	North Carolina	3	69	0	72	0	72	Primary (semi-closed)	Proportional	Proportional	Apr 27	Convention	May 8	Convention	N/A
Mar 15	Ohio	3	63	0	66	0	66	Primary (semi-closed)	Winner-take-all	N/A	N/A	N/A	Mar 15	Slate	N/A
Mar 22	American Samoa	3	6	0	9	9	0	Caucus (open)	(No allocation)	N/A	N/A	N/A	Mar 22	Convention	N/A
Mar 22	Arizona	3	28	27	58	0	58	Primary (closed)	Winner-take-all	Winner-take-all	Apr 30	Convention	Apr 30	Convention	N/A
Mar 22	Utah	3	37	0	40	0	40	Caucus (semi-closed)	Winner-take-most	N/A	N/A	N/A	Apr 23	Convention	15% (Note: With 69% of all votes Cruz triggered the 50% threshold giving him all the delegates)
Apr 5	Wisconsin	3	15	24	42	0	42	Primary (open)	Winner-take-all	Winner-take-all	Apr 17	Convention	May 14	Slate	N/A
Apr 19	New York	3	11	81	95	0	95	Primary (closed)	Winner-take-most	Winner-take-most	Apr 19	Slate	May 26	Committee	20% (Note: With more than half the votes in both the state contest and 23 out of 27 district contests Trump triggered the 50% threshold giving him all the delegates awarded in these contests)
Apr 26	Connecticut	3	10	15	28	0	28	Primary (closed)	Winner-take-most	Winner-take-all	May 20	Slate	May 20	Slate	20%
Apr 26	Delaware	3	13	0	16	0	16	Primary (closed)	Winner-take-all	N/A	N/A	N/A	Apr 29	Convention	N/A
Apr 26	Maryland	3	11	24	38	0	38	Primary (closed)	Winner-take-all	Winner-take-all	Apr 26	Direct Elec.	May 14	Convention	N/A
Apr 26	Pennsylvania	3	14	54	71	54	17	Primary (closed)	Winner-take-all	(No allocation)	Apr 26	Direct Elec.	May 21	Committee	N/A
Apr 26	Rhode Island	3	10	6	19	0	19	Primary (semi-closed)	Proportional	Proportional	Apr 26	Direct Elec.	Apr 26	Direct Elec.	10%
May 3	Indiana	3	27	27	57	0	57	Primary (open)	Winner-take-all	Winner-take-all	Apr 9	Slate	Apr 13	Slate	N/A
May 10	Nebraska	3	24	9	36	0	36	Primary (semi-closed)	Winner-take-all	Winner-take-all	May 14	Convention	May 14	Convention	N/A
May 10	West Virginia	3	22	9	34	0	34	Primary (semi-closed)	Direct Elec.	Direct Elec.	May 10	Direct Elec.	May 10	Direct Elec.	N/A
May 17	Oregon	3	10	15	28	0	28	Primary (closed)	Proportional	Proportional	Jun 4	Convention	Jun 4	Convention	3.57% (Note: 3.57% refers to one delegate out of 28, or 1/28.)
May 24	Washington	3	11	30	44	0	44	Primary (closed)	Proportional	Winner-take-most	May 24	Slate	May 24	Slate	20%
June 7	California	3	10	159	172	0	172	Primary (closed)	Winner-take-all	Winner-take-all	Jun 7	Slate	Jun 7	Slate	N/A
June 7	Montana	3	24	0	27	0	27	Primary (closed)	Winner-take-all	N/A	N/A	N/A	May 14	Slate	N/A
June 7	New Jersey	3	48	0	51	0	51	Primary (semi-closed)	Winner-take-all	N/A	N/A	N/A	Jun 5	Slate	N/A
June 7	New Mexico	3	12	9	24	0	24	Primary (closed)	Proportional	Proportional	May 21	Convention	May 21	Convention	15%
June 7	South Dakota	3	26	0	29	0	29	Primary (closed)	Winner-take-all	N/A	N/A	N/A	Mar 19	Convention	N/A

- Sources: Official Republican Schedule and Nominating Process, USA Today and The Green Papers

== Close races ==
States where the margin of victory was under 1%:

1. Missouri, Trump by 0.21%

States where the margin of victory was under 5%:

1. District of Columbia, Rubio by 1.76%
2. Arkansas, Trump by 2.29%
3. Vermont, Trump by 2.35%
4. Alaska, Cruz by 2.74%
5. Virginia, Trump by 2.82%
6. Iowa, Cruz by 3.34%
7. North Carolina, Trump by 3.47%
8. Louisiana, Trump by 3.62%
9. Kentucky, Trump by 4.51%

States where the margin of victory was under 10%:

1. Oklahoma, Cruz by 6.05%
2. Minnesota, Rubio by 7.06%
3. Illinois, Trump by 8.57%
4. South Carolina, Trump by 9.99%

States where the margin of victory was under 20%:

1. Ohio, Kasich by 11.08%
2. Hawaii, Trump by 11.11%
3. Mississippi, Trump by 11.12%
4. Michigan, Trump by 11.62%
5. Wisconsin, Cruz by 13.02%
6. Maine, Cruz by 13.31%
7. Tennessee, Trump by 14.23%
8. Georgia, Trump by 14.36%
9. Indiana, Trump by 16.62%
10. Texas, Cruz by 17.01%
11. Idaho, Cruz by 17.33%
12. Arizona, Trump by 18.34%
13. Florida, Trump by 18.64%
14. New Hampshire, Trump by 19.52%

== See also ==
Related

- 2016 Republican Party vice presidential candidate selection
- Nationwide opinion polling for the Republican Party 2016 presidential primaries
- Statewide opinion polling for the 2016 Republican Party presidential primaries
- 2016 Republican Party presidential debates and forums
- Republican Party presidential primaries

National conventions

- 2016 Constitution Party National Convention
- 2016 Democratic National Convention
- 2016 Green National Convention
- 2016 Libertarian National Convention
- 2016 Republican National Convention

Presidential primaries

- 2016 Democratic Party presidential primaries
- 2016 Constitution Party presidential primaries
- 2016 Green Party presidential primaries
- 2016 Libertarian Party presidential primaries
