= 2016 Nebraska Republican presidential primary =

- May 10, 2016

36 pledged delegates to the Republican National Convention
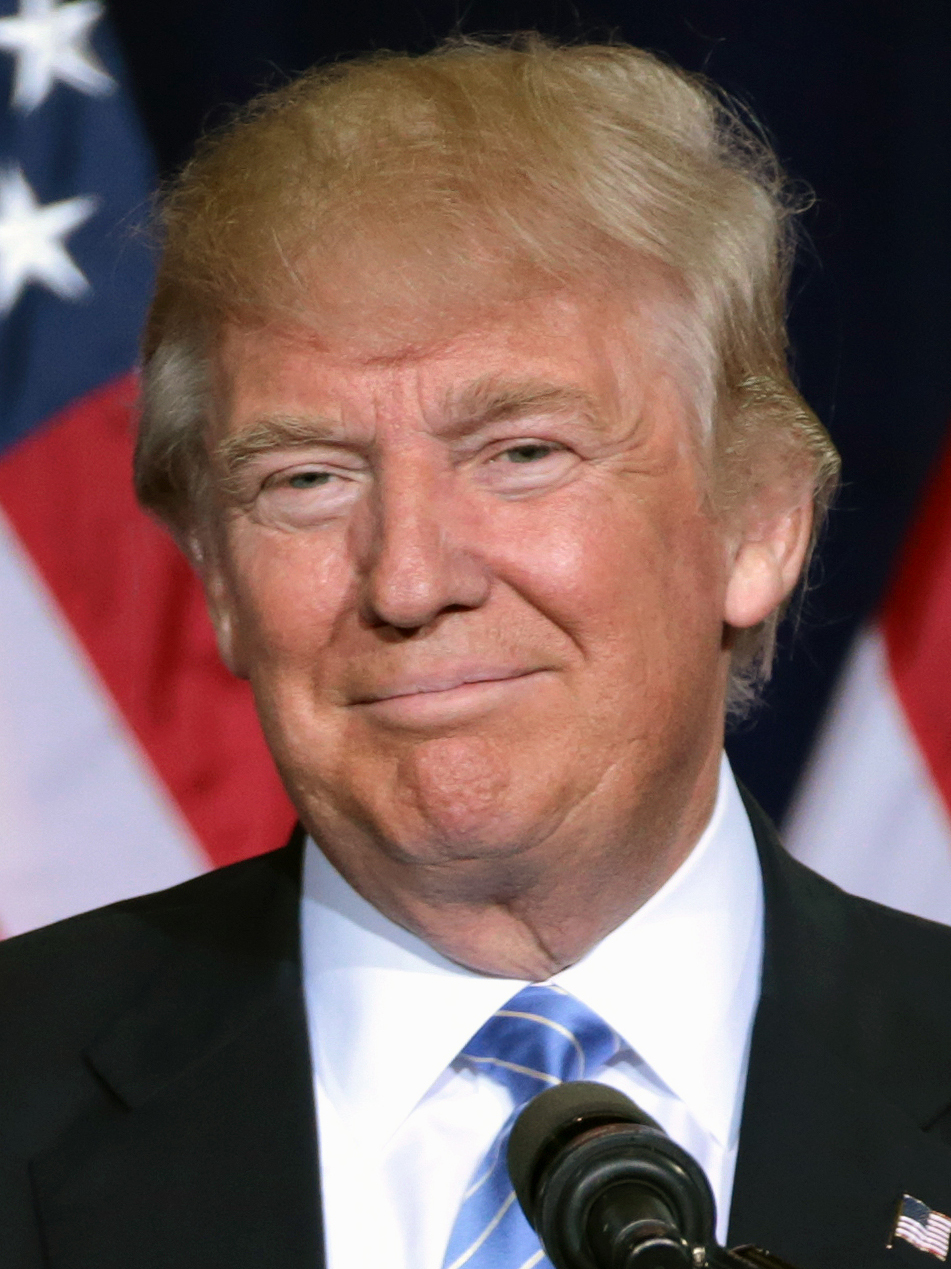

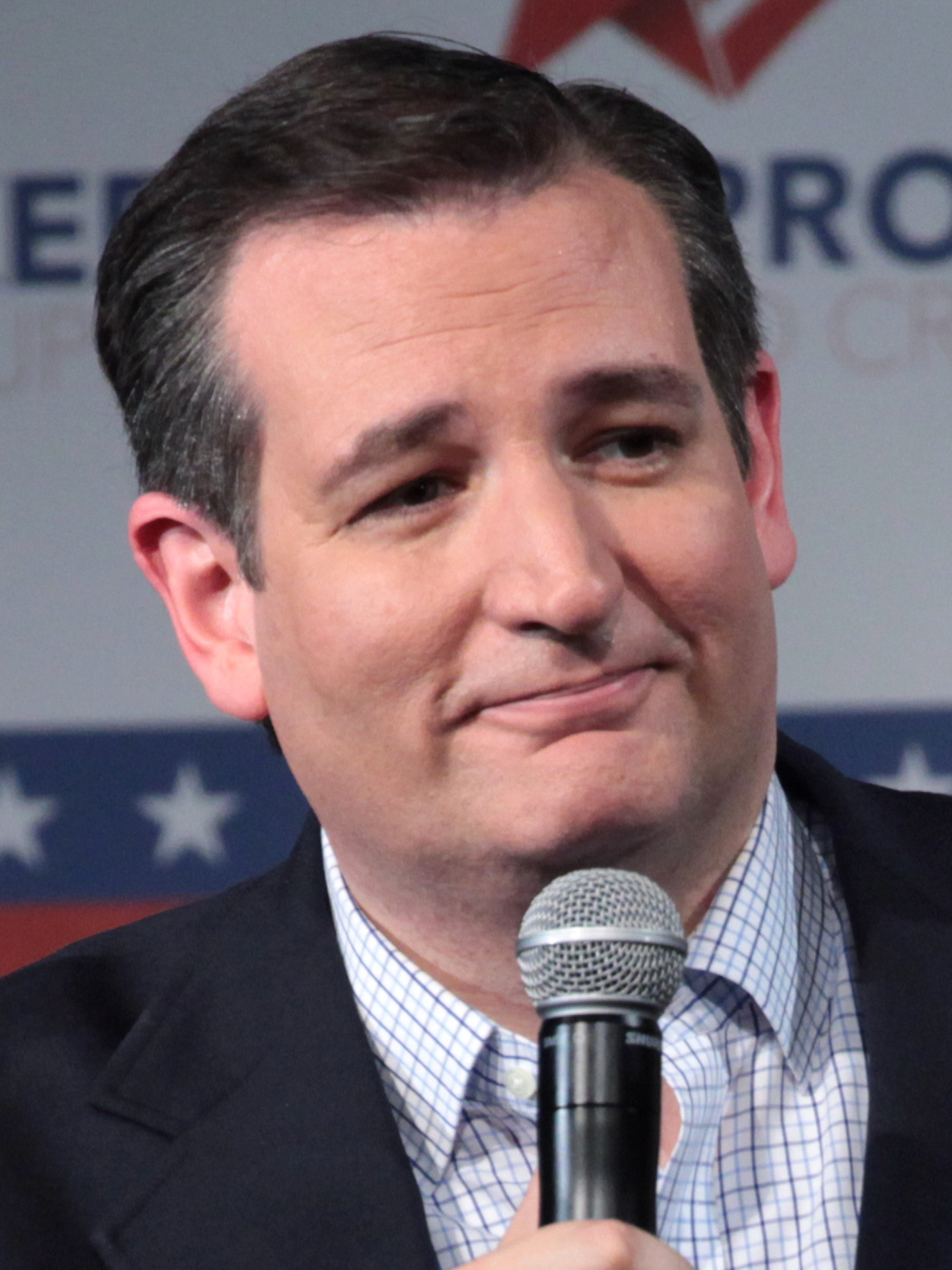

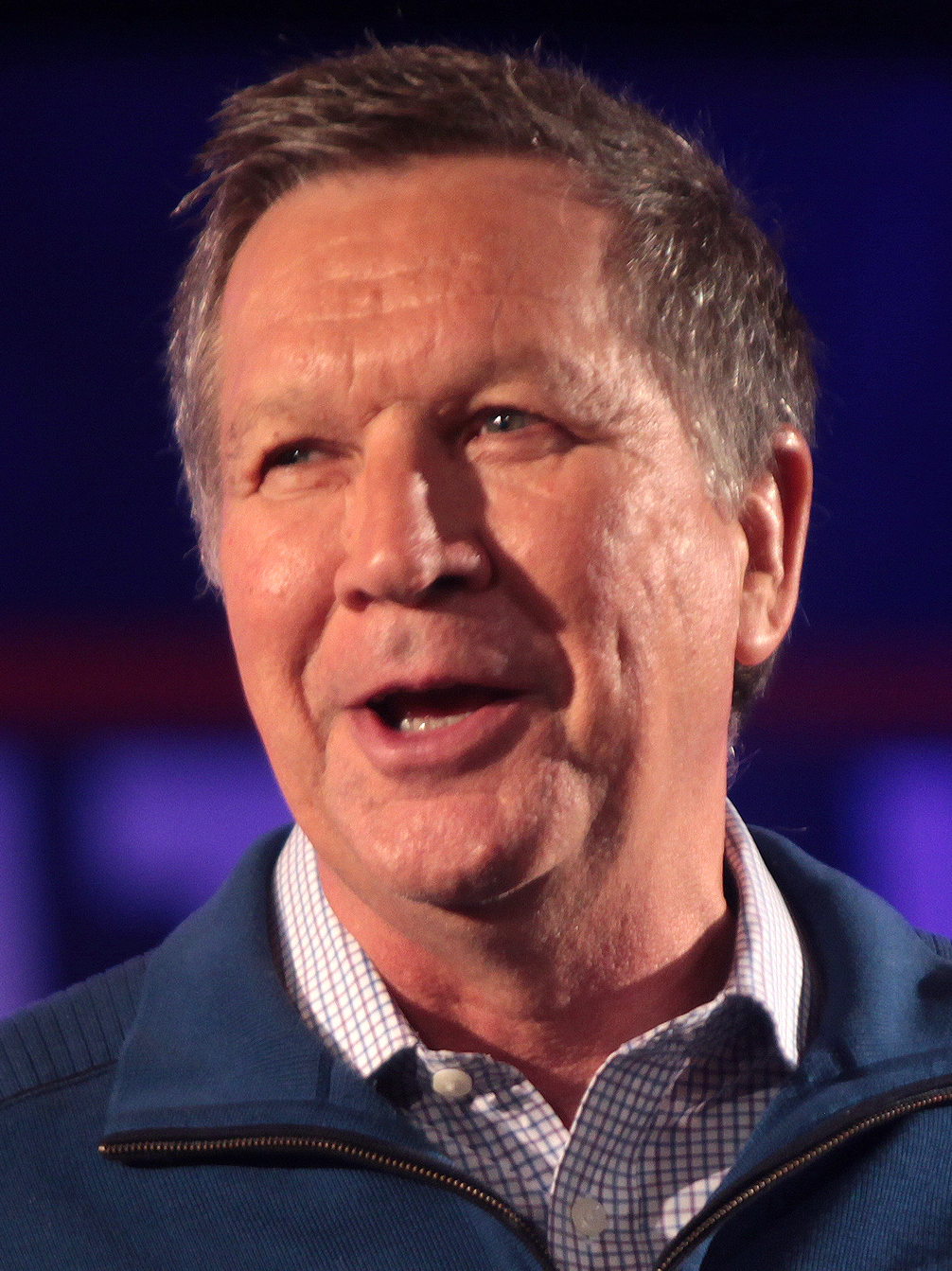

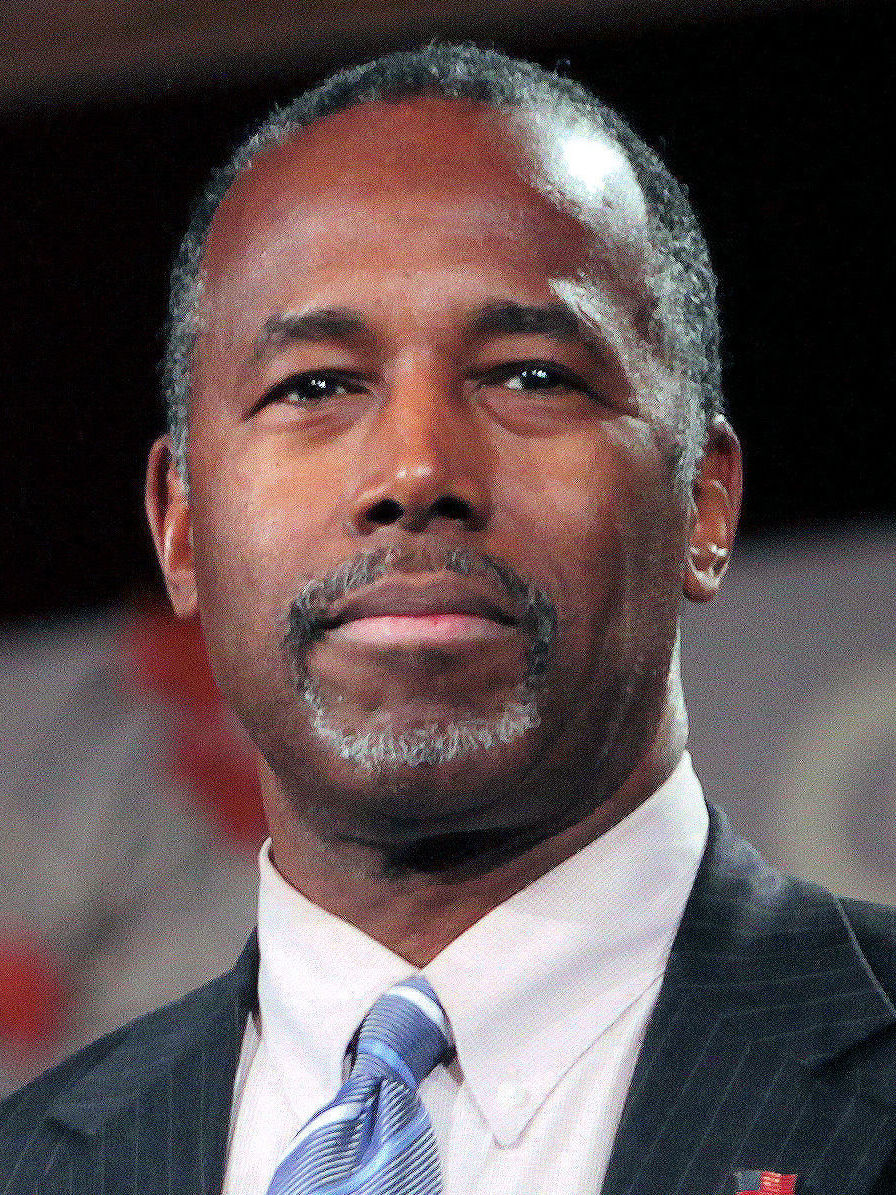
| Candidate | Donald Trump | Ted Cruz (withdrawn) |
| Home state | New York | Texas |
| Delegate count | 36 | 0 |
| Popular vote | 122,327 | 36,703 |
| Percentage | 61.47% | 18.44% |
| Candidate | John Kasich (withdrawn) | Ben Carson (withdrawn) |
| Home state | Ohio | Maryland |
| Delegate count | 0 | 0 |
| Popular vote | 22,709 | 10,016 |
| Percentage | 11.41% | 5.03% |
County results
Donald Trump
40–50%
50–60%
60–70%
70–80%

The 2016 Nebraska Republican presidential primary was held on May 10 in the U.S. state of Nebraska as one of the Republican Party's primaries ahead of the 2016 presidential election. The only candidate on the ballot who did not withdraw was Donald Trump.

The Libertarian Party held their own Nebraska primary on the same day. The Democratic Party held their Nebraska caucuses on March 5.

== Opinion polling ==
List of polls
Main article: United States presidential election in Nebraska, 2016

Winner: Donald Trump
Primary date: May 10, 2016

| Poll source | Date | 1st | 2nd | 3rd | Other |
|---|---|---|---|---|---|
| Primary results | May 10, 2016 | Donald Trump; 61.43% | Ted Cruz; 18.45% | John Kasich; 11.41% | Ben Carson 5.08%, Marco Rubio 3.63% |
| Harper Polling Margin of error: ± 4% Sample size: 565 | February 3–4, 2014 | Rand Paul; 13.41% | Paul Ryan; 12.85% | Chris Christie; 12.66% | Ted Cruz 12.66%, Marco Rubio 8.38%, Scott Walker 8.38%, Bobby Jindal 5.03%, Rick Santorum 4.66%, Undecided 21.97% |

== Results ==
Nebraska Republican primary, May 10, 2016
| Candidate | Votes | Percentage | Actual delegate count | | |
| Candidate | Votes | Percentage | Bound | Unbound | Total |
|---|---|---|---|---|---|
| Donald Trump | 122,327 | 61.47% | 36 | 0 | 36 |
| Ted Cruz (withdrawn) | 36,703 | 18.44% | 0 | 0 | 0 |
| John Kasich (withdrawn) | 22,709 | 11.41% | 0 | 0 | 0 |
| Ben Carson (withdrawn) | 10,016 | 5.03% | 0 | 0 | 0 |
| Marco Rubio (withdrawn) | 7,233 | 3.63% | 0 | 0 | 0 |
| Unprojected delegates: | | | 0 | 0 | 0 |
| Total: | 198,988 | 100.00% | 36 | 0 | 36 |
Source: The Green Papers

== See also ==
- 2016 Nebraska Democratic presidential caucuses and primary
