= Timeline of the 2016 United States presidential election =

- November 8, 2016

The following is a timeline of major events leading up to, during, and after the 2016 United States presidential election. The election was the 58th quadrennial United States presidential election, held on November 8, 2016. The presidential primaries and caucuses were held between February 1 and June 14, 2016, staggered among the 50 states, Washington, D.C., and U.S. territories. The U.S. Congress certified the electoral result on January 6, 2017, and the new president and vice president were inaugurated on January 20, 2017.

Republican Party ticket

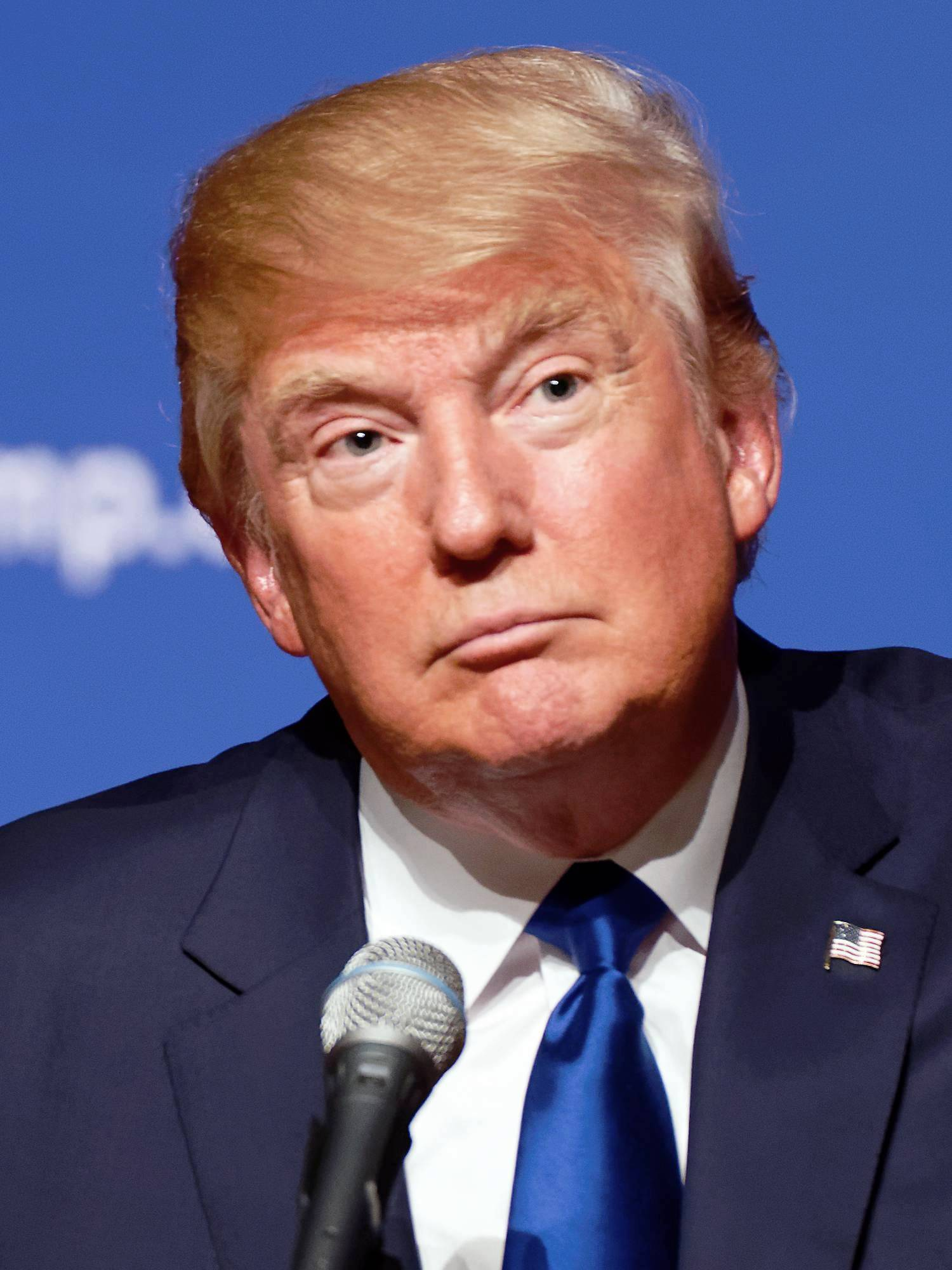
Businessman Donald Trump

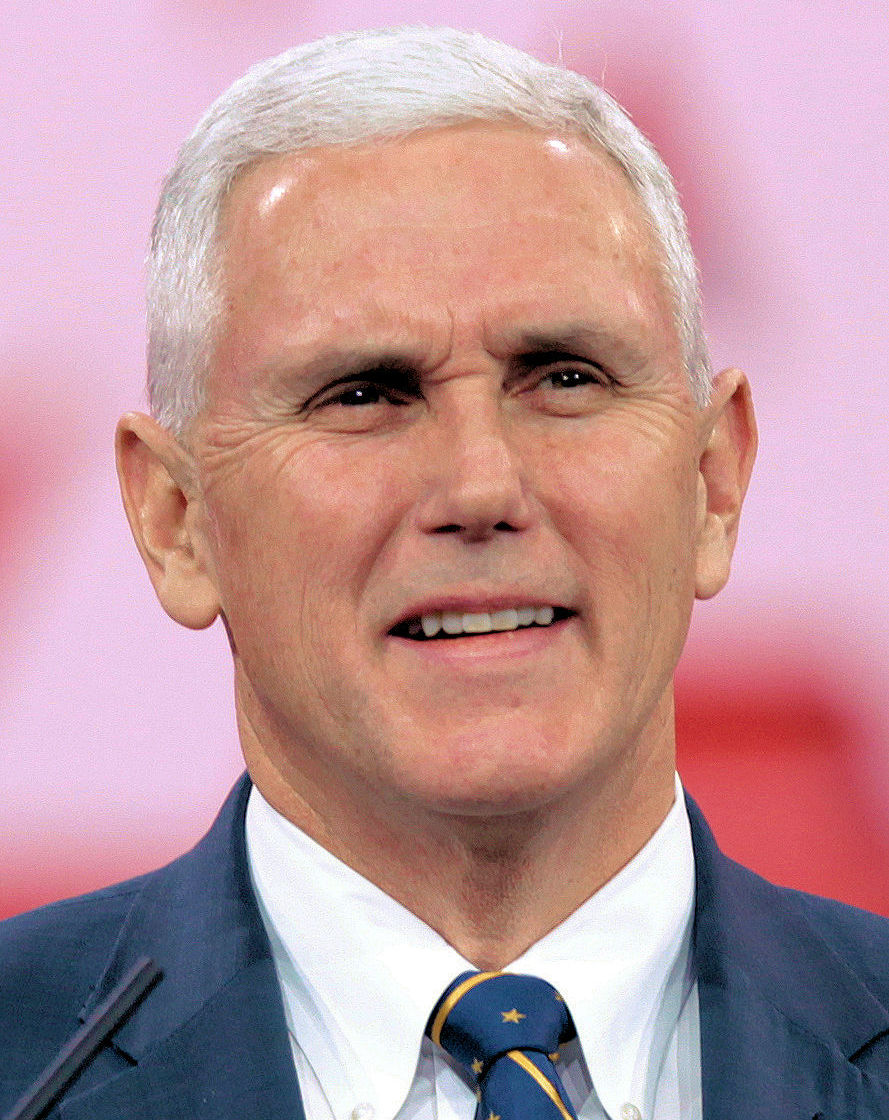
Governor Mike Pence

Democratic Party ticket

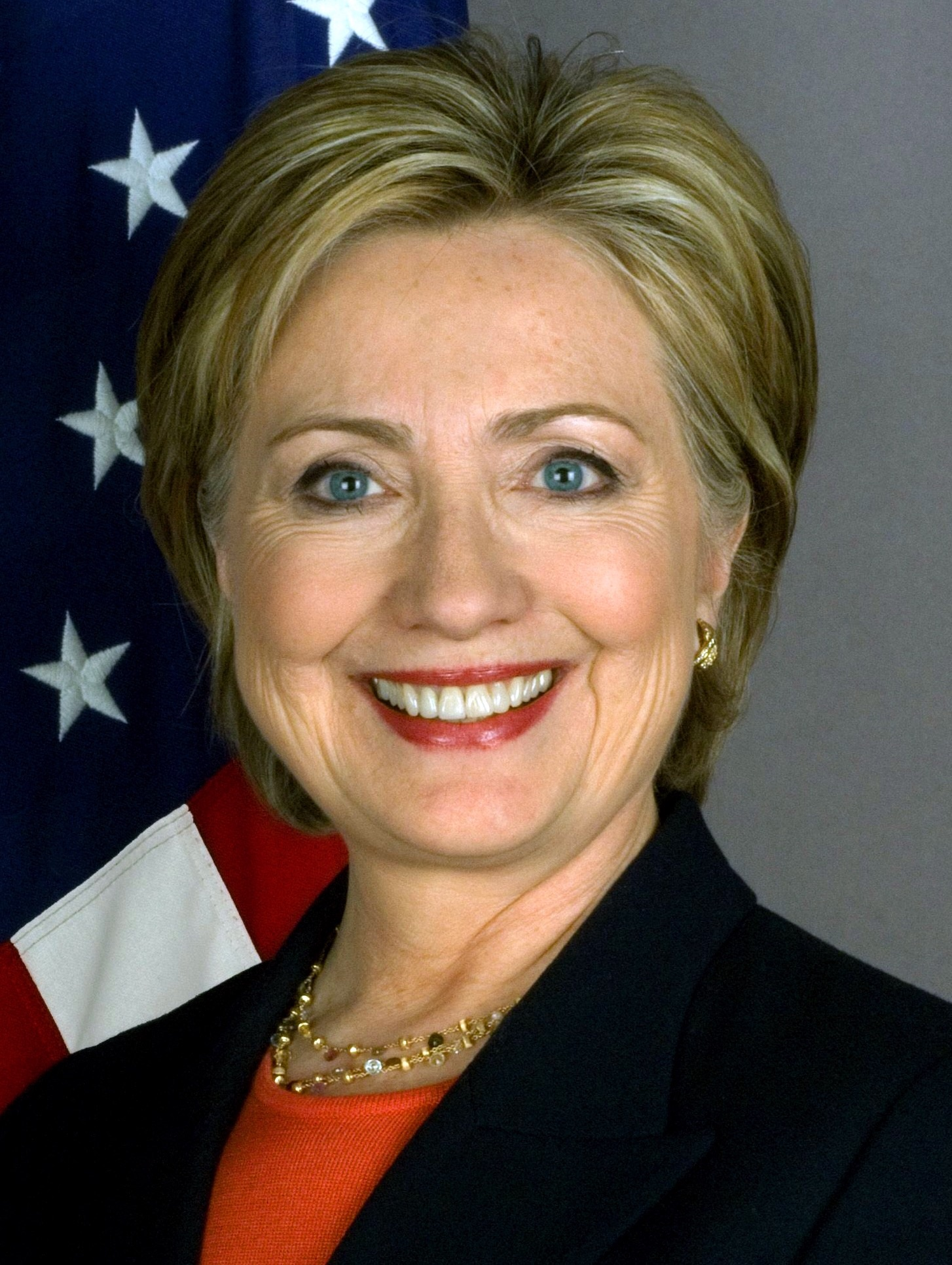
Former Secretary of State Hillary Clinton

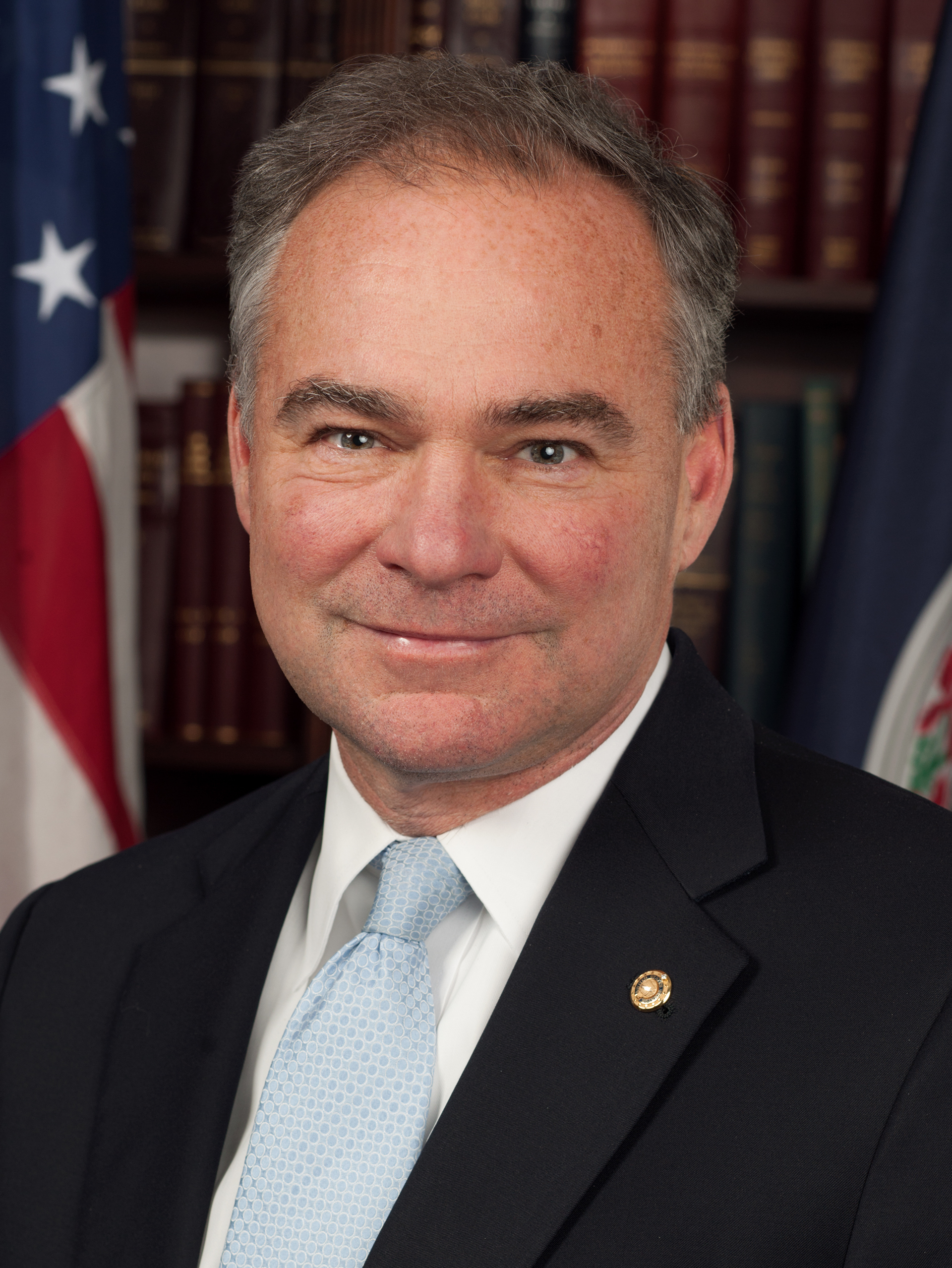
Senator Tim Kaine

== 2014 ==
=== November 2014 ===
- November 20 – Jim Webb, former US Senator from Virginia, forms an exploratory committee for a possible run for president

=== December 2014 ===
- December 16 – Former Florida Governor Jeb Bush announces the formation of a political action committee (PAC) for a possible run for president

== 2015 ==
=== January 2015 ===
- January 26 – Chris Christie, Governor of New Jersey, forms a PAC in preparation for a possible run for president
- January 27 – Martin O'Malley, former Governor of Maryland, forms a PAC in preparation for a possible run for president
- January 29 – Lindsey Graham, United States Senator from South Carolina, forms an exploratory committee in preparation for a possible run for president
- January 30 – Mitt Romney, former Governor of Massachusetts and 2012 Republican presidential nominee, declines to run in the 2016 election after considering it

=== February 2015 ===
- February 9 – George Pataki, former Governor of New York, forms a PAC in preparation for a possible run for president

=== March 2015 ===
- March 2 – Ben Carson, a retired neurosurgeon, forms an exploratory committee in preparation for a possible run for president
- March 5 – Mark Everson, former Commissioner of Internal Revenue, formally announces his candidacy for the presidential nomination of the Republican Party
- March 18 – Donald Trump, CEO of The Trump Organization since 1971, forms an exploratory committee in preparation for a possible run for president on the Republican Party ticket
- March 23 – U.S. Senator Ted Cruz, of Texas, formally announces his candidacy for the presidential nomination of the Republican Party

=== April 2015 ===
- April 7 – U.S. Senator Rand Paul, of Kentucky, officially declares his candidacy for the presidential nomination of the Republican Party
- April 9
  - Former Rhode Island Governor Lincoln Chafee announces the formation of an exploratory committee for a possible run for president
  - Former U.S. Senator Rick Santorum of Pennsylvania forms a "testing the waters" account for a possible run for president
- April 12 – Former Secretary of State Hillary Clinton formally announces her candidacy for the presidential nomination of the Democratic Party
- April 13 – U.S. Senator Marco Rubio, of Florida, officially declares his candidacy for the presidential nomination of the Republican Party
- April 30 – U.S. Senator Bernie Sanders, of Vermont, formally announces his candidacy for the presidential nomination of the Democratic Party

=== May 2015 ===
- May 4
  - Former business executive Carly Fiorina, of California officially declares her candidacy for the presidential nomination of the Republican Party
  - Neurosurgeon Ben Carson, of Maryland, formally announces his candidacy for the presidential nomination of the Republican Party
- May 5 – Former Governor of Arkansas Mike Huckabee officially declares his candidacy for the presidential nomination of the Republican Party
- May 27 – Former U.S. Senator Rick Santorum, of Pennsylvania, formally announces his candidacy for the presidential nomination of the Republican Party
- May 28 – Former Governor of New York George Pataki officially declares his candidacy for the presidential nomination of the Republican Party
- May 30 – Former Governor of Maryland Martin O'Malley formally announces his candidacy for the presidential nomination of the Democratic Party
- May 31 – US Senator Elizabeth Warren of Massachusetts confirms she will not be running for president

=== June 2015 ===
- June 1 – U.S. Senator Lindsey Graham, of South Carolina, officially declares his candidacy for the presidential nomination of the Republican Party
- June 3 – Former Governor of Rhode Island Lincoln Chafee formally announces his candidacy for the presidential nomination of the Democratic Party
- June 4 – Former Governor of Texas Rick Perry officially declares his candidacy for the presidential nomination of the Republican Party
- June 15 – Former Governor of Florida Jeb Bush formally announces his candidacy for the presidential nomination of the Republican Party
- June 16 – Business magnate Donald Trump, of New York, officially declares his candidacy for the presidential nomination of the Republican Party
- June 22 – Massachusetts physician Jill Stein officially declares her candidacy for the presidential nomination of the Green Party
- June 24 – Governor of Louisiana Bobby Jindal formally announces his candidacy for the presidential nomination of the Republican Party
- June 30 – Governor of New Jersey Chris Christie officially declares his candidacy for the presidential nomination of the Republican Party

=== July 2015 ===
- July 2 – Former U.S. Senator Jim Webb, of Virginia, formally announces his candidacy for the presidential nomination of the Democratic Party
- July 13 – Governor of Wisconsin Scott Walker formally announces his candidacy for the presidential nomination of the Republican Party
- July 21 – Governor of Ohio John Kasich officially announces his candidacy for the presidential nomination of the Republican Party
- July 30 – Former Governor of Virginia Jim Gilmore formally announces his candidacy for the presidential nomination of the Republican Party

=== August 2015 ===
- August 3 – First presidential forum, featuring 14 Republican candidates, was broadcast on C-SPAN from the New Hampshire Institute of Politics in Goffstown, New Hampshire
- August 4 – Fox News announced which 10 candidates were invited to the first official Republican debate
- August 6 – First official presidential debate, featuring 10 Republican candidates, is held in Cleveland, Ohio Fox News includes the other seven Republican candidates in a separate debate held earlier on the same day
- August 11 – Lawrence Lessig forms an exploratory committee for a possible run for president, stating that if he raised $1 million by Labor Day he would run
- August 16 – Andy Martin formally announces his candidacy for the presidential nomination of the Republican Party
- August 22 – Jimmy McMillan formally announces his candidacy for the presidential nomination of the Republican Party

=== September 2015 ===
- September 6 – Lawrence Lessig, Harvard University law professor, formally announces his candidacy for the Democratic presidential nomination
- September 8 – John McAfee, antivirus software developer, formally announces his candidacy for president under the banner of the newly formed Cyber Party
- September 11 – Rick Perry formally withdraws his candidacy for the Republican presidential nomination
- September 16 – Second Republican debate is held in Simi Valley, California
- September 21 – Scott Walker formally withdraws his candidacy for the Republican presidential nomination
- September 30 – South Carolina finalizes ballot for primary; 15 Republican candidates qualify

=== October 2015 ===
- October 13 – First Democratic debate is held in Las Vegas, Nevada at the Wynn Casino
- October 16 – Lawrence Lessig announces he is dropping his much-derided promise to resign after passing his signature legislation. He stated he would to serve a full term as president and would flesh out his policy agenda accordingly
- October 20 – Jim Webb formally withdraws his candidacy for the Democratic presidential nomination
- October 21 – Vice President Joe Biden announces that he will not run for president in 2016
- October 23 – Lincoln Chafee formally withdraws his candidacy for the Democratic presidential nomination
- October 28 – Third Republican debate is held in Boulder, Colorado at the University of Colorado

=== November 2015 ===
- November 2 – Lawrence Lessig formally withdraws his candidacy for the Democratic presidential nomination
- November 4–20 – Candidate registration for New Hampshire primary
- November 5 – Mark Everson formally withdraws his candidacy for the Republican presidential nomination
- November 6
  - Deadline for filing for the Alabama primary
  - First in the South Democratic Forum featuring Martin O'Malley, Bernie Sanders, and Hillary Clinton is broadcast on MSNBC from Winthrop University in Rock Hill, South Carolina
- November 9 – Deadline for filing for the Arkansas primary
- November 10 – Fourth Republican debate is held in Milwaukee, Wisconsin
- November 13–14 – Republican Party of Florida's Sunshine Summit event is held in Orlando, Florida
- November 14 – Second Democratic debate is held in Des Moines, Iowa
- November 17 – Bobby Jindal formally withdraws his candidacy for the Republican presidential nomination
- November 20 – The Presidential Family Forum is held in Des Moines, Iowa
- November 24 – MoveOn.org Democratic forum featuring Martin O'Malley and Bernie Sanders

=== December 2015 ===
- December 3 – The Republican Jewish Coalition Presidential Candidates Forum is held in Washington, D.C.
- December 9 – Jimmy McMillan formally withdraws his candidacy for the Republican presidential nomination
- December 15 – Fifth Republican debate is held in Las Vegas, Nevada
- December 19 – Third Democratic debate is held in Manchester, New Hampshire
- December 21 – Lindsey Graham formally withdraws his candidacy for the Republican presidential nomination
- December 24 – John McAfee, antivirus software developer, formally announces his candidacy for the Libertarian presidential nomination
- December 29 – George Pataki formally withdraws his candidacy for the Republican presidential nomination

== 2016 ==
=== January 2016 ===
- January 6 – Former Governor of New Mexico Gary Johnson formally announces his candidacy for the presidential nomination of the Libertarian Party
- January 9 – The Republicans' Kemp Forum is held in Columbia, South Carolina
- January 11 – Third Democratic forum is held in Des Moines, Iowa
- January 14 – The sixth Republican debate is held in North Charleston, South Carolina
- January 17 – The fourth Democratic debate is held in Charleston, South Carolina
- January 25 – A Democratic forum, a town hall event, is held in Des Moines, Iowa
- January 28 – Seventh Republican debate is held in Des Moines, Iowa

=== February 2016 ===
- February 1
  - The Iowa Democratic caucus is won by Hillary Clinton
  - The Iowa Republican caucus is won by Ted Cruz
  - Martin O'Malley formally withdraws his candidacy for the Democratic presidential nomination
  - Mike Huckabee formally withdraws his candidacy for the Republican presidential nomination
- February 3
  - Rand Paul formally withdraws his candidacy for the Republican presidential nomination
  - Rick Santorum formally withdraws his candidacy for the Republican presidential nomination
  - A Democratic Town Hall forum event is held in Derry, New Hampshire
- February 4 – Fifth Democratic debate is held in Durham, New Hampshire
- February 6 – Eighth Republican debate is held in Manchester, New Hampshire
- February 9
  - The New Hampshire Republican primary is won by Donald Trump
  - The New Hampshire Democratic primary is won by Bernie Sanders
- February 10
  - Chris Christie formally withdraws his candidacy for the Republican presidential nomination
  - Carly Fiorina formally withdraws her candidacy for the Republican presidential nomination
- February 11 – Sixth Democratic debate is held in Milwaukee, Wisconsin
- February 12 – Jim Gilmore formally withdraws his candidacy for the Republican presidential nomination
- February 13 – Ninth Republican debate is held in Charleston, South Carolina
- February 17–18 – CNN Republican town halls are held in Greenville, South Carolina and Columbia, South Carolina
- February 18 – Democratic Town Hall forum event is held in Las Vegas, Nevada
- February 20
  - Nevada Democratic caucuses are won by Hillary Clinton
  - South Carolina Republican primary is won by Donald Trump
  - Jeb Bush formally withdraws his candidacy for the Republican presidential nomination
- February 23
  - Nevada Republican caucuses are won by Donald Trump
  - CNN Democratic town hall is held in Columbia, South Carolina
- February 24 – Republican town hall is held in Houston, Texas
- February 25 – 10th Republican debate is held in Houston, Texas
- February 27 – South Carolina Democratic primary is won by Hillary Clinton

=== March 2016 ===
- March 1 – Super Tuesday
  - Democratic primaries/caucuses:
    - Alabama Democratic primary won by Hillary Clinton
    - Arkansas Democratic primary won by Hillary Clinton
    - Colorado Democratic caucus won by Bernie Sanders
    - Georgia Democratic primary won by Hillary Clinton
    - Massachusetts Democratic primary won by Hillary Clinton
    - Minnesota Democratic caucus won by Bernie Sanders
    - Oklahoma Democratic primary won by Bernie Sanders
    - Tennessee Democratic primary won by Hillary Clinton
    - Texas Democratic primary won by Hillary Clinton
    - Vermont Democratic primary won by Bernie Sanders
    - Virginia Democratic primary won by Hillary Clinton
  - Republican primaries/caucuses:
    - Alabama Republican primary won by Donald Trump
    - Alaska Republican caucus won by Ted Cruz
    - Arkansas Republican primary won by Donald Trump
    - Georgia Republican primary won by Donald Trump
    - Massachusetts Republican primary won by Donald Trump
    - Minnesota Republican caucus won by Marco Rubio
    - Oklahoma Republican primary won by Ted Cruz
    - Tennessee Republican primary won by Donald Trump
    - Texas Republican primary won by Ted Cruz
    - Vermont Republican primary won by Donald Trump
    - Virginia Republican primary won by Donald Trump
- March 3 – Eleventh Republican debate is held in Detroit, Michigan
- March 4 – Ben Carson formally withdraws his candidacy for the Republican presidential nomination
- March 5
  - Democratic primaries/caucuses:
    - Kansas Democratic caucus won by Bernie Sanders
    - Louisiana Democratic primary won by Hillary Clinton
    - Nebraska Democratic caucus won by Bernie Sanders
  - Republican primaries/caucuses:
    - Kansas Republican caucus won by Ted Cruz
    - Kentucky Republican caucus won by Donald Trump
    - Louisiana Republican primary won by Donald Trump
    - Maine Republican caucus won by Ted Cruz
- March 6
  - Maine Democratic caucus won by Bernie Sanders
  - Puerto Rico Republican primary won by Marco Rubio
  - Seventh Democratic debate is held in Flint, Michigan
- March 8
  - Democratic primaries/caucuses:
    - Michigan Democratic primary won by Bernie Sanders
    - Mississippi Democratic primary won by Hillary Clinton
  - Republican primaries/caucuses:
    - Michigan Republican primary won by Donald Trump
    - Mississippi Republican primary won by Donald Trump
    - Hawaii Republican caucus won by Donald Trump
    - Idaho Republican primary won by Ted Cruz
- March 9 – Eighth and final Democratic debate is held in Miami, Florida
- March 10
  - Twelfth Republican debate is held in Miami, Florida
  - Virgin Islands Republican caucus won by Ted Cruz
- March 12
  - Democratic primaries/caucuses:
    - Northern Marianas Democratic caucus won by Hillary Clinton
  - Republican primaries/caucuses:
    - Washington D.C. Republican caucus won by Marco Rubio
    - Wyoming Republicans' county conventions are won by Ted Cruz
    - Guam Republican caucus is held. Ted Cruz is awarded one delegate. The remaining eight delegates are uncommitted, pending a future meeting
- March 15
  - Democratic primaries/caucuses:
    - Florida Democratic primary won by Hillary Clinton
    - Illinois Democratic primary won by Hillary Clinton
    - Missouri Democratic primary won by Hillary Clinton
    - North Carolina Democratic primary won by Hillary Clinton
    - Ohio Democratic primary won by Hillary Clinton
  - Republican primaries/caucuses:
    - Florida Republican primary won by Donald Trump
    - Illinois Republican primary won by Donald Trump
    - Missouri Republican primary won by Donald Trump
    - North Carolina Republican primary won by Donald Trump
    - Ohio Republican primary won by John Kasich
    - Northern Marianas Republican caucus won by Donald Trump
  - Marco Rubio formally withdraws his candidacy for the Republican presidential nomination
- March 21
  - Democrats Abroad primary won by Bernie Sanders
- March 22
  - Democratic primaries/caucuses:
    - Arizona Democratic primary won by Hillary Clinton
    - Idaho Democratic caucus won by Bernie Sanders
    - Utah Democratic caucus won by Bernie Sanders
  - Republican primaries/caucuses:
    - Arizona Republican primary won by Donald Trump
    - Utah Republican caucus won by Ted Cruz
    - American Samoa Republican caucus is held; Ted Cruz and Donald Trump respectively secure one delegate each, majority of delegates remain uncommitted.
- March 26
  - Democratic caucuses:
    - Washington Democratic caucus won by Bernie Sanders
    - Alaska Democratic caucus won by Bernie Sanders
    - Hawaii Democratic caucus won by Bernie Sanders
- March 29 – Republican town hall

=== April 2016 ===
- April 1 – First ever nationally televised Libertarian presidential debate hosted by John Stossel airs on Fox Business Network (Part 1)
- April 2 – Delegate count at the North Dakota Republican State Convention is won by Ted Cruz
- April 5
  - Wisconsin Democratic primary won by Bernie Sanders
  - Wisconsin Republican primary won by Ted Cruz
- April 8 – Part 2 of first ever nationally televised Libertarian presidential debate hosted by John Stossel airs on Fox Business Network
- April 9 – Delegate count of the Colorado Republican convention is won by Ted Cruz
- April 9 – Wyoming Democratic caucus won by Bernie Sanders
- April 14 – Ninth Democratic debate is held in Brooklyn, New York
- April 19
  - New York Democratic primary won by Hillary Clinton
  - New York Republican primary won by Donald Trump
- April 26
  - Democratic primaries/caucuses:
    - Connecticut Democratic primary won by Hillary Clinton
    - Delaware Democratic primary won by Hillary Clinton
    - Maryland Democratic primary won by Hillary Clinton
    - Pennsylvania Democratic primary won by Hillary Clinton
    - Rhode Island Democratic primary won by Bernie Sanders
  - Republican primaries/caucuses:
    - Connecticut Republican primary won by Donald Trump
    - Delaware Republican primary won by Donald Trump
    - Maryland Republican primary won by Donald Trump
    - Pennsylvania Republican primary won by Donald Trump
    - Rhode Island Republican primary won by Donald Trump

=== May 2016 ===
- May 3
  - Indiana Democratic primary won by Bernie Sanders
  - Indiana Republican primary won by Donald Trump
  - Ted Cruz formally withdraws his candidacy for the Republican presidential nomination
- May 4 – John Kasich formally withdraws his candidacy for the Republican presidential nomination
- May 7 – Guam Democratic caucuses won by Hillary Clinton
- May 10
  - Democratic primaries/caucuses:
    - West Virginia Democratic primary won by Bernie Sanders
  - Republican primaries/caucuses:
    - West Virginia Republican primary won by Donald Trump
    - Nebraska Republican primary won by Donald Trump
- May 12 – Second nationally televised Libertarian presidential debate airs on RT America.
- May 17
  - Democratic primaries/caucuses:
    - Kentucky Democratic primary won by Hillary Clinton
    - Oregon Democratic primary won by Bernie Sanders
  - Republican primaries/caucuses:
    - Oregon Republican primary won by Donald Trump
  - Gary Johnson announces he has chosen former Massachusetts governor William Weld as his vice presidential running mate
- May 20 – Third nationally televised Libertarian presidential debate airs on TheBlaze.
- May 24 – Washington Republican primary won by Donald Trump
- May 26–30 – The Libertarian National Convention is held in Orlando, Florida. Gary Johnson is chosen as the party's presidential nominee and William Weld is chosen as the party's vice presidential nominee
- May 26 – Donald Trump officially passes 1,237 pledged delegates, the minimum amount of delegates required to secure the 2016 Republican presidential nomination

=== June 2016 ===
- June 4 – Virgin Islands Democratic caucuses won by Hillary Clinton
- June 5 – Puerto Rico Democratic caucuses won by Hillary Clinton
- June 6 – Former secretary of state Hillary Clinton officially passes 2,383 pledged delegates, the minimum amount of delegates required to secure the 2016 Democratic presidential nomination.
- June 7
  - Democratic primaries/caucuses
    - California Democratic primary won by Hillary Clinton
    - Montana Democratic primary won by Bernie Sanders
    - New Jersey Democratic primary won by Hillary Clinton
    - New Mexico Democratic primary won by Hillary Clinton
    - North Dakota Democratic caucus won by Bernie Sanders
    - South Dakota Democratic primary won by Hillary Clinton
  - Republican primaries/caucuses
    - California Republican primary won by Donald Trump
    - Montana Republican primary won by Donald Trump
    - New Jersey Republican primary won by Donald Trump
    - New Mexico Republican primary won by Donald Trump
    - South Dakota Republican primary won by Donald Trump
- June 9
  - President Barack Obama officially endorses Hillary Clinton
  - At Trump Tower, Donald Trump Jr., Paul Manafort, and Jared Kushner meet with a Russian lawyer who has promised to provide material embarrassing to Hillary Clinton.
- June 14 – Washington, D.C. Democratic primary won by Hillary Clinton
- June 15 – Jill Stein reaches the necessary number of delegates for the Green nomination and becomes presumptive nominee
- June 22 – Libertarian presidential town hall hosted and aired by CNN

=== July 2016 ===
- July 12 – Bernie Sanders endorses Hillary Clinton
- July 15 – Republican presumptive nominee Donald Trump announces Indiana governor Mike Pence as his vice presidential running mate
- July 18–21 – Republican National Convention is held in Cleveland, Ohio. Donald Trump and Mike Pence are formally nominated for President and Vice President, respectively, by the party's state delegations
  - July 21 – Donald Trump formally accepts the nomination from the Republican Party
- July 22 – Democratic presumptive nominee Hillary Clinton announces United States Senator and former Virginian governor Tim Kaine as her vice presidential running mate
- July 23 – Wikileaks leaks 20,000 emails from the Democratic National Committee, revealing a systematic bias against Bernie Sanders from the Democratic Party leadership, leading to the resignation of DNC chair Debbie Wasserman Schultz
- July 25–28 – Democratic National Convention is held in Philadelphia, Pennsylvania. Hillary Clinton and Tim Kaine are formally nominated for President and Vice President, respectively, by the party's state delegations
  - July 28 – Hillary Clinton formally accepts the nomination from the Democratic Party, becoming the first female presidential nominee of a major party in U.S. history.

=== August 2016 ===
- August 1 – Green Party presumptive nominee Jill Stein announces Human rights activist Ajamu Baraka as her vice presidential running mate
- August 4–7 – Green National Convention is held in Houston, Texas. Jill Stein is chosen as the party's presidential nominee and Ajamu Baraka is chosen as the party's vice presidential nominee
- August 8 – Former chief policy director for the House Republican Conference and former CIA operations officer Evan McMullin formally announces his presidential candidacy as an independent

=== September 2016 ===
- September 7 – Arrest warrants are issued for Green Party presidential candidate Jill Stein and running mate Ajamu Baraka for trespass and vandalism during a North Dakota protest.
- September 8 – Libertarian Party nominee Gary Johnson makes his infamous "What is Aleppo" gaffe during an interview on MSNBC's Morning Joe.
- September 26 – First presidential general election debate between the two major candidates was held at Hofstra University in Hempstead, New York. (The first debate was originally going to be held at Wright State University, but the location was changed due to rising security costs that were being incurred by the school.) Hillary Clinton ends up taking the majority support after the debate.

=== October 2016 ===
- October 4 – Only vice presidential general election debate was held at Longwood University in Farmville, Virginia. Mike Pence (Trump's running mate) ends up narrowly winning favor over Tim Kaine (Clinton's running mate).
- October 7
  - Tapes are leaked out from Access Hollywood showing Donald Trump and Billy Bush bragging about sexual exploits in 2005.
  - WikiLeaks begins publishing thousands of emails from the personal Gmail account of Clinton campaign manager John Podesta, revealing excerpts from Clinton's paid speeches to Wall Street.
- October 9 – Second presidential general election debate was held at Washington University in St. Louis in St. Louis, Missouri. Hillary Clinton ends up narrowly winning over Donald Trump.
- October 19 – The third and final presidential debate between the two major candidates was held at the University of Nevada, Las Vegas in Paradise, Nevada Hillary Clinton ends up winning with a very close margin over Donald Trump.
- October 25 – The Free & Equal Election Foundation debate was held at the University of Colorado in Boulder, Colorado, allowing all candidates with major ballot access to participate. Gary Johnson publicly declined the offer.
- October 28 – James Comey announces that the FBI will be investigating newly discovered emails pertinent to its previous investigation of Hillary Clinton's private server. Hillary's lead in the polls drops heavily within days.
- October 31 – PBS airs the first part of a presidential forum with major third-party candidates Gary Johnson and Jill Stein, moderated by Tavis Smiley.

=== November 2016 ===
- November 6 – James Comey tells Congress there is no evidence in the recently discovered emails that Clinton should face charges over handling of classified information
- November 8 – US Election Day.
  - A shooting at a residential area near a polling place in Azusa, California, leaves one dead and three injured and some polling places in the city locked down.
  - Pre-6 p.m
    - 12:30 a.m: Polls close in Dixville Notch, New Hampshire. The vote is 4 for Clinton, 2 for Trump.
    - Approximately 1:30 a.m: In the Guam straw poll, which has historically predicted the election winner, Clinton defeats Trump by approximately three to one.
  - 6 a.m. to 12 p.m: Polls open throughout the country, with the last being Hawaii, which opens up 12 p.m. EST (7 a.m. AHST).
    - 8 a.m: Hillary Clinton votes in Chappaqua, New York.
  - 11 a.m: Donald Trump votes in New York City.
  - 6 p.m
    - The Eastern Time zone sections of Indiana and Kentucky close their polls.
  - 7 p.m
    - The Eastern Time zone of Florida close their polls.
    - Georgia, South Carolina, Virginia, Vermont, and most places in New Hampshire close their polls.
  - 7:30 p.m
    - Ohio, West Virginia, and North Carolina close their polls.
  - 8 p.m
    - The latest time to close the polls in New Hampshire.
    - The Eastern Time zone of Michigan close their polls.
    - The Central Time zone of Florida, Texas, Kansas, South Dakota, and North Dakota close their polls.
    - Oklahoma, Missouri, Illinois, Tennessee, Mississippi, Alabama, Pennsylvania, Maryland, District of Columbia, Delaware, New Jersey, Connecticut, Rhode Island, Massachusetts, and Maine close their polls.
  - 8:30 p.m
    - Arkansas closes their polls.
  - 9 p.m
    - The Central Time zone of Michigan close their polls.
    - The Mountain Time zones of Texas, Kansas, South Dakota, and North Dakota close their polls.
    - Arizona, Colorado, Louisiana, Minnesota, Nebraska, New Mexico, New York, Wisconsin, and Wyoming close their polls.
  - 10 p.m
    - The Mountain Time zones of Oregon and Idaho close their polls.
    - Nevada, Utah, Montana, Iowa close their polls.
  - 11 p.m
    - The Pacific Time zones of Oregon and Idaho close their polls.
    - California, Hawaii, and Washington close their polls.
- November 9
  - 12 a.m
    - Alaska closes its polls.
  - 2:45 a.m. Eastern time
    - Donald Trump is the projected winner of the election, becoming president-elect.
  - Morningtime
    - The 2016 Portland, Oregon riots begin
    - The 2016 Oakland riots begin
    - Protests begin in numerous other cities
- November 23 – Jill Stein starts fundraising for a recount effort in Michigan, Pennsylvania, and Wisconsin.

=== December 2016 ===
- December 19 – The electors of the Electoral College meet in their respective capitals and formally cast their ballots. Trump receives 304 electoral votes, Clinton receives 227. Seven faithless electors cast their votes for other candidates.

== 2017 ==
=== January 2017 ===
- January 6 – Electoral votes formally counted before a joint session of Congress; the President of the Senate Joe Biden formally announces the electoral result.
- January 20 – Inauguration of Donald Trump as the 45th president of the United States and Mike Pence as the 48th vice president.

== Election results by state ==
Legend
States won by Clinton/Kaine
States won by Trump/Pence
EV	Electoral votes
†	At-large results (for states that split electoral votes)

State or district	Hillary Clinton Democratic			Donald Trump Republican			Gary Johnson Libertarian			Jill Stein Green			Evan McMullin Independent			Others			Margin		Total votes	Sources
State or district	Votes	%	EV	Votes	%	EV	Votes	%	EV	Votes	%	EV	Votes	%	EV	Votes	%	EV	Votes	%	Total votes	Sources
Ala.	729,547	34.36%	–	1,318,255	62.08%	9	44,467	2.09%	–	9,391	0.44%	–	–	–	–	21,712	1.02%	–	588,708	27.73%	2,123,372	
Alaska	116,454	36.55%	–	163,387	51.28%	3	18,725	5.88%	–	5,735	1.80%	–	–	–	–	14,307	4.49%	–	46,933	14.73%	318,608	
Ariz.	1,161,167	45.13%	–	1,252,401	48.67%	11	106,327	4.13%	–	34,345	1.33%	–	17,449	0.68%	–	1,476	0.06%	–	91,234	3.55%	2,573,165	
Ark.	380,494	33.65%	–	684,872	60.57%	6	29,829	2.64%	–	9,473	0.84%	–	13,255	1.17%	–	12,712	1.12%	–	304,378	26.92%	1,130,635	
Calif.	8,753,788	61.73%	55	4,483,810	31.62%	–	478,500	3.37%	–	278,657	1.96%	–	39,596	0.28%	–	147,244	1.04%	–	−4,269,978	−30.11%	14,181,595	
Colo.	1,338,870	48.16%	9	1,202,484	43.25%	–	144,121	5.18%	–	38,437	1.38%	–	28,917	1.04%	–	27,418	0.99%	–	−136,386	−4.91%	2,780,247	
Conn.	897,572	54.57%	7	673,215	40.93%	–	48,676	2.96%	–	22,841	1.39%	–	2,108	0.13%	–	508	0.03%	–	−224,357	−13.64%	1,644,920	
Del.	235,603	53.09%	3	185,127	41.72%	–	14,757	3.32%	–	6,103	1.37%	–	706	0.16%	–	1,518	0.34%	–	−50,476	−11.37%	443,814	
D.C.	282,830	90.48%	3	12,723	4.07%	–	4,906	1.57%	–	4,258	1.36%	–	–	–	–	6,551	2.52%	–	−270,107	−86.78%	311,268	
Fla.	4,504,975	47.82%	–	4,617,886	49.02%	29	207,043	2.20%	–	64,399	0.68%	–	–	–	–	25,736	0.28%	–	112,911	1.20%	9,420,039	
Ga.	1,877,963	45.64%	–	2,089,104	50.77%	16	125,306	3.05%	–	7,674	0.19%	–	13,017	0.32%	–	1,668	0.04%	–	211,141	5.13%	4,114,732	
Hawaii	266,891	62.22%	3	128,847	30.03%	–	15,954	3.72%	–	12,737	2.97%	–	–	–	–	4,508	1.05%	1	−138,044	−32.18%	428,937	
Idaho	189,765	27.49%	–	409,055	59.26%	4	28,331	4.10%	–	8,496	1.23%	–	46,476	6.73%	–	8,132	1.18%	–	219,290	31.77%	690,255	
Ill.	3,090,729	55.83%	20	2,146,015	38.76%	–	209,596	3.79%	–	76,802	1.39%	–	11,655	0.21%	–	1,627	0.03%	–	−944,714	−17.06%	5,536,424	
Ind.	1,033,126	37.91%	–	1,557,286	56.82%	11	133,993	4.89%	–	7,841	0.27%	–	–	–	–	2,712	0.10%	–	524,160	19.17%	2,734,958	
Iowa	653,669	41.74%	–	800,983	51.15%	6	59,186	3.78%	–	11,479	0.73%	–	12,366	0.79%	–	28,348	1.81%	–	147,314	9.41%	1,566,031	
Kan.	427,005	36.05%	–	671,018	56.65%	6	55,406	4.68%	–	23,506	1.98%	–	6,520	0.55%	–	947	0.08%	–	244,013	20.60%	1,184,402	
Ky.	628,854	32.68%	–	1,202,971	62.52%	8	53,752	2.79%	–	13,913	0.72%	–	22,780	1.18%	–	1,879	0.10%	–	574,177	29.84%	1,924,149	
La.	780,154	38.45%	–	1,178,638	58.09%	8	37,978	1.87%	–	14,031	0.69%	–	8,547	0.42%	–	9,684	0.48%	–	398,484	19.64%	2,029,032	
Maine †	357,735	47.83%	2	335,593	44.87%	–	38,105	5.09%	–	14,251	1.91%	–	1,887	0.25%	–	356	0.05%	–	−22,142	−2.96%	747,927	
ME-1	212,774	53.96%	1	154,384	39.15%	–	18,592	4.71%	–	7,563	1.92%	–	807	0.20%	–	209	0.05%	–	−58,390	−14.81%	394,329	
ME-2	144,817	40.98%	–	181,177	51.26%	1	19,510	5.52%	–	6,685	1.89%	–	1,080	0.31%	–	147	0.04%	–	36,360	10.29%	353,416	
Md.	1,677,928	60.33%	10	943,169	33.91%	–	79,605	2.86%	–	35,945	1.29%	–	9,630	0.35%	–	35,169	1.26%	–	−734,759	−26.42%	2,781,446	
Mass.	1,995,196	60.01%	11	1,090,893	32.81%	–	138,018	4.15%	–	47,661	1.43%	–	2,719	0.08%	–	50,559	1.52%	–	−904,303	−27.20%	3,325,046	
Mich.	2,268,839	47.27%	–	2,279,543	47.50%	16	172,136	3.59%	–	51,463	1.07%	–	8,177	0.17%	–	19,126	0.40%	–	10,704	0.23%	4,799,284	
Minn.	1,367,716	46.44%	10	1,322,951	44.92%	–	112,972	3.84%	–	36,985	1.26%	–	53,076	1.80%	–	51,113	1.74%	–	−44,765	−1.52%	2,944,813	
Miss.	485,131	40.11%	–	700,714	57.94%	6	14,435	1.19%	–	3,731	0.31%	–	–	–	–	5,346	0.44%	–	215,583	17.83%	1,209,357	
Mo.	1,071,068	38.14%	–	1,594,511	56.77%	10	97,359	3.47%	–	25,419	0.91%	–	7,071	0.25%	–	13,177	0.47%	–	523,443	18.64%	2,808,605	
Mont.	177,709	35.75%	–	279,240	56.17%	3	28,037	5.64%	–	7,970	1.60%	–	2,297	0.46%	–	1,894	0.38%	–	101,531	20.42%	497,147	
Nebr. †	284,494	33.70%	–	495,961	58.75%	2	38,946	4.61%	–	8,775	1.04%	–	–	–	–	16,051	1.90%	–	211,467	25.05%	844,227	
NE-1	100,126	35.46%	–	158,626	56.18%	1	14,031	4.97%	–	3,374	1.19%	–	–	–	–	6,181	2.19%	–	58,500	20.72%	282,338	
NE-2	131,030	44.92%	–	137,564	47.16%	1	13,245	4.54%	–	3,347	1.15%	–	–	–	–	6,494	2.23%	–	6,534	2.24%	291,680	
NE-3	53,290	19.73%	–	199,657	73.92%	1	11,657	4.32%	–	2,054	0.76%	–	–	–	–	3,451	1.28%	–	146,367	54.19%	270,109	
Nev.	539,260	47.50%	6	512,058	45.98%	–	37,384	3.29%	–	–	–	–	–	–	–	36,683	3.23%	–	−27,202	−2.42%	1,125,385	
N.H.	348,526	46.98%	4	345,790	46.61%	–	30,777	4.15%	–	6,496	0.88%	–	1,064	0.14%	–	11,643	1.24%	–	−2,736	−0.37%	744,296	
N.J.	2,148,278	55.45%	14	1,601,933	41.35%	–	72,477	1.87%	–	37,772	0.98%	–	–	–	–	13,586	0.35%	–	−546,345	−14.10%	3,874,046	
N.M.	385,234	48.26%	5	319,667	40.04%	–	74,541	9.34%	–	9,879	1.24%	–	5,825	0.73%	–	3,173	0.40%	–	−65,567	−8.21%	798,319	
N.Y.	4,556,124	59.01%	29	2,819,534	36.52%	–	176,598	2.29%	–	107,934	1.40%	–	10,373	0.13%	–	50,890	0.66%	–	−1,736,590	−22.49%	7,721,453	
N.C.	2,189,316	46.17%	–	2,362,631	49.83%	15	130,126	2.74%	–	12,105	0.26%	–	–	–	–	47,386	1.00%	–	173,315	3.66%	4,741,564	
N.D.	93,758	27.23%	–	216,794	62.96%	3	21,434	6.22%	–	3,780	1.10%	–	–	–	–	8,594	2.49%	–	123,036	35.73%	344,360	
Ohio	2,394,164	43.56%	–	2,841,005	51.69%	18	174,498	3.17%	–	46,271	0.84%	–	12,574	0.23%	–	27,975	0.51%	–	446,841	8.13%	5,496,487	
Okla.	420,375	28.93%	–	949,136	65.32%	7	83,481	5.75%	–	–	–	–	–	–	–	–	–	–	528,761	37.08%	1,452,992	
Ore.	1,002,106	50.07%	7	782,403	39.09%	–	94,231	4.71%	–	50,002	2.50%	–	–	–	–	72,594	3.63%	–	−219,703	−10.98%	2,001,336	
Pa.	2,926,441	47.46%	–	2,970,733	48.18%	20	146,715	2.38%	–	49,941	0.81%	–	6,472	0.11%	–	65,176	1.06%	–	44,292	0.72%	6,165,478	
R.I.	252,525	54.41%	4	180,543	38.90%	–	14,746	3.18%	–	6,220	1.34%	–	516	0.11%	–	9,594	2.07%	–	−71,982	−15.51%	464,144	
S.C.	855,373	40.67%	–	1,155,389	54.94%	9	49,204	2.34%	–	13,034	0.62%	–	21,016	1.00%	–	9,011	0.43%	–	300,016	14.27%	2,103,027	
S.D.	117,458	31.74%	–	227,721	61.53%	3	20,850	5.63%	–	–	–	–	–	–	–	4,064	1.10%	–	110,263	29.79%	370,093	
Tenn.	870,695	34.72%	–	1,522,925	60.72%	11	70,397	2.81%	–	15,993	0.64%	–	11,991	0.48%	–	16,026	0.64%	–	652,230	26.01%	2,508,027	
Texas	3,877,868	43.24%	–	4,685,047	52.23%	36	283,492	3.16%	–	71,558	0.80%	–	42,366	0.47%	–	8,895	0.10%	2	807,179	8.99%	8,969,226	
Utah	310,676	27.46%	–	515,231	45.54%	6	39,608	3.50%	–	9,438	0.83%	–	243,690	21.54%	–	12,787	1.13%	–	204,555	18.08%	1,131,430	
Vt.	178,573	56.68%	3	95,369	30.27%	–	10,078	3.20%	–	6,758	2.14%	–	639	0.20%	–	23,650	7.51%	–	−83,204	−26.41%	315,067	
Va.	1,981,473	49.73%	13	1,769,443	44.41%	–	118,274	2.97%	–	27,638	0.69%	–	54,054	1.36%	–	33,749	0.85%	–	−212,030	−5.32%	3,984,631	
Wash.	1,742,718	52.54%	8	1,221,747	36.83%	–	160,879	4.85%	–	58,417	1.76%	–	–	–	–	133,258	4.02%	4	−520,971	−15.71%	3,317,019	
W.Va.	188,794	26.43%	–	489,371	68.50%	5	23,004	3.22%	–	8,075	1.13%	–	1,104	0.15%	–	4,075	0.57%	–	300,577	42.07%	714,423	
Wis.	1,382,536	46.45%	–	1,405,284	47.22%	10	106,674	3.58%	–	31,072	1.04%	–	11,855	0.40%	–	38,729	1.30%	–	22,748	0.77%	2,976,150	
Wyo.	55,973	21.63%	–	174,419	67.40%	3	13,287	5.13%	–	2,515	0.97%	–	–	–	–	9,655	3.73%	–	118,446	46.30%	255,849	
Total	65,853,514	48.18%	227	62,984,828	46.09%	304	4,489,341	3.28%	–	1,457,218	1.07%	–	731,991	0.54%	–	1,154,084	0.84%	7	−2,868,686	−2.10%	136,669,276	Sources
	Hillary Clinton Democratic			Donald Trump Republican			Gary Johnson Libertarian			Jill Stein Green			Evan McMullin Independent			Others			Margin		Total votes	Sources

^{★}Two states (Maine and Nebraska) allow for their electoral votes to be split between candidates. The winner within each congressional district gets one electoral vote for the district. The winner of the statewide vote gets two additional electoral votes. Results are from the Associated Press.

== Election campaign 2016 candidate participation timeline ==
Candidate announcement and, if applicable, withdrawal dates are as follows:

== See also ==
- 2004 United States presidential election timeline
- 2008 United States presidential election timeline
- 2012 United States presidential election timeline
- Democratic Party presidential primaries, 2016
- Republican Party presidential primaries, 2016
- Libertarian Party presidential primaries, 2016
- Green Party presidential primaries, 2016
- Timeline of the presidency of Donald Trump
