= 2016 Virginia Republican presidential primary =

- March 1, 2016
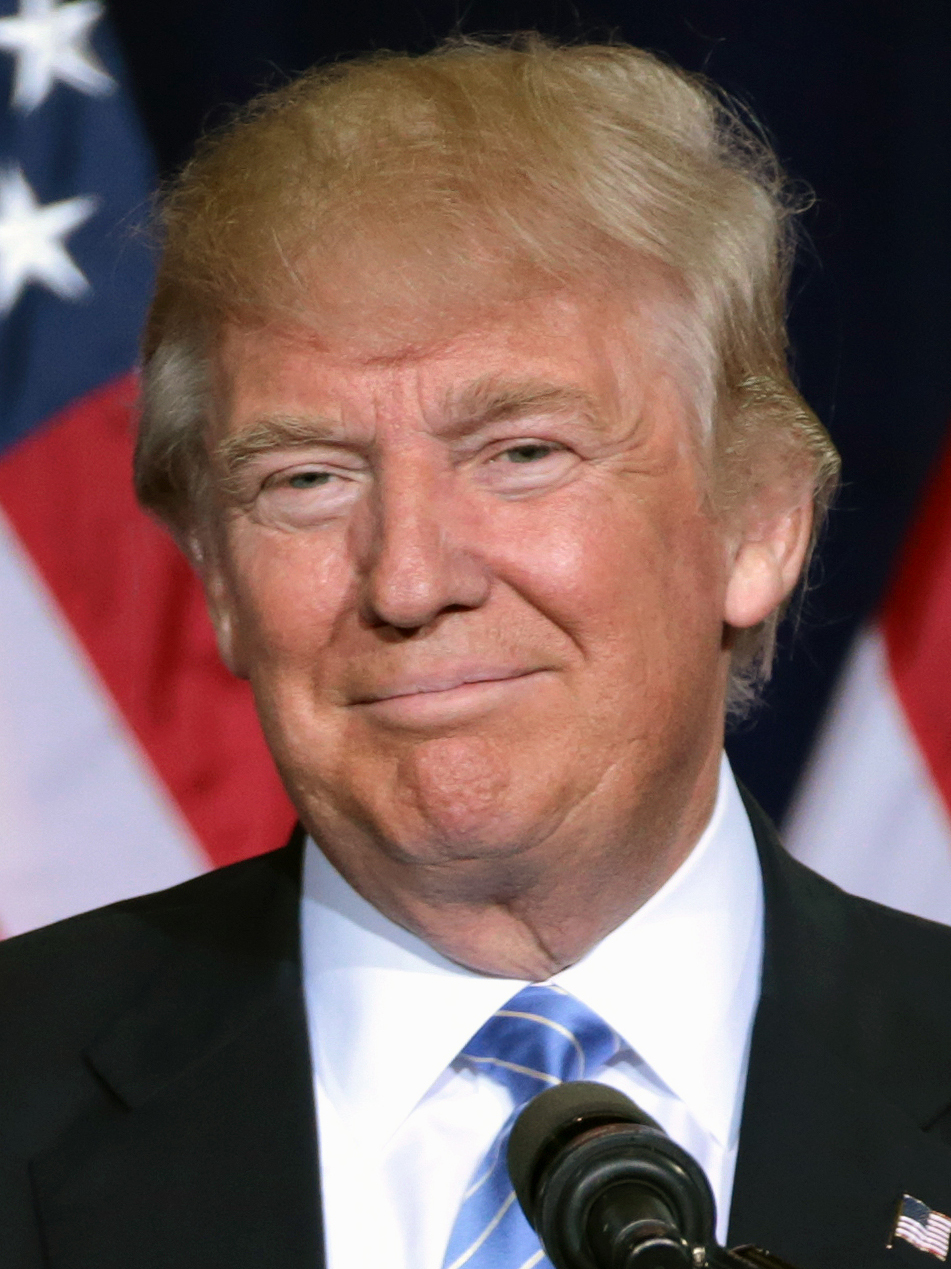

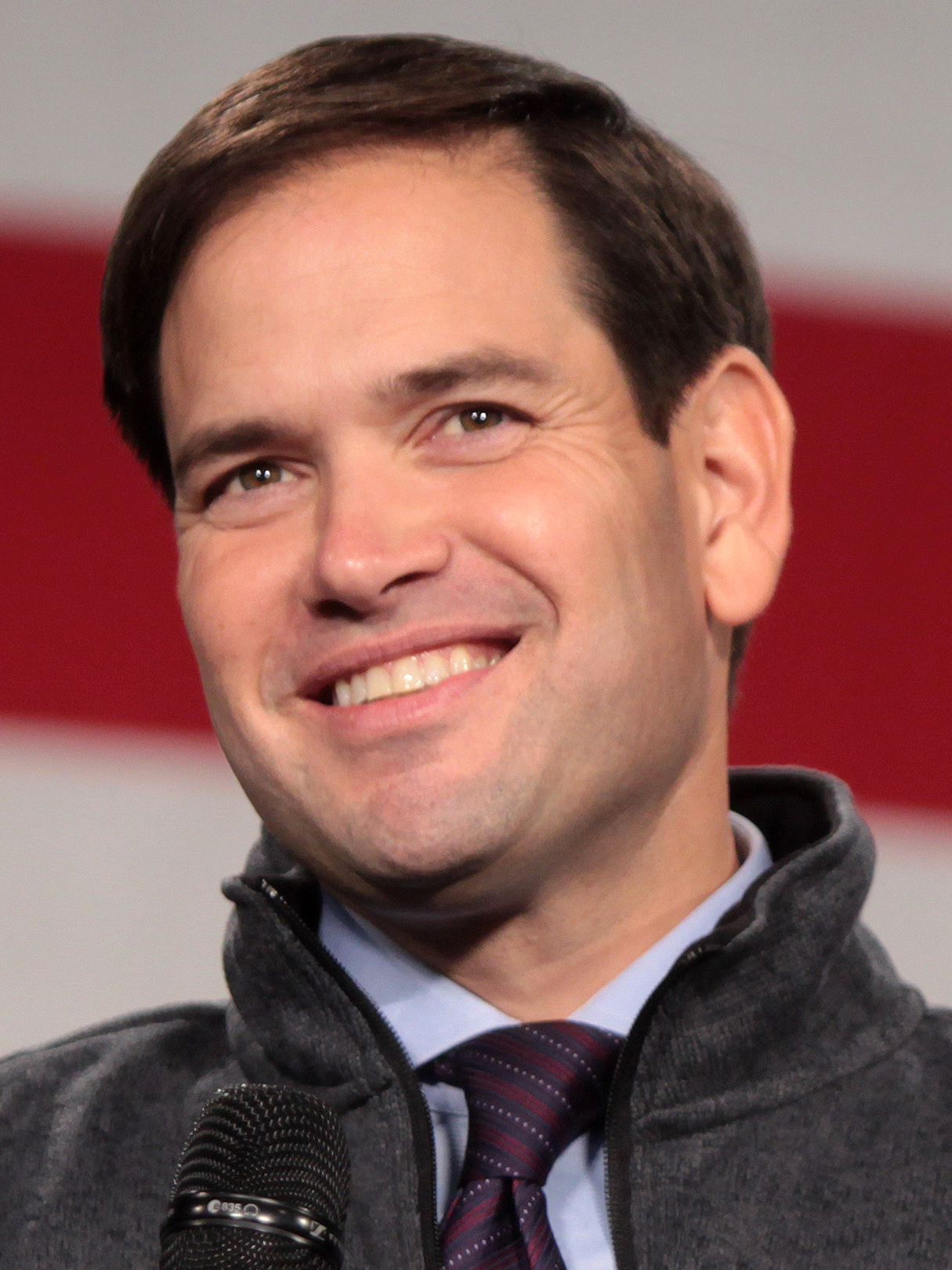

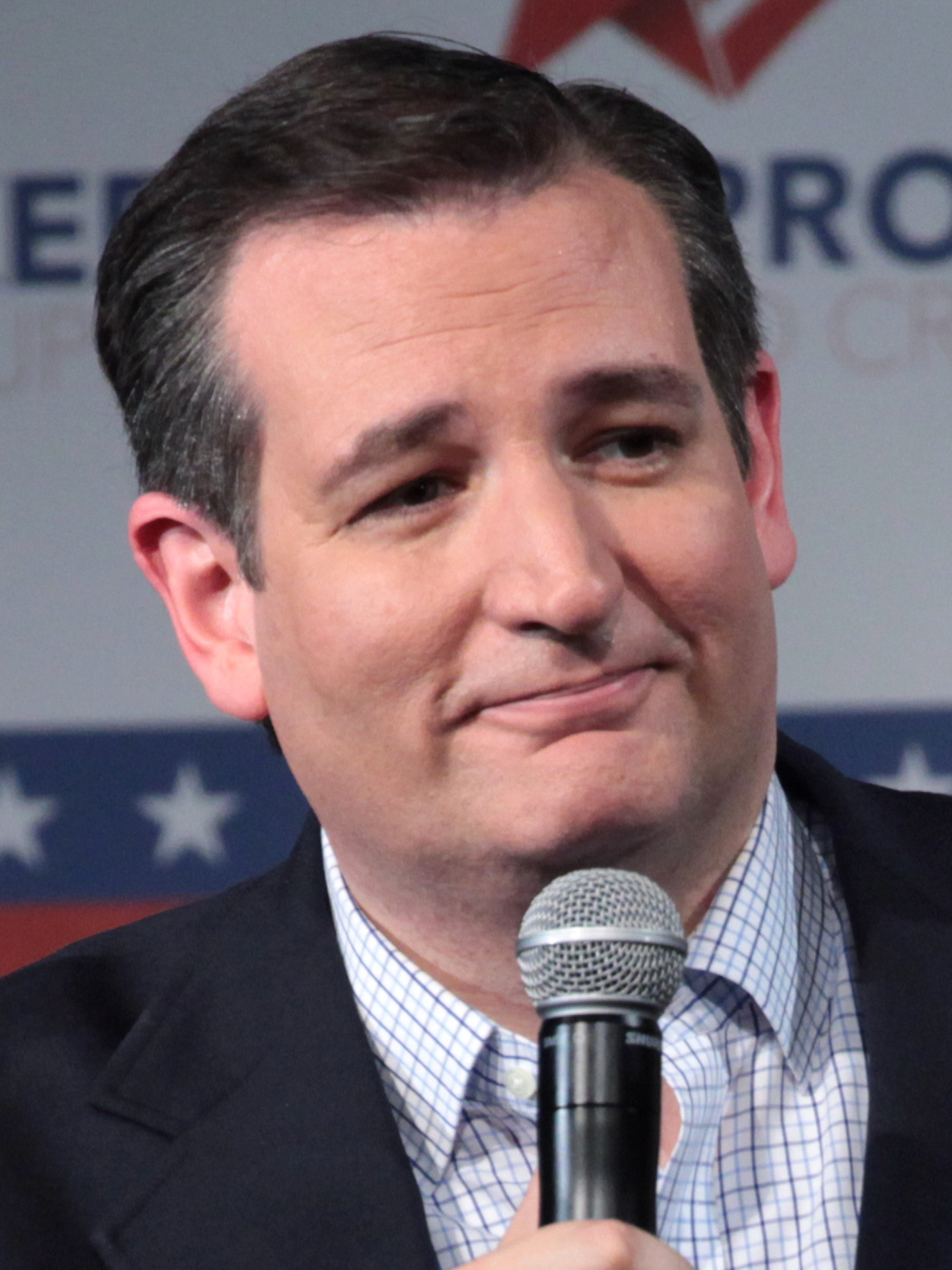

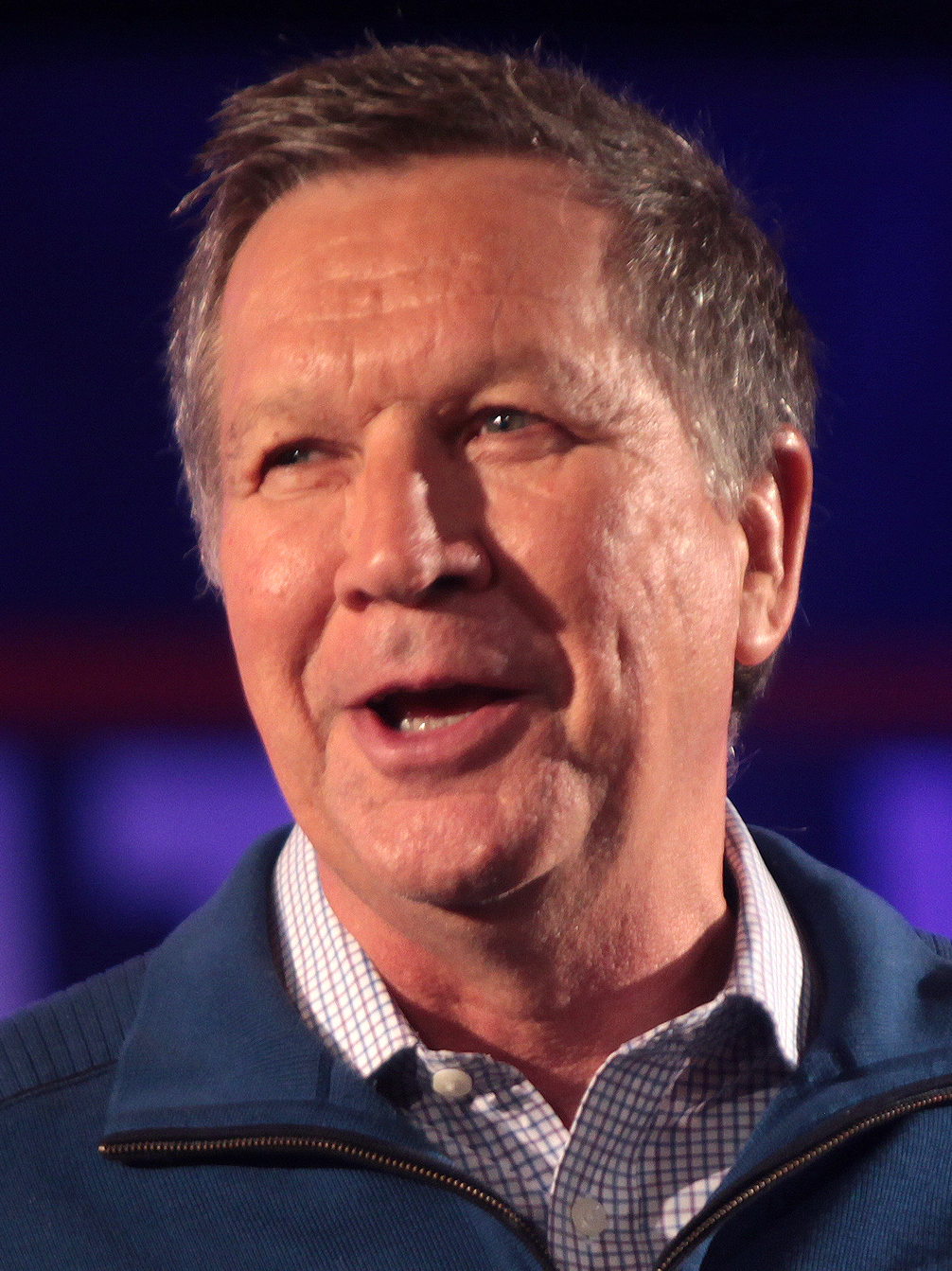

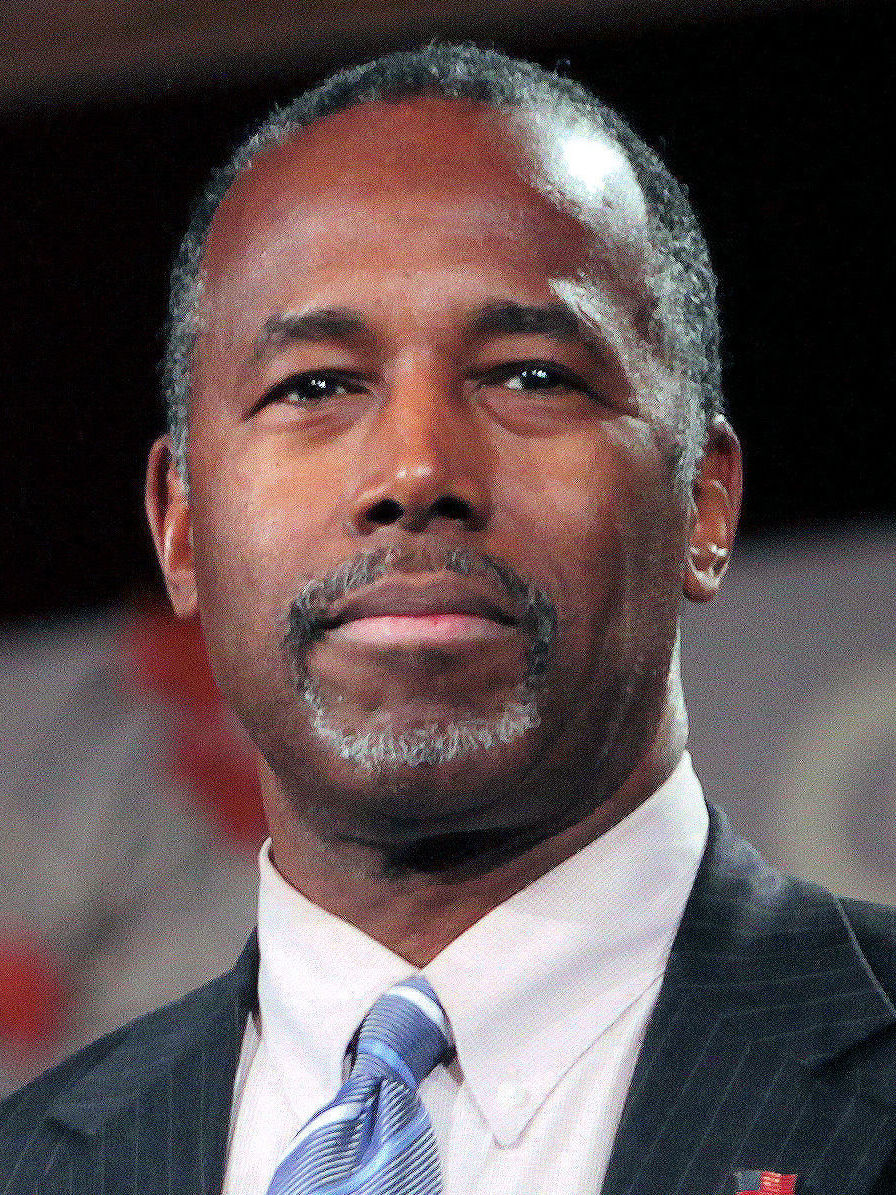
Candidate	Donald Trump	Marco Rubio	Ted Cruz
Home state	New York	Florida	Texas
Delegate count	17	16	8
Popular vote	356,840	327,918	171,150
Percentage	34.80%	31.98%	16.69%
Candidate	John Kasich	Ben Carson
Home state	Ohio	Virginia
Delegate count	5	3
Popular vote	97,784	60,228
Percentage	9.54%	5.87%

Donald Trump 30-40% 40-50% 50-60% 60-70%	Marco Rubio 30-40% 40-50%

The 2016 Virginia Republican presidential primary was held on March 1, 2016, as part of the 2016 Republican Party primaries for the 2016 presidential election. 49 delegates from Virginia to the Republican National Convention were allocated proportionally based on the popular vote. Donald Trump edged out a narrow plurality of pledged delegates, with Marco Rubio coming in second place and Ted Cruz placing in a distant third.

The Virginia Democratic primary occurred on the same day.

== Polling ==
Winner: Donald Trump
Primary date: March 1, 2016

Poll source	Date	1st	2nd	3rd	Other
	March 1, 2016	Donald Trump; 34.80%	Marco Rubio; 31.98%	Ted Cruz; 16.69%	John Kasich 9.54%, Ben Carson 5.87%, Jeb Bush 0.36%, Rand Paul 0.28%, Mike Huckabee 0.14%, Chris Christie 0.11%, Carly Fiorina 0.09%, Jim Gilmore 0.06%, Lindsey Graham 0.04%, Rick Santorum 0.04%
CBS/YouGov Margin of error: ± 8.6% Sample size: 481	February 22–26, 2016	Donald Trump; 40%	Marco Rubio; 27%	Ted Cruz; 22%	John Kasich 6%, Ben Carson 4%, Undecided 1%
Monmouth University Margin of error: ± 4.8% Sample size: 421	February 22–24, 2016	Donald Trump; 41%	Marco Rubio; 27%	Ted Cruz; 14%	John Kasich 7%, Ben Carson 7%, Undecided 4%
Roanoke College Margin of error: ± 4.5% Sample size: 466	February 16–24, 2016	Donald Trump; 38%	Ted Cruz; 15%	Marco Rubio; 13%	John Kasich 8%, Ben Carson 8%, Undecided 19%
Christopher Newport University Margin of error: ± 5.6% Sample size: 368	February 3–14, 2016	Donald Trump; 28%	Marco Rubio; 22%	Ted Cruz; 19%	Ben Carson 7%, John Kasich 7%, Jeb Bush 4%, Chris Christie 4%, Carly Fiorina 2%, Jim Gilmore <1%, Someone else 1%, Undecided 6%
University of Mary Washington Margin of error: ± ?% Sample size: 333	November 4–9, 2015	Ben Carson; 29%	Donald Trump; 24%	Marco Rubio; 11%	Ted Cruz 10%, Jeb Bush 5%, Carly Fiorina 5%, Rand Paul 4%, Chris Christie 4%, Mike Huckabee 4%, John Kasich 1%, Jim Gilmore 0%, Don't know 2%
Christopher Newport University Margin of error: ± 5.1% Sample size: 412	September 29 – October 8, 2015	Donald Trump; 23%	Ben Carson; 17%	Marco Rubio; 14%	Carly Fiorina 13%, Jeb Bush 9%, Ted Cruz 5%, Chris Christie 4%, Mike Huckabee 3%, John Kasich 2%, Rand Paul 2%, Lindsey Graham 1%, Bobby Jindal <1%, George Pataki <1%, Rick Santorum <1%, Jim Gilmore <1%, Someone else 1%, Undecided 5%
Opinion Savvy/Insider Advantage Margin of error: ± 4.1% Sample size: 546	August 2–3, 2015	Donald Trump; 27.9%	Jeb Bush; 14.8%	Scott Walker; 10.1%	Ben Carson 8%, Carly Fiorina 6.8%, Ted Cruz 6.4%, Rand Paul 5.1%, Marco Rubio 3.5%, John Kasich 3.2%, Chris Christie 3.1%, Rick Perry 2.3%, Mike Huckabee 1.5%, Bobby Jindal 1%, Lindsey Graham 0.7%, George Pataki 0.7%, Rick Santorum 0%, Someone else 1.8%, Undecided 3.2%
Public Policy Polling Margin of error: ± 4.4% Sample size: 502	July 13–15, 2015	Jeb Bush; 18%	Donald Trump; 14%	Scott Walker; 14%	Ben Carson 10%, Mike Huckabee 8%, Marco Rubio 7%, Chris Christie 5%, Ted Cruz 5%, Carly Fiorina 5%, Rand Paul 5%, Bobby Jindal 3%, Rick Perry 2%, Jim Gilmore 1%, Lindsey Graham 1%, John Kasich 1%, Rick Santorum 1%, George Pataki 0%, Someone else/Not sure 3%
Christopher Newport University Margin of error: ± ? Sample size: ?	April 13–24, 2015	Jeb Bush; 17%	Marco Rubio; 16%	Chris Christie; 10%	Rand Paul 10%, Scott Walker 10%, Ben Carson 7%, Ted Cruz 7%, Mike Huckabee 6%, Donald Trump 5%, Bobby Jindal 2%, Carly Fiorina 1%, John Kasich <1%, Rick Perry <1%, Rick Santorum <1%, Someone else <1%, Undecided 7%
Christopher Newport University Margin of error: ± 3.6% Sample size: 794	January 30 – February 10, 2015	Jeb Bush; 21%	Scott Walker; 16%	Chris Christie; 10%	Mike Huckabee 10%, Ben Carson 9%, Rand Paul 6%, Marco Rubio 6%, Paul Ryan 5%, Ted Cruz 3%, John Kasich 3%, Bobby Jindal 2%, Mike Pence 1%, Rick Perry 1%, Rob Portman 1%, Rick Santorum 1%, Someone else 1%, Undecided 4%
Christopher Newport University Margin of error: ± 5.3% Sample size: 338	February 23–28, 2014	Chris Christie; 19%	Jeb Bush; 18%	Mike Huckabee; 13%	Paul Ryan 13%, Ted Cruz 9%, Rand Paul 7%, Marco Rubio 4%, Scott Walker 3%, Undecided 13%
University of Mary Washington Margin of error: ±? Sample size: ?	September 25–29, 2013	Chris Christie; 20%	Jeb Bush; 10%	Rand Paul; 10%	Paul Ryan 8%, Marco Rubio 7%, Ted Cruz 5%, None 14%, Don't know 19%
Public Policy Polling Margin of error: ±4.8% Sample size: 415	July 11–14, 2013	Jeb Bush; 16%	Chris Christie; 16%	Rand Paul; 15%	Marco Rubio 12%, Paul Ryan 11%, Ted Cruz 9%, Bob McDonnell 8%, Bobby Jindal 4%, Rick Santorum 2%, Someone Else/Undecided 7%
Public Policy Polling Margin of error: ±4.4% Sample size: 500	May 24–26, 2013	Marco Rubio; 17%	Chris Christie; 15%	Jeb Bush; 14%	Bob McDonnell 12%, Rand Paul 10%, Ted Cruz 8%, Paul Ryan 8%, Bobby Jindal 3%, Rick Santorum 2%, Someone Else/Undecided 11%
Public Policy Polling Margin of error: ±4.4% Sample size: 500	May 24–26, 2013	Chris Christie; 20%	Marco Rubio; 20%	Jeb Bush; 17%	Paul Ryan 10%, Rand Paul 9%, Ted Cruz 8%, Bobby Jindal 3%, Rick Santorum 2%, Someone Else/Undecided 10%
University of Mary Washington Margin of error: ±3.5; Sample size: 1004	March 20–24, 2013	Chris Christie; 18%	Bob McDonnell; 12%	Rand Paul; 11%	Paul Ryan 11%, Marco Rubio 9%, Jeb Bush 8%, Other 1%, None 10%, Don't know 16%

== Results ==
Virginia Republican primary, March 1, 2016
Candidate	Votes	Percentage	Actual delegate count		
Candidate	Votes	Percentage	Bound	Unbound	Total
Donald Trump	356,840	34.80%	17	0	17
Marco Rubio	327,918	31.98%	16	0	16
Ted Cruz	171,150	16.69%	8	0	8
John Kasich	97,784	9.54%	5	0	5
Ben Carson	60,228	5.87%	3	0	3
Jeb Bush (withdrawn)	3,645	0.36%	0	0	0
Rand Paul (withdrawn)	2,917	0.28%	0	0	0
Mike Huckabee (withdrawn)	1,458	0.14%	0	0	0
Chris Christie (withdrawn)	1,102	0.11%	0	0	0
Carly Fiorina (withdrawn)	914	0.09%	0	0	0
Jim Gilmore (withdrawn)	653	0.06%	0	0	0
Lindsey Graham (withdrawn)	444	0.04%	0	0	0
Rick Santorum (withdrawn)	399	0.04%	0	0	0
Unprojected delegates:			0	0	0
Total:	1,025,452	100.00%	49	0	49

== See also ==
- 2016 Republican Party presidential primaries
- 2016 United States presidential election
