= 2016 Oklahoma Republican presidential primary =

- March 1, 2016
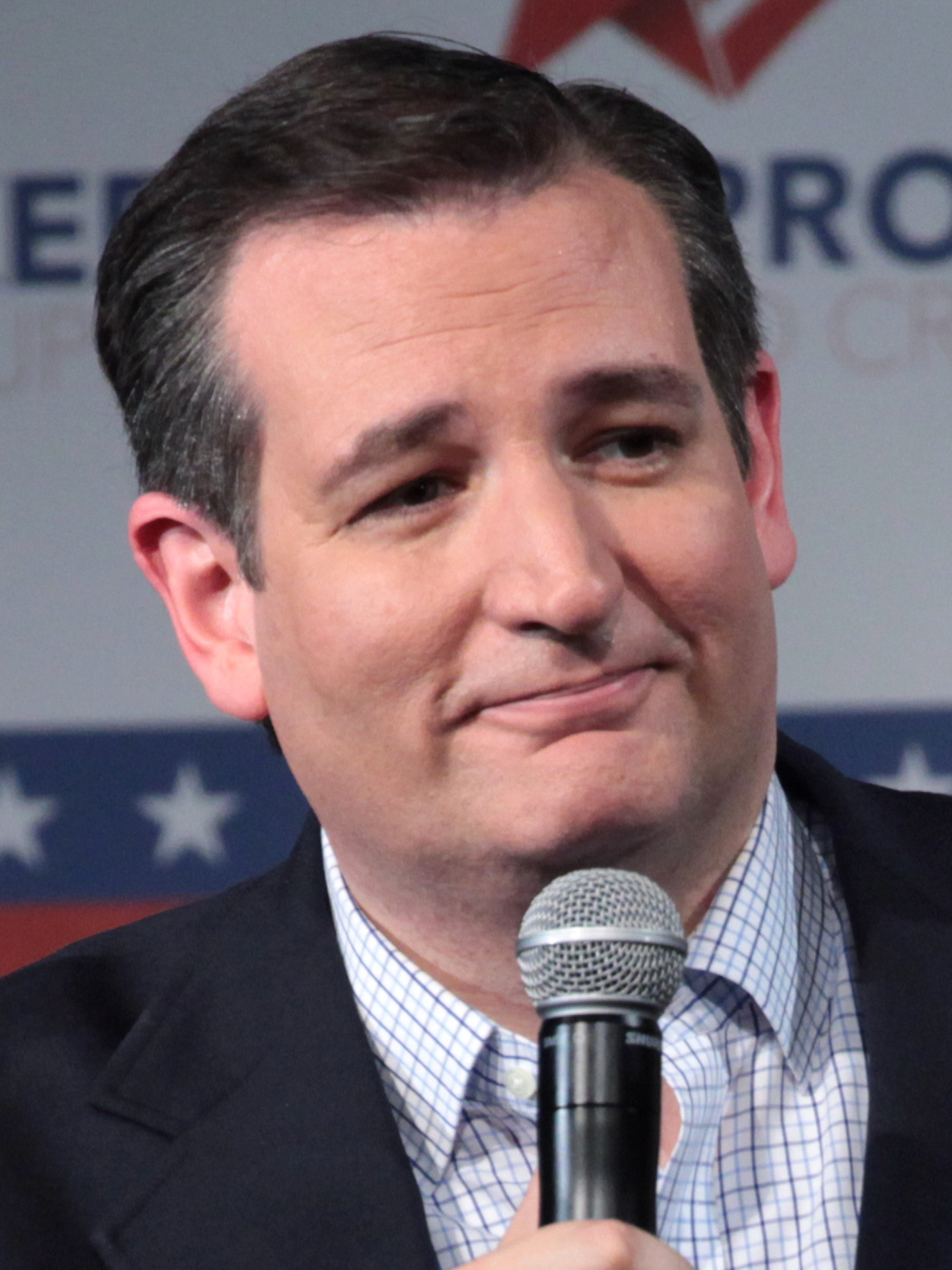

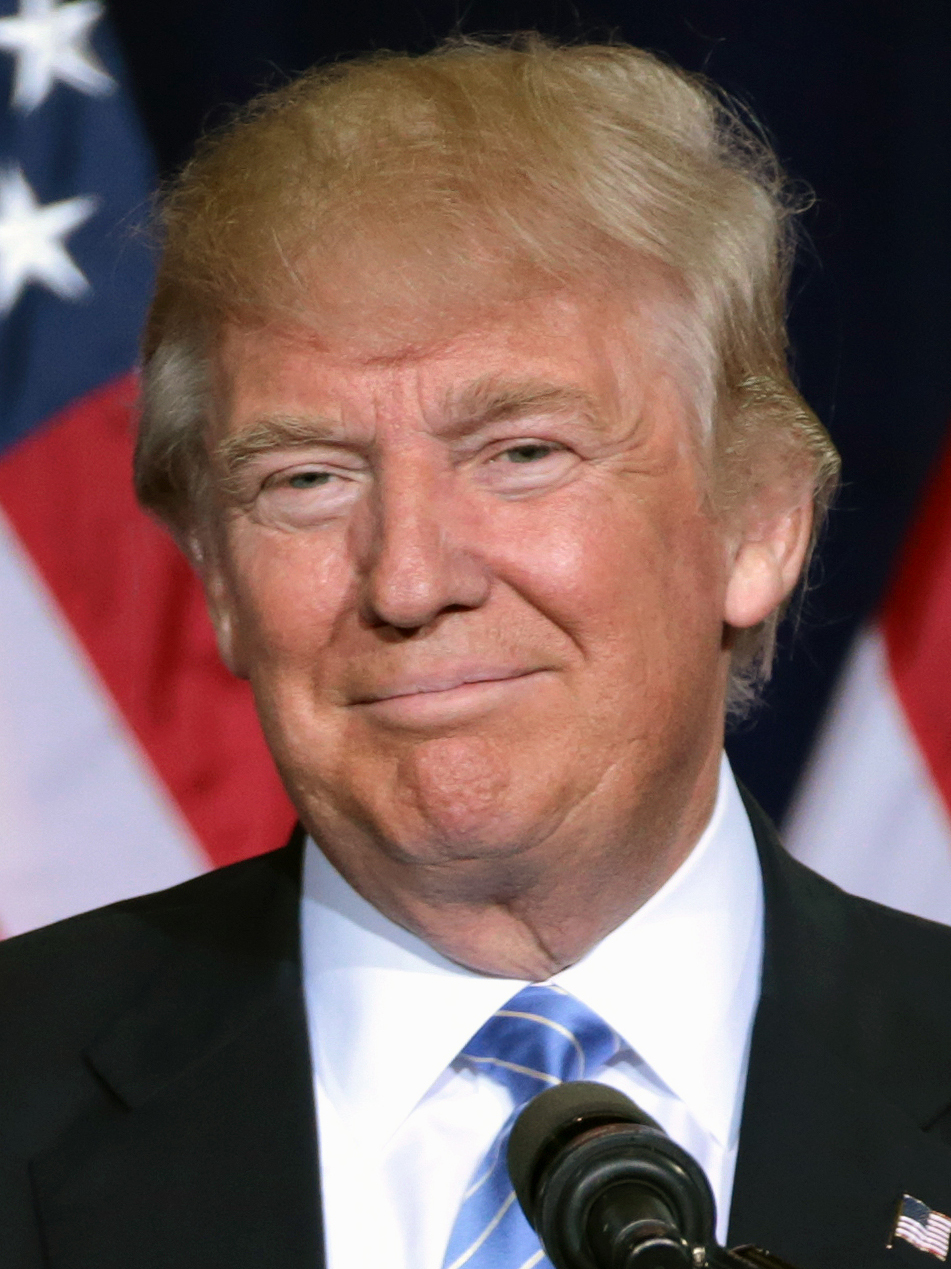

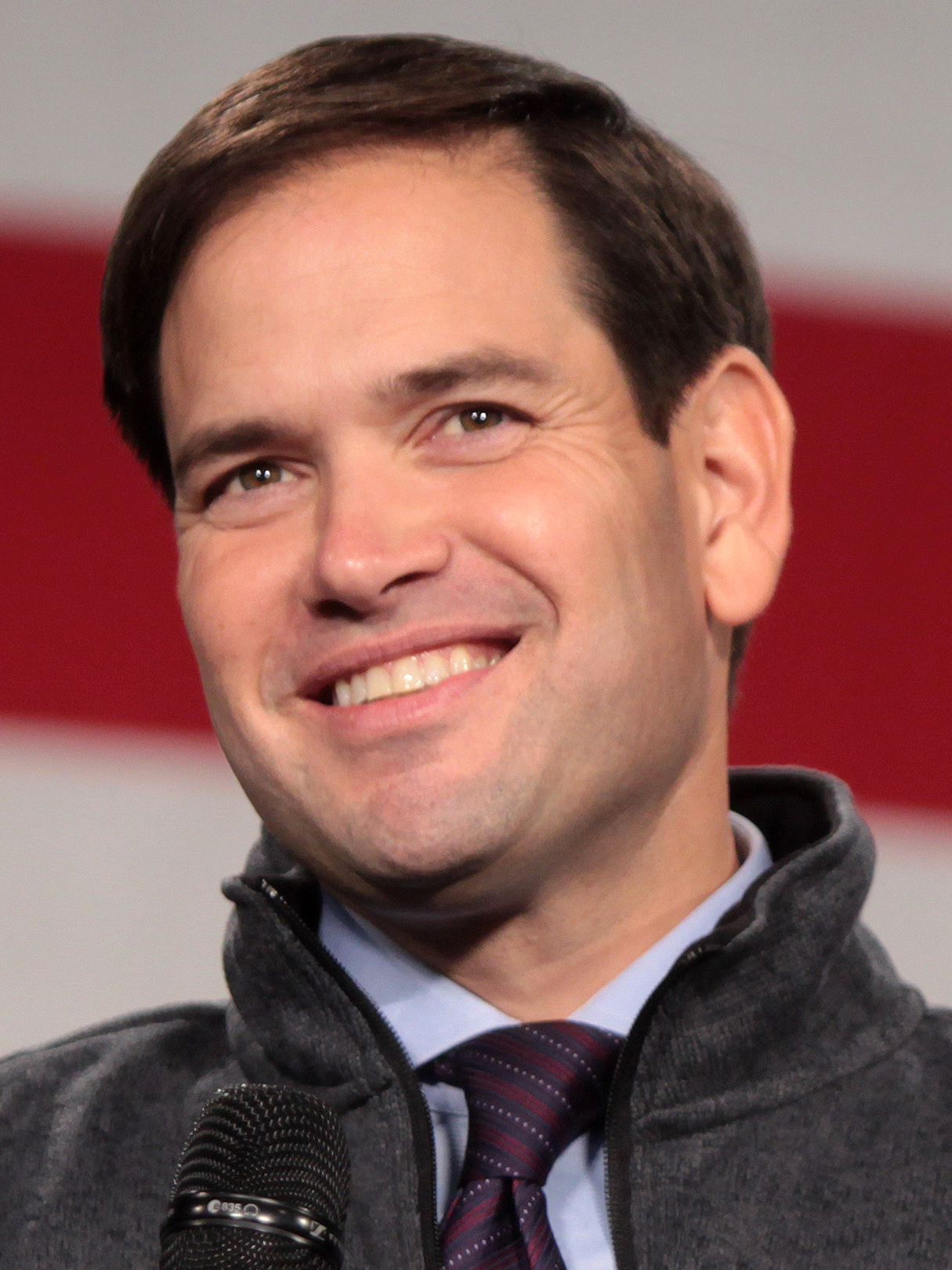

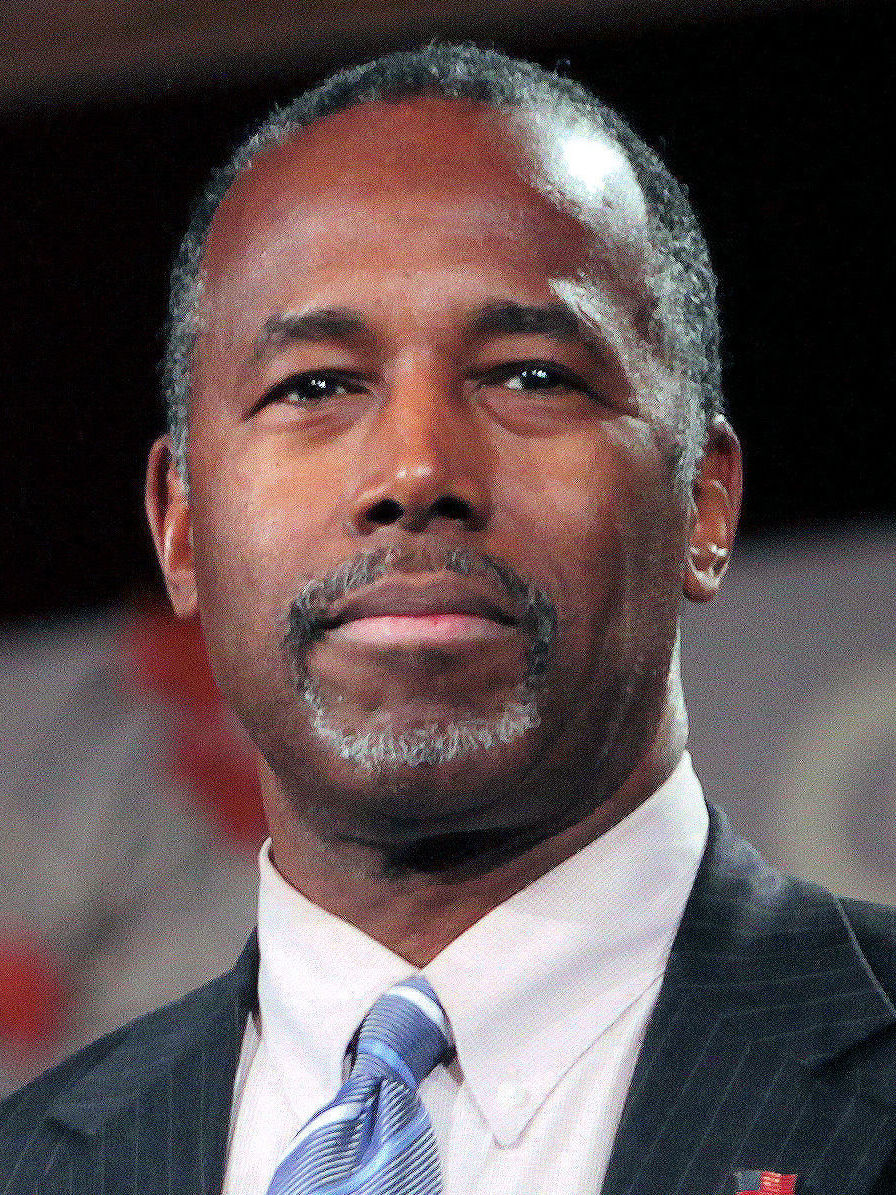
Candidate	Ted Cruz	Donald Trump
Home state	Texas	New York
Delegate count	15	14
Popular vote	158,078	130,267
Percentage	34.37%	28.32%
Candidate	Marco Rubio	Ben Carson
Home state	Florida	Maryland
Delegate count	12	0
Popular vote	119,633	28,601
Percentage	26.01%	6.22%
County results
Ted Cruz
30–40%
40–50%
50–60%
Donald Trump
30–40%
40–50%
Marco Rubio
30–40%

The 2016 Oklahoma Republican presidential primary took place on March 1 in the U.S. state of Oklahoma as one of the Republican Party's primaries ahead of the 2016 presidential election.

On the same day, dubbed "Super Tuesday," Democratic primaries were held in thirteen other states, while the Democratic Party held primaries in ten other states plus American Samoa, including their own Oklahoma primary.

Twelve candidates appeared on the Republican presidential primary ballot.

== Results ==
Oklahoma Republican primary, March 1, 2016
Candidate	Votes	Percentage	Actual delegate count		
Candidate	Votes	Percentage	Bound	Unbound	Total
Ted Cruz	158,078	34.37%	15	0	15
Donald Trump	130,267	28.32%	14	0	14
Marco Rubio	119,633	26.01%	12	0	12
Ben Carson	28,601	6.22%	0	0	0
John Kasich	16,524	3.59%	0	0	0
Jeb Bush (withdrawn)	2,091	0.45%	0	0	0
Rand Paul (withdrawn)	1,666	0.36%	0	0	0
Mike Huckabee (withdrawn)	1,308	0.28%	0	0	0
Carly Fiorina (withdrawn)	610	0.13%	0	0	0
Chris Christie (withdrawn)	545	0.12%	0	0	0
Rick Santorum (withdrawn)	375	0.08%	0	0	0
Lindsey Graham (withdrawn)	224	0.05%	0	0	0
Unprojected delegates:			2	0	2
Total:	459,922	100.00%	43	0	43
Source: The Green Papers
