= 2016 U.S. Virgin Islands Republican presidential caucuses =

- March 10, 2016

9 delegates to the Republican National Convention (6 bound, 3 unbound)
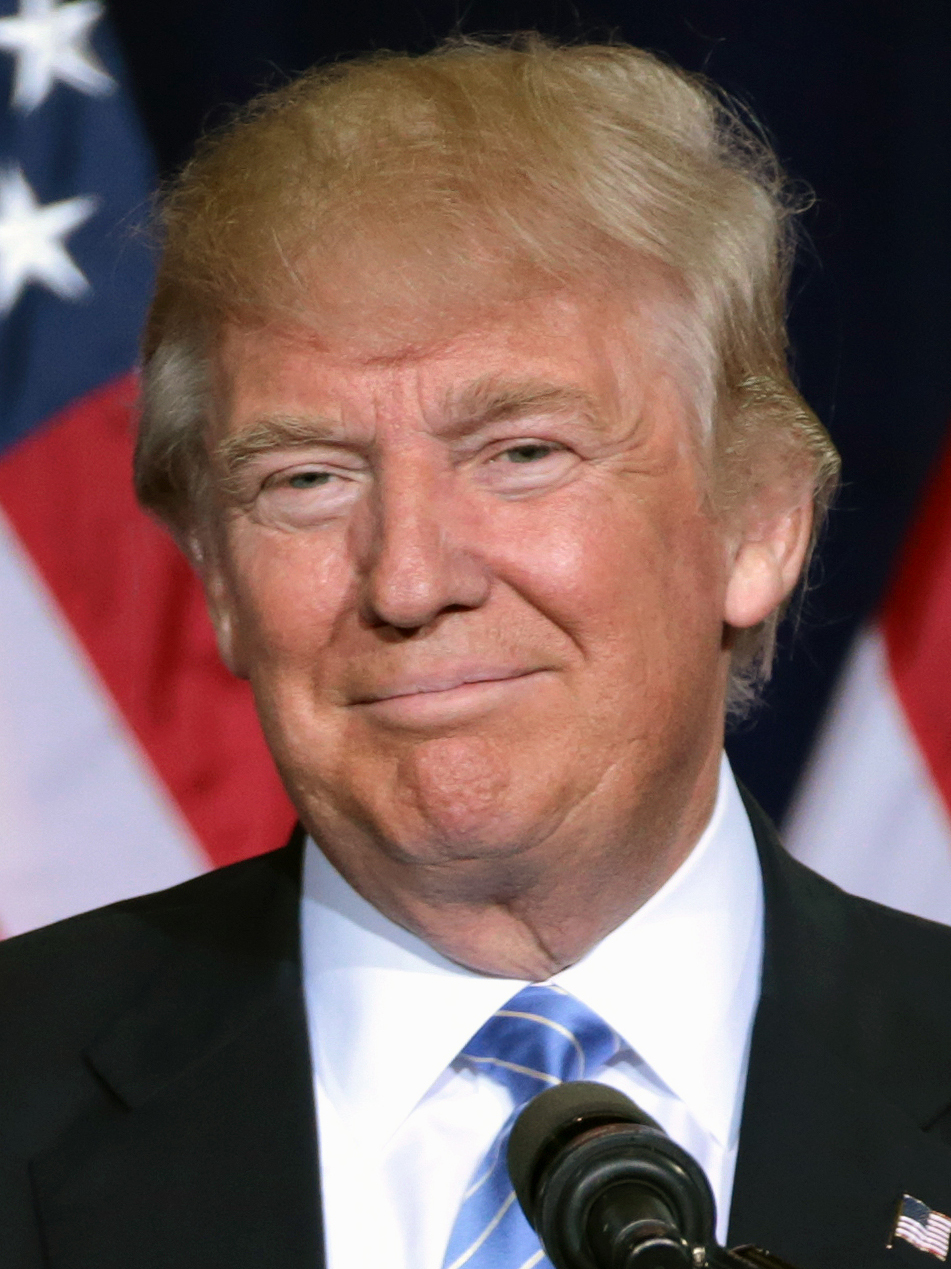

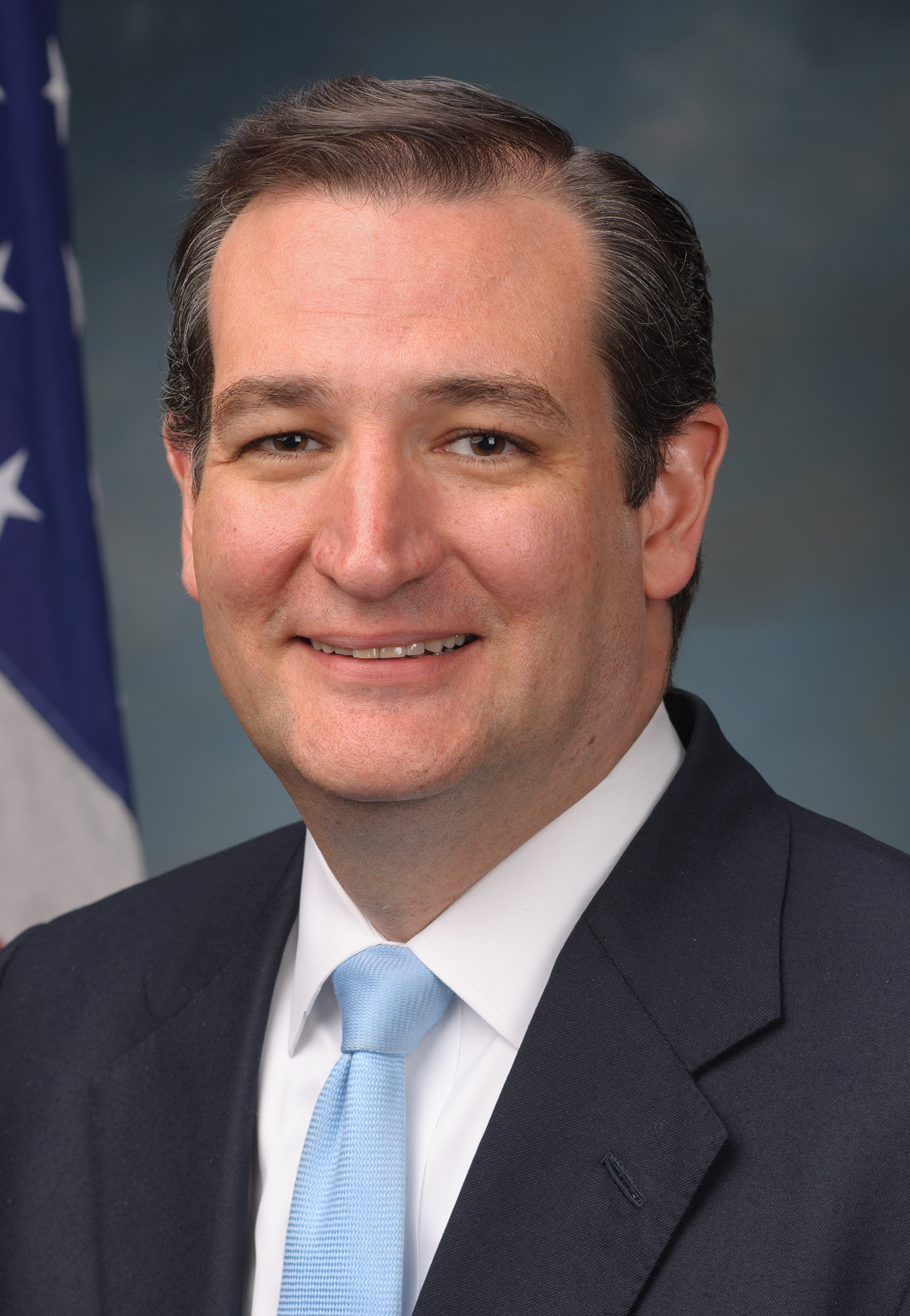

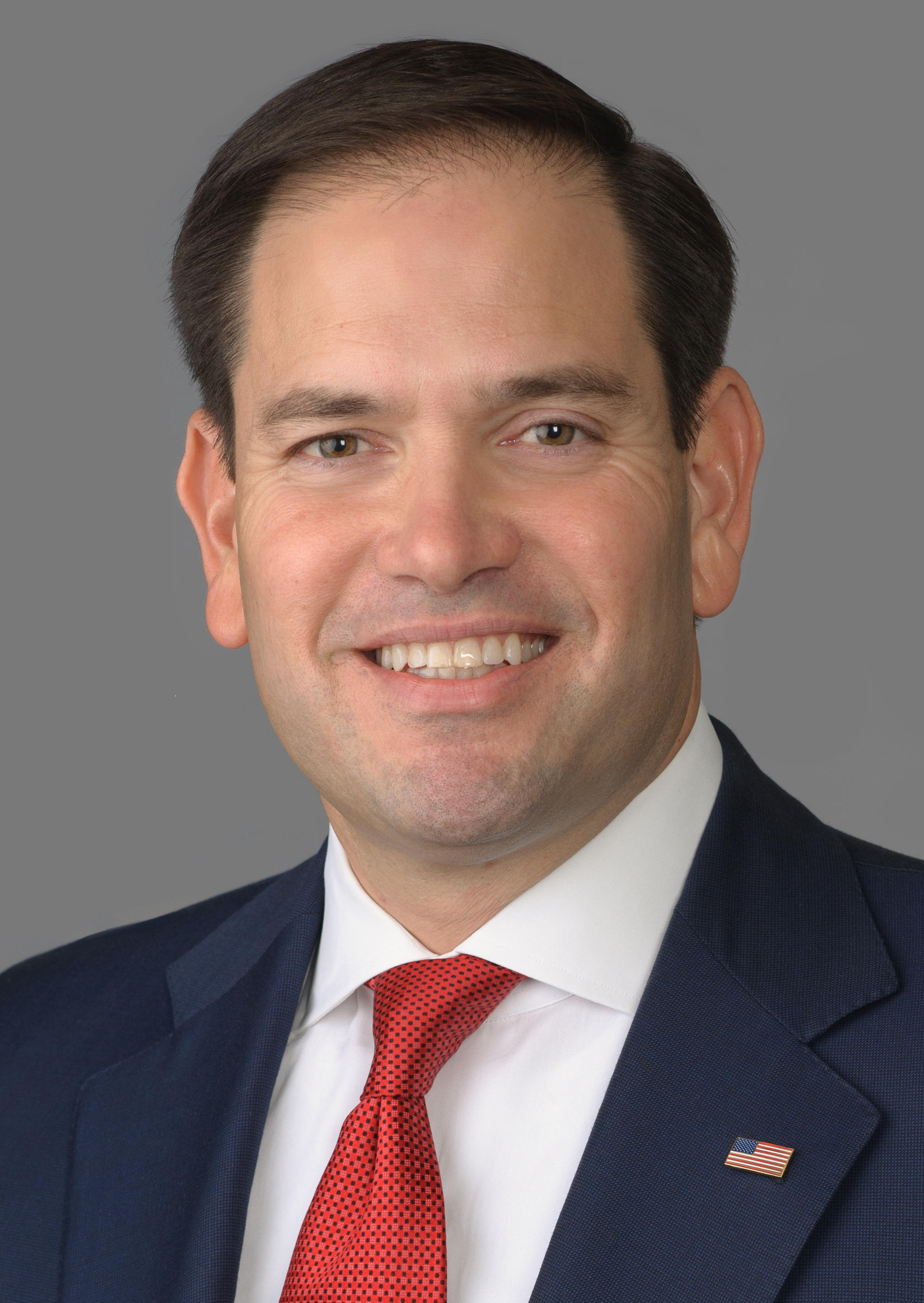

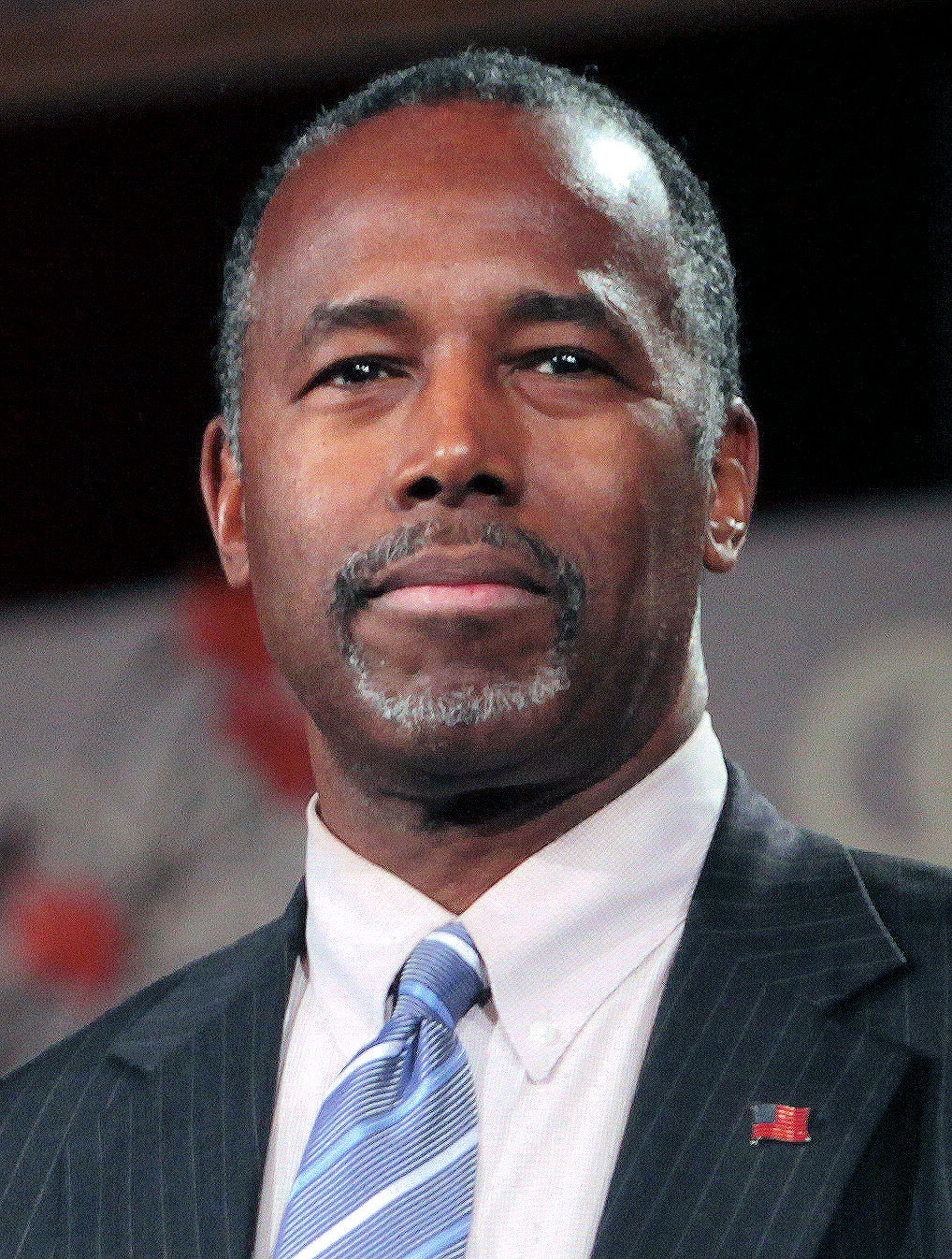
Candidate	Donald Trump	Uncommitted	Ted Cruz
Home state	New York	N/A	Texas
Delegate count	8	1	0
Popular vote	104	1,063	191
Percentage	6.4%	65.3%	11.7%
Candidate	Marco Rubio	Ben Carson
Home state	Florida	Florida
Delegate count	0	0
Popular vote	161	108
Percentage	9.9%	6.6%

The 2016 U.S. Virgin Islands Republican presidential caucuses took place on March 10 in the U.S. territory of the United States Virgin Islands as one of the Republican Party's primaries ahead of the 2016 presidential election.

While on the same day, neither the Republican Party nor the Democratic Party held any other primaries, the Democratic Party's own Virgin Islands caucuses took place only on June 4.

Six of Virgin Islands' nine Republican delegates were elected during a Presidential caucus. Territorial Caucuses met from noon to 6 p.m. Atlantic Standard Time on St. Croix, St. Thomas, and St. John as a Convention to vote for Presidential Preference and select at-large delegates to the Republican National Convention.

Three party leaders—the National Committeeman, the National Committeewoman, and the chairman of the Virgin Islands's Republican Party—attended the convention by virtue of their position. On election day all six delegates were voted to be uncommitted to the national convention in Ohio. All 6 delegates were disqualified by the territorial party and were replaced. Rubio received 2 delegates, 2 delegates were uncommitted, Ted Cruz received 1, and Donald Trump received 1. At the convention, nominee Donald Trump received 8 of 9 total delegates.

== Results ==
Virgin Islands Republican territorial caucus, March 10, 2016
Candidate	Votes	Percentage	Actual delegate count		
Candidate	Votes	Percentage	Bound	Unbound	Total
Uncommitted	1,063	65.3%	1	0	0
Ted Cruz	191	11.7%	0	0	0
Marco Rubio	161	9.9%	0	0	0
Ben Carson (withdrawn)	108	6.6%	0	0	0
Donald Trump	104	6.4%	5	3	8
Unprojected delegates:			0	0	0
Total:	1,627	100.00%	6	3	9

Trump's 5th-place finish was his worst performance in the Republican primaries, although all the delegates decided to back him after he was determined as the presumptive nominee.

=== Delegates ===
==== RNC Delegates ====
1. John Canegata (Republican Party Chairman) (automatically a delegate)
2. Lilliana Belardo de O'Neal (RNC Committeewoman) (automatically a delegate)
3. Holland Redfield, II (RNC Committeeman) (automatically a delegate)

==== Original ====
1. John P. Yob (uncommitted)
2. Gwendolyn D. 'Gwen' Hall Brady (uncommitted)
3. Warren B. Cole (uncommitted)
4. Erica L. Yob (uncommitted)
5. George H. Logan (uncommitted)
6. Lindsey Eilon (uncommitted)

==== Replacements ====
1. David Johnson (uncommitted)
2. Valerie L.Stiles (Marco Rubio)
3. Andrea Lee Moeekel (uncommitted)
4. Humberto O’Neal (Marco Rubio)
5. Steven K. Hardy (Donald Trump)
6. Robert Max Schanfarber (Ted Cruz)
