= 2016 Oklahoma Democratic presidential primary =

- March 1, 2016

Candidate	Bernie Sanders	Hillary Clinton
Home state	Vermont	New York
Delegate count	22	18
Popular vote	174,228	139,443
Percentage	51.88%	41.52%
- County results Sanders: 40-50% 50-60% 60-70% Clinton: 40-50% 50-60%

The 2016 Oklahoma Democratic presidential primary took place on March 1 in the U.S. state of Oklahoma as one of the Democratic Party's primaries ahead of the 2016 presidential election.

On the same day, dubbed "Super Tuesday," Democratic primaries were held in ten other states plus American Samoa, while the Republican Party held primaries in eleven states including their own Oklahoma primary.

== Opinion polling ==
Poll source	Date	1st	2nd	3rd	Other
Official Primary results	March 1, 2016	Bernie Sanders; 51.9%	Hillary Clinton; 41.5%		Others; 6.6%
Monmouth Margin of error: ± 5.7% Sample size: 300	February 25–28, 2016	Bernie Sanders; 48%	Hillary Clinton; 43%		Others / Undecided; 9%
Sooner Poll/News 9/News on 6 Margin of error: ± 4.3% Sample size: 510	February 23–25, 2016	Hillary Clinton; 40%	Bernie Sanders; 31%		Others / Undecided; 29%
Public Policy Polling Margin of error: ± 4.2% Sample size: 542	February 14–16, 2016	Hillary Clinton; 46%	Bernie Sanders; 44%		Undecided 9%
Sooner Poll Margin of error: ± 5.0% Sample size: 360	February 6–9, 2016	Hillary Clinton; 43.9%	Bernie Sanders; 28%		Undecided 28.1%
Sooner Poll Margin of error: ± 5.1% Sample size: 369	November 12–15, 2015	Hillary Clinton; 46.6%	Bernie Sanders; 12.2%	Martin O'Malley; 2.2%	Undecided 39.1%
The Oklahoman/Cole Hargrave Snodgrass & Associates Margin of error: ± 4.3% Sample size: 550	October 19–22, 2015	Hillary Clinton; 30%	Bernie Sanders; 21%	Martin O'Malley; 1%	Undecided 46%

== Results ==
Primary date: March 1, 2016
National delegates: 91

Oklahoma Democratic primary, March 1, 2016
Candidate	Popular vote		Estimated delegates		
Candidate	Count	Percentage	Pledged	Unpledged	Total
Bernie Sanders	174,228	51.88%	21	1	22
Hillary Clinton	139,443	41.52%	17	1	18
Martin O'Malley (withdrawn)	7,672	2.28%			
Keith Judd	4,386	1.31%			
Michael Steinberg	4,171	1.24%			
Star Locke (withdrawn)	3,458	1.03%			
Rocky De La Fuente	2,485	0.74%			
Uncommitted	—N/a		0	2	2
Total	335,843	100%	38	4	42

=== Results by county ===
County	Clinton	Votes	Sanders	Votes
Adair	33.4%	582	55.8%	971
Alfalfa	28.0%	92	58.1%	191
Atoka	28.4%	370	55.4%	723
Beaver	28.9%	52	52.2%	94
Beckham	31.2%	464	55.4%	824
Blaine	37.3%	313	51.8%	435
Bryan	31.2%	1,050	56.8%	1,913
Caddo	36.4%	1,060	53.0%	1,543
Canadian	38.4%	3,357	56.3%	4,922
Carter	32.3%	1,240	55.0%	2,113
Cherokee	38.7%	2,023	55.4%	2,897
Choctaw	29.0%	384	56.4%	745
Cimarron	17.5%	22	54.0%	68
Cleveland	37.6%	10,433	59.3%	16,428
Coal	19.0%	136	63.6%	456
Comanche	44.9%	3,523	48.5%	3,804
Cotton	29.7%	204	56.4%	388
Craig	35.8%	609	54.5%	926
Creek	35.8%	609	50.9%	926
Custer	33.6%	750	57.1%	1,273
Delaware	41.2%	1,447	50.5%	1,773
Dewey	27.5%	134	55.4%	270
Ellis	23.3%	70	64.1%	193
Garfield	41.3%	1,403	52.2%	1,771
Garvin	32.7%	909	54.1%	1,505
Grady	34.2%	1,629	56.2%	2,677
Grant	31.9%	125	57.1%	224
Greer	27.6%	164	55.8%	332
Harmon	37.2%	122	50.9%	167
Harper	26.1%	68	57.9%	151
Haskell	32.8%	475	51.9%	752
Hughes	33.0%	537	53.7%	873
Jackson	38.6%	505	49.8%	652
Jefferson	29.4%	197	51.7%	347
Johnston	24.8%	260	57.8%	606
Kay	38.5%	1,288	53.5%	1,791
Kingfisher	33.2%	268	58.5%	472
Kiowa	34.8%	331	54.0%	514
Latimer	31.2%	499	53.3%	852
Le Flore	33.1%	1,498	50.5%	2,283
Lincoln	38.5%	1,161	53.8%	1,623
Logan	42.1%	1,314	52.7%	1,645
Love	32.0%	314	51.1%	502
Major	34.7%	140	53.2%	215
Marshall	30.3%	400	56.0%	738
Mayes	40.0%	1,659	51.7%	2,144
McClain	35.4%	1,157	57.1%	1,865
McCurtain	28.3%	712	52.3%	1,314
McIntosh	40.2%	1,022	49.6%	1,261
Murray	32.7%	544	54.6%	909
Muskogee	44.8%	3,381	46.6%	3,515
Noble	35.3%	362	54.8%	562
Nowata	38.2%	406	49.9%	530
Okfuskee	36.9%	421	52.3%	1,261
Oklahoma	50.1%	34,255	47.4%	32,368
Okmulgee	45.7%	1,867	46.1%	1,882
Osage	47.5%	2,390	46.2%	2,327
Ottawa	39.3%	972	50.1%	1,238
Pawnee	40.5%	603	51.1%	762
Payne	38.9%	2,622	56.7%	3,829
Pittsburg	31.6%	1,717	55.8%	3,026
Pontotoc	29.6%	1,186	59.8%	2,392
Pottawatomie	37.5%	2,300	55.5%	3,400
Pushmataha	26.7%	317	56.1%	667
Roger Mills	21.6%	100	58.0%	268
Rogers	39.6%	2,810	52.9%	3,757
Seminole	36.0%	932	50.1%	1,194
Sequoyah	36.0%	1,359	49.6%	1,872
Stephens	31.2%	1,174	56.1%	2,108
Texas	31.7%	267	46.7%	393
Tillman	33.2%	214	53.7%	346
Tulsa	47.4%	25,372	49.6%	26,525
Wagoner	43.5%	2,493	49.1%	2,813
Washington	42.4%	1,649	51.6%	2,006
Washita	25.1%	292	60.1%	700
Woods	33.8%	217	56.5%	363
Woodward	30.8%	343	62.4%	694
Total	41.5%	139,338	51.9%	174,054

== Analysis ==
As he had managed in other primarily white Great Plains states including neighboring Kansas, Bernie Sanders won a convincing ten-point victory in Oklahoma. This marked a clear difference from 2008 when Hillary Clinton had won the state by 21 points against Barack Obama, winning 76 of the state's 77 counties. According to exit polls, Sanders won men 60–33, younger voters 76–23, white voters 56–36, and Independent voters 69–21. Clinton, for her part, won women 48–46, older voters 50–41, non-white voters 56–40, and Democrats 52–43. A majority of voters in the primary said they thought Clinton was not honest or trustworthy, 51–47.

Sanders swept 75 of Oklahoma's 77 counties. He performed strongly in the major cities of Norman, Stillwater, Enid, and Moore. He narrowly edged out Clinton in Tulsa County by a margin of 2.28%. Clinton narrowly won in Oklahoma County (the only county to vote for Obama in the 2008 primary), home to Oklahoma City, and Osage County, home of the Osage Native American tribe.

Sanders won most of the rural, majority white and deeply conservative counties of the state, including those in the Oklahoma Panhandle, Little Dixie, and Southwestern Oklahoma which are among the most radically conservative areas of the nation. The Little Dixie region in particular was the base of President Bill Clinton's support in the 1992 and 1996 elections, as this area consists of socially conservative but economically liberal Democrats, many of whom were drawn to Sanders's opposition to trade deals like NAFTA.
