= 2016 Virginia Democratic presidential primary =

- March 1, 2016

Candidate	Hillary Clinton	Bernie Sanders
Home state	New York	Vermont
Delegate count	62	33
Popular vote	504,741	276,370
Percentage	64.29%	35.20%
- Results by county and independent city Clinton: 50-60% 60-70% 70-80% 80-90% >90% Sanders: 50-60% 60-70% 70-80%

The 2016 Virginia Democratic presidential primary took place on March 1 in the U.S. state of Virginia as one of the Democratic Party's primaries ahead of the 2016 presidential election.

On the same day, dubbed "Super Tuesday," Democratic primaries were held in ten other states plus American Samoa, while the Republican Party held primaries in eleven states including their own Virginia primary.

== Opinion polling ==
Poll source	Date	1st	2nd	Other
Primary results	March 1, 2016	Hillary Clinton; 64.3%	Bernie Sanders; 35.2%	Other 0.5%
SurveyMonkey Margin of error: ? Sample size: 908	February 22–29, 2016	Hillary Clinton; 57%	Bernie Sanders; 36%	Others / Undecided; 7%
YouGov/CBS News Margin of error: 9.2% Sample size: 471	February 22–26, 2016	Hillary Clinton; 59%	Bernie Sanders; 39%	Others / Undecided; 2%
Monmouth Margin of error: ± 5.6% Sample size: 302	February 22–24, 2016	Hillary Clinton; 60%	Bernie Sanders; 33%	Others / Undecided; 7%
Roanoke College Margin of error: ± 4.8% Sample size: 415	February 16–24, 2016	Hillary Clinton; 50%	Bernie Sanders; 33%	Others / Undecided; 17%
Public Policy Polling Margin of error: ± 4.4; Sample size: 500	February 14–16, 2016	Hillary Clinton; 56%	Bernie Sanders; 34%	
Christopher Newport University Margin of error: ± 4.3% Sample size: 735	February 3–14, 2016	Hillary Clinton; 52%	Bernie Sanders; 40%	Others / Undecided; 8%

Polls in 2015

Poll source	Date	1st	2nd	3rd	Other
University of Mary Washington Registered voters: Margin of error: ± 3.9% Sample size: 357; Likely voters: Margin of error: ± 4.3% Sample size: 276	November 4–9, 2015	Hillary Clinton; 58% (RV); 63% (LV)	Bernie Sanders; 32% (RV); 27% (LV)	Martin O'Malley; 4% (RV); 5% (LV)	Don't know/None/Refused/Wouldn't vote in that primary 7% (RV); 5% (LV)
Christopher Newport University Margin of error: ± 5.1% Sample size: 407	September 29 –October 8, 2015	Hillary Clinton; 40%	Bernie Sanders; 23%	Joe Biden; 23%	Jim Webb 5%, Martin O'Malley 2%, Lincoln Chafee <1%, Someone Else 1%, Undecided/Don't Know/Refused 5%
Public Policy Polling Margin of error: ± 4.9% Sample size: 409	July 13–15, 2015	Hillary Clinton; 64%	Bernie Sanders; 14%	Jim Webb; 8%	Lincoln Chafee 5%, Martin O'Malley 2%, Not sure 7%
Christopher Newport University Margin of error: ± ? Sample size: ?	April 13–24, 2015	Hillary Clinton; 80%	Jim Webb; 6%	Joe Biden; 5%	Bernie Sanders 2%, Martin O'Malley 1%, Lincoln Chafee<1%, Someone else 2%, Undecided 3%
Christopher Newport University Margin of error: ± ? Sample size: ?	January 30 – February 10, 2015	Hillary Clinton; 65%	Jim Webb; 10%	Joe Biden; 8%	Elizabeth Warren 8%, Deval Patrick 2%, Bernie Sanders 2%, Andrew Cuomo 1%, Martin O'Malley 1%, Someone else 1%, Undecided 2%

Polls in 2014

Poll source	Date	1st	2nd	3rd	Other
Christopher Newport University Margin of error: ± 5% Sample size: 391	February 23–28, 2014	Hillary Clinton; 66%	Joe Biden; 19%	Elizabeth Warren; 7%	Undecided 9%

Polls in 2013

Poll source	Date	1st	2nd	3rd	Other
University of Mary Washington Margin of error: ±? Sample size: ?	September 25–29, 2013	Hillary Clinton; 34%	Mark Warner; 16%	Joe Biden; 9%	Elizabeth Warren 3%, Andrew Cuomo 2%, Martin O'Malley 1%, None 12%, Don't know 17%
Public Policy Polling Margin of error: ±5.2% Sample size: 357	July 11–14, 2013	Hillary Clinton; 51%	Joe Biden; 14%	Mark Warner; 11%	Elizabeth Warren 6%, Cory Booker 4%, Martin O'Malley 3%, Andrew Cuomo 2%, Brian Schweitzer 1%, Kirsten Gillibrand 0%, Someone else/Undecided 8%
Public Policy Polling Margin of error: ± 4.8% Sample size: 421	May 24–26, 2013	Hillary Clinton; 56%	Joe Biden; 14%	Mark Warner; 11%	Andrew Cuomo 3%, Elizabeth Warren 3%, Kirsten Gillibrand 1%, Martin O'Malley 1%, Deval Patrick 0%, Brian Schweitzer 0%, Someone else/Undecided 10%
University of Mary Washington Margin of error: ±? Sample size: ?	March 20–24, 2013	Hillary Clinton; 38%	Mark Warner; 18%	Joe Biden; 10%	Andrew Cuomo 3%, Martin O'Malley 3%, Other 1%, None 12%, Don't know 12%

== Results ==
Primary date: March 1, 2016
National delegates: 95

Virginia Democratic primary, March 1, 2016
Candidate	Popular vote		Estimated delegates		
Candidate	Count	Percentage	Pledged	Unpledged	Total
Hillary Clinton	504,741	64.29%	62	13	75
Bernie Sanders	276,370	35.20%	33	0	33
Martin O'Malley (withdrawn)	3,930	0.50%			
Uncommitted	—N/a		0	1	1
Total	785,041	100%	95	14	109

=== Results by county/Independent cities ===
County	Clinton	Votes	Sanders	Votes
Accomack	72.0%	1,790	27.4%	682
Albemarle	54.6%	8,288	45.0%	6,844
Alexandria	69.5%	16,310	29.9%	7,031
Alleghany	63.3%	433	36.0%	246
Amelia	78.8%	671	21.0%	179
Amherst	65.2%	1,044	34.1%	546
Appomattox	67.0%	448	32.1%	215
Arlington	66.8%	25,582	32.8%	12,566
Augusta	48.0%	1,639	51.4%	1,754
Bath	63.0%	148	36.6%	86
Bedford	56.5%	1,876	42.9%	1,424
Bland	51.7%	125	47.1%	114
Botetourt	55.7%	888	43.6%	695
Bristol	56.3%	428	42.6%	324
Brunswick	89.7%	1,354	10.1%	153
Buchanan	70.3%	523	28.4%	211
Buckingham	76.6%	902	23.1%	272
Buena Vista	58.2%	142	41.0%	100
Campbell	65.8%	1,299	33.8%	667
Caroline	74.2%	1,902	25.1%	642
Carroll	57.1%	601	42.4%	446
Charles City	85.6%	864	14.0%	141
Charlotte	79.1%	162	20.2%	162
Charlottesville	46.3%	3,889	53.4%	4,483
Chesapeake	74.1%	16,133	25.5%	5,558
Chesterfield	66.0%	22,617	33.6%	11,514
Clarke	51.4%	625	47.7%	581
Colonia Heights	55.8%	407	43.4%	316
Covington	73.6%	237	25.5%	82
Craig	51.1%	113	48.0%	106
Culpeper	54.7%	1,421	44.4%	1,154
Cumberland	79.9%	639	19.8%	158
Danville	79.9%	2,677	19.6%	656
Dickenson	60.0%	346	38.7%	223
Dinwiddie	83.3%	1,935	16.2%	375
Emporia	88.7%	407	10.9%	50
Essex	82.1%	643	17.1%	134
Fairfax (City)	59.4%	1,841	40.2%	1,246
Fairfax (County)	63.0%	88,147	36.4%	50,930
Falls Church	61.2%	1,588	38.5%	1,000
Fauquier	54.5%	2,860	44.7%	2,345
Floyd	29.6%	396	70.1%	936
Fluvanna	57.6%	1,355	41.8%	984
Franklin	86.9%	804	12.4%	115
Franklin	62.6%	1,675	36.6%	980
Frederick	50.1%	2,114	49.1%	2,072
Fredericksburg	52.7%	1,400	46.7%	1,241
Galax	57.9%	129	41.3%	92
Giles	55.7%	405	43.6%	317
Gloucester	59.1%	1,448	40.5%	993
Goochland	71.5%	1,574	28.3%	624
Grayson	49.3%	265	50.0%	269
Greene	48.7%	579	50.8%	603
Greensville	87.7%	832	11.9%	113
Halifax	80.8%	1,756	18.6%	403
Hampton	77.9%	13,542	21.7%	3,770
Hanover	59.9%	4,916	39.7%	3,255
Harrisonburg	33.6%	1,482	66.1%	2,914
Henrico	69.8%	28,170	29.7%	11,994
Henry	72.7%	1,810	26.7%	664
Highland	49.4%	86	50.6%	88
Hopewell	77.4%	1,177	22.2%	337
Isle of Wight	73.9%	2,449	25.7%	853
James City	65.1%	5,213	34.3%	2,752
King and Queen	78.7%	477	20.8%	126
King George	59.4%	916	39.7%	612
King William	72.0%	843	26.9%	315
Lancaster	74.4%	823	24.8%	275
Lee	63.5%	317	34.1%	170
Lexington	61.2%	403	37.9%	250
Loudoun	58.6%	21,180	40.8%	14,730
Louisa	65.5%	1,630	34.1%	849
Lunenburg	83.5%	736	16.0%	141
Lynchburg	61.6%	3,105	38.2%	1,923
Madison	59.1%	538	40.7%	370
Manassas	58.0%	1,813	41.1%	1,284
Manassas Park	57.4%	581	42.2%	427
Martinsville	75.3%	834	23.8%	264
Mathews	63.2%	435	35.9%	247
Mecklenburg	80.3%	1,589	19.2%	379
Middlesex	64.4%	509	35.4%	280
Montgomery	40.7%	3,507	59.0%	5,090
Nelson	56.2%	992	43.1%	761
New Kent	67.8%	951	31.4%	440
Newport News	73.0%	4,553	26.6%	4,553
Norfolk	69.2%	15,760	30.5%	6,936
Northampton	72.5%	868	27.1%	324
Northumberland	75.1%	823	24.2%	265
Norton	53.8%	86	45.0%	72
Nottoway	78.1%	829	21.1%	224
Orange	59.9%	1,322	39.4%	870
Page	53.4%	411	46.0%	353
Patrick	48.9%	361	50.3%	372
Petersburg	85.4%	4,100	14.3%	688
Pittsylvania	75.2%	2,371	24.3%	766
Poquoson	46.5%	295	52.8%	335
Portsmouth	78.5%	9,469	21.1%	2,541
Powhatan	64.4%	1,079	35.3%	592
Prince Edward	75.9%	1,366	23.3%	420
Prince George	77.7%	1,994	22.1%	566
Prince William	63.9%	26,443	35.5%	14,701
Pulaski	58.3%	837	41.0%	588
Radford	41.6%	472	57.7%	655
Richmond (City)	60.6%	21,828	39.2%	14,117
Richmond (County)	80.1%	333	19.2%	80
Roanoke (City)	59.0%	4,784	40.8%	3,302
Roanoke (County)	54.3%	3,325	45.1%	2,761
Rockbridge	57.1%	902	42.8%	676
Rockingham	47.0%	1,735	52.6%	1,943
Russell	59.9%	557	38.8%	361
Salem	50.9%	765	48.4%	727
Scott	56.2%	305	42.9%	233
Shenandoah	50.5%	960	48.8%	929
Smyth	58.7%	527	40.2%	361
Southampton	83.8%	1,199	15.1%	216
Spotsylvania	60.4%	5,399	38.9%	3,480
Stafford	60.9%	6,439	38.2%	4,042
Staunton	44.8%	1,115	54.8%	1,365
Suffolk	79.5%	7,537	20.0%	1,895
Surry	81.8%	812	17.5%	174
Sussex	90.5%	957	9.3%	98
Tazewell	57.6%	683	40.6%	481
Virginia Beach	63.1%	22,362	36.6%	12,983
Warren	48.0%	942	51.4%	1,008
Washington	54.1%	1,185	45.0%	984
Waynesboro	50.3%	788	49.0%	769
Westmoreland	74.5%	879	25.0%	295
Williamsburg	49.0%	1,159	50.7%	1,199
Winchester	50.9%	950	48.4%	903
Wise	46.8%	519	52.3%	579
Whythe	55.3%	529	44.2%	423
York	61.4%	3,292	38.1%	2,041
Total	64.3%	504,741	35.2%	276,370

== Analysis ==
After losing the state badly to Barack Obama in 2008, Hillary Clinton won Virginia by 29 points against Bernie Sanders in 2016. Her victory was primarily delivered by African Americans who backed Clinton 84-16, and women, who backed Clinton over Sanders by a margin of 70-30. Clinton also won the white vote in Virginia, 57-42, which comprised 63% of the electorate in the State. Clinton swept all income levels and educational attainment levels.

Clinton won most of the major cities in Virginia. She won Alexandria and Fairfax by a wide margin. She also won the D.C. suburbs as a whole, 65-35. This region has a large population of college-educated whites as well as African Americans. Clinton won the Northern Virginia Exurbs 60-40. She performed well in more rural Central Virginia and western Virginia including the Shenandoah Valley, winning 54-43 over Bernie Sanders and carrying the city of Roanoke. Clinton also won the eastern region of Virginia, including the major city of Richmond, by a margin of 66-34. She won in the Tidewater region of Virginia 72-28.
