= Nevada presidential caucuses =

Electoral event

The Nevada presidential caucuses are an electoral event in which citizens met in precinct caucuses to elect delegates to the corresponding county conventions. In 2021, Harry Reid (former senator to NV) passed legislation (AB321) to include primaries in hopes of increasing voter turn-out. Nevada has for decades and still does have a caucus. The caucus is where the delegates receive the votes that will be carried to the National Convention and not the primaries. There are 17 counties in Nevada and the state has 26 delegates. The Nevada caucuses began in 1981. The Kerry/Dean caucus was held on February 14, 2004. In 2008 the DNC gave Nevada the official first in the west status reflecting the growing importance of the West as well as Nevada's electoral bellwether status. The 2008 Nevada caucuses were the third major electoral event in the nominating process for President of the United States. In 2016, the Democratic caucus was held on February 20 and the Republican caucus was held on February 23.

== History ==
Prior to 1981, Nevada usually held primary elections, not caucuses, to choose delegates for the Democratic and Republican national convention. In both cases, these delegates then choose party nominees for the general presidential election. Many parties have held state level caucuses since the 1960s; however, 2008 was the first time both the Democratic and Republican parties held caucuses throughout the local (precinct), county, and state levels.

While many states hold primary elections, relatively few states hold statewide, multilevel caucuses. Party leaders and state officials believed that switching from a primary election to a caucus would streamline Nevada's move to becoming an early contender in the nomination process. As a result of switching from a late presidential primary to an early caucus, Nevada has gained electoral prominence.

Historically, New Hampshire's primary and Iowa's caucus have shared the electoral limelight, marking the beginning of the presidential campaign season. America's increasing ethnic diversity, urbanization, and geographic redistribution made influential political leaders come to the realization that New Hampshire and Iowa were not representative of the United States. Following the 2004 election, Senate Majority Leader Harry Reid began making a case for Nevada as the perfect American microcosm. Nevada's western location, significant minority population, and strong labor population demonstrating America's shifting population contributed to this illustration.

Since 2008, the Nevada caucuses have been scheduled early in the nomination process (prior to Super Tuesday). By being one of the earlier states, most importantly, the first in the West, to hold elections of any sort, the state of Nevada has been placed in the national spotlight. Nevada has become the first state to vote in the West, the first primarily labor-based state to vote, and the first state with a substantial Hispanic population to vote. Nevadans have gained electoral prominence as a direct result of switching from a late presidential primary to an early caucus.

== Process ==
The Nevada caucuses operate very differently from the more common primary election used by most other states (see U.S. presidential primary). The caucuses are generally defined as "gatherings of neighbors." Rather than going to polls and casting ballots, Nevadans gather at set locations throughout the state's precincts. The meetings occur in various locations: schools, churches, public libraries, casinos, and even individual homes. The caucuses are held every four years to determine whom Nevada's delegates will support in choosing Republican and Democratic presidential candidates.

In addition to the voting and the presidential preference choices, caucus-goers may begin the process of writing their parties’ platforms by introducing resolutions, but most of that is not dealt with until the state convention level.

Unlike in a primary, the Nevada caucus does not result directly in national delegates for each candidate. Instead, caucus-goers elect delegates to county conventions, who, in turn, elect delegates to state conventions, where Nevada's national convention delegates are selected.

The process is rather similar to the better-known Iowa caucuses, which are the first caucuses to occur in the nation. The Republicans and Democrats each hold their own set of caucuses. Participants in each party's caucuses must be registered with that party. The caucuses are subject to their own particular rules, which are subject to change from time to time.

=== Democratic Party process ===
The Nevada Democratic Party caucus is a closed caucus. However, "Any person who is eligible to vote in the state of Nevada and will be at least 18 years old on Election Day, November 3, 2020, may participate... Voters may register or change party affiliation on Caucus Day or at their in-person early vote location."

As with other Democratic caucuses, voters gathered into preference groups for each candidate. A minimum threshold of 15 percent was required in each precinct in order to achieve viability. If a candidate's preference group was not viable, voters could choose to caucus with another group or to be uncommitted. Unlike the Iowa Caucus, "raiding" of other, already viable caucus groups, was prohibited. This has changed in 2020, in that neither caucus allows raiding. Delegates to the county convention are then selected amongst the candidate groups. A similar process occurred at the county convention; although they file statements of support for their chosen candidate, all delegates are technically unbound until the state convention.

The 2008 Nevada Democratic Party caucus, in addition to the 1,754 neighborhood caucus locations, held nine at-large caucus locations. These locations were made available for shift workers, who could not return to their home precincts to caucus. The at-large precincts were at the Wynn, Bellagio, The Mirage, Paris Las Vegas, New York-New York, Flamingo, Caesars Palace, and The Rio, all located in Clark County. Workers who worked within 2.5 mi (4.0 km) of the caucus site and were scheduled to work during or within one hour of the caucus period, and had an employer ID showing their employment in the zone were permitted to attend. Unlike regular caucuses where delegates are apportioned based on registered voters, the at-large locations were allocated based on attendance, which caused controversy.

In 2012, the general expectation was that, with President Barack Obama having the advantage of incumbency and being the only viable candidate running, the race would be primarily pro forma. The process ran essentially the same as it had in 2008, and voter turnout was extremely low.

In both 2008 and 2012, the Nevada Democratic Party reported county convention delegate totals to the media and not actual votes, as the Iowa Democratic Party did in its caucus.

=== Republican Party process ===
The Nevada Republican Party caucus is a closed caucus with eligibility limited to those registered 30 days before the caucus date including 17-year-olds who will be eligible to vote in the November general election. As in most other Republican caucuses, there are two components. First, delegates are elected from the attendees to represent the caucus-goers at the county conventions in March, and they generally announce who they support for president and why they should go to the county convention. Election of delegates is by show of hands. Then, a supporter of each campaign speaks on behalf of their candidate. Finally, a straw poll, called a presidential preference poll, is taken of the individuals in the room. The preference poll is a secret ballot with candidate names printed on them.

Although the news media reports the results of the straw poll and assigns delegates proportionally based on it, in Nevada, it is the county conventions and the state convention which determine who actually goes to the Republican National Convention. Thus, all delegates are unbound until the state convention in April, but they generally represent the preferences expressed by fellow Republicans in the straw poll.

The 2012 Republican Party caucus combined Nevada's 1,835 precincts into 125 sites in order to ease the voting process. Voting was scheduled to occur from 9 am to 1 pm on February 4, 2012, and the results were scheduled to be announced at 5 pm.

The 2012 Nevada Republican caucuses were originally scheduled to begin on February 18, 2012, a month later than the January 19, 2008, caucuses. On September 29, 2011, the entire schedule of caucuses and primaries was disrupted, however, when it was announced that the Republican Party of Florida had decided to move up its primary to January 31, in an attempt to bring attention to its own primary contest and attract the presidential candidates to visit the state. Because of the move, the Republican National Committee decided to strip Florida of half of its delegates. Also as a result, the Nevada Republican Party, along with Iowa, New Hampshire and South Carolina, then sought to move their caucuses back into early January. All but Nevada, which agreed to follow Florida, confirmed their caucus and primary dates to take place throughout January, with Nevada deciding to hold its contest on February 4, 2012.:)

== Democratic results ==
- 2008 (January 19): Hillary Clinton (51%), Barack Obama (45%), and John Edwards (4%)
- 2012 (January 21): Barack Obama (98%) and uncommitted (1%)
- 2016 (February 20): Hillary Clinton (53%) and Bernie Sanders (47%)
- 2020 (February 22):
  - First Round Popular Vote: Bernie Sanders (34%), Joe Biden (18%), Pete Buttigieg (16%), Elizabeth Warren (13%), Amy Klobuchar (10%), Tom Steyer (9%), and Tulsi Gabbard (0%)
  - Second Round Popular Vote: Bernie Sanders (40%), Joe Biden (19%), Pete Buttigieg (17%), Elizabeth Warren (11%), Amy Klobuchar (7%), Tom Steyer (4%), and Tulsi Gabbard (0%)
  - County Convention Delegates: Bernie Sanders (47%), Joe Biden (20%), Pete Buttigieg (14%), Elizabeth Warren (10%), Tom Steyer (5%), Amy Klobuchar (4%), and Tulsi Gabbard (0%)
  - Delegates: Bernie Sanders (24), Joe Biden (9), Pete Buttigieg (3), and others (0)

== Republican results ==
- 2008 (January 19): Mitt Romney (51%), Ron Paul (14%), John McCain (13%), Mike Huckabee (8%), Fred Thompson (8%), Rudy Giuliani (4%), and Duncan Hunter (2%)
- 2012 (February 4): Mitt Romney (50%), Newt Gingrich (21%), Ron Paul (19%), and Rick Santorum (10%)
- 2016 (February 23): Donald Trump (46%), Marco Rubio (24%), Ted Cruz (21%), Ben Carson (5%), and John Kasich (4%)
- 2020: Caucuses cancelled

== 2024 ==
In 2024, Nevada will hold both primaries and caucuses:

1. The primary was on February 6, 2024, which was both the Republican and Democratic presidential preference primaries; on the other hand,
2. The caucuses are on February 8, 2024.

== Criticism ==
Caucus participants must publicly state their opinion and vote, which subjects them to peer pressure from neighbors. Another criticism involves the amount of participants' time these events consume.

A Nevada caucus may last for the greater part of a day. Absentee voting is also barred. The final criticism is the complexity of the rules in terms of how one's vote counts, as it is not a simple popular vote.

Arguments in favor of caucuses include the belief that they favor more motivated participants than simple ballots and that supporters of non-viable candidates are able to realign with a more popular candidate and still make their vote count. Additionally, many caucus-goers consider them more interesting because of how much more interactive they are than a primary. Lastly, one other argument in favor is that it is believed that caucus-goers get more information before making their vote so those voting will potentially be more educated about their candidate choices than primary-goers. The validity of this belief has not been shown to be scientifically accurate.

In 2016 Democratic Party Nevada Convention, an incident occurred involving Bernie Sanders' and Hillary Clinton's supporters in Las Vegas.

== See also ==
- 2024 Nevada Democratic presidential primary
- 2024 Nevada Republican presidential nominating contests
