= 2016 Tennessee Republican presidential primary =

- March 1, 2016

58 Republican National Convention delegates
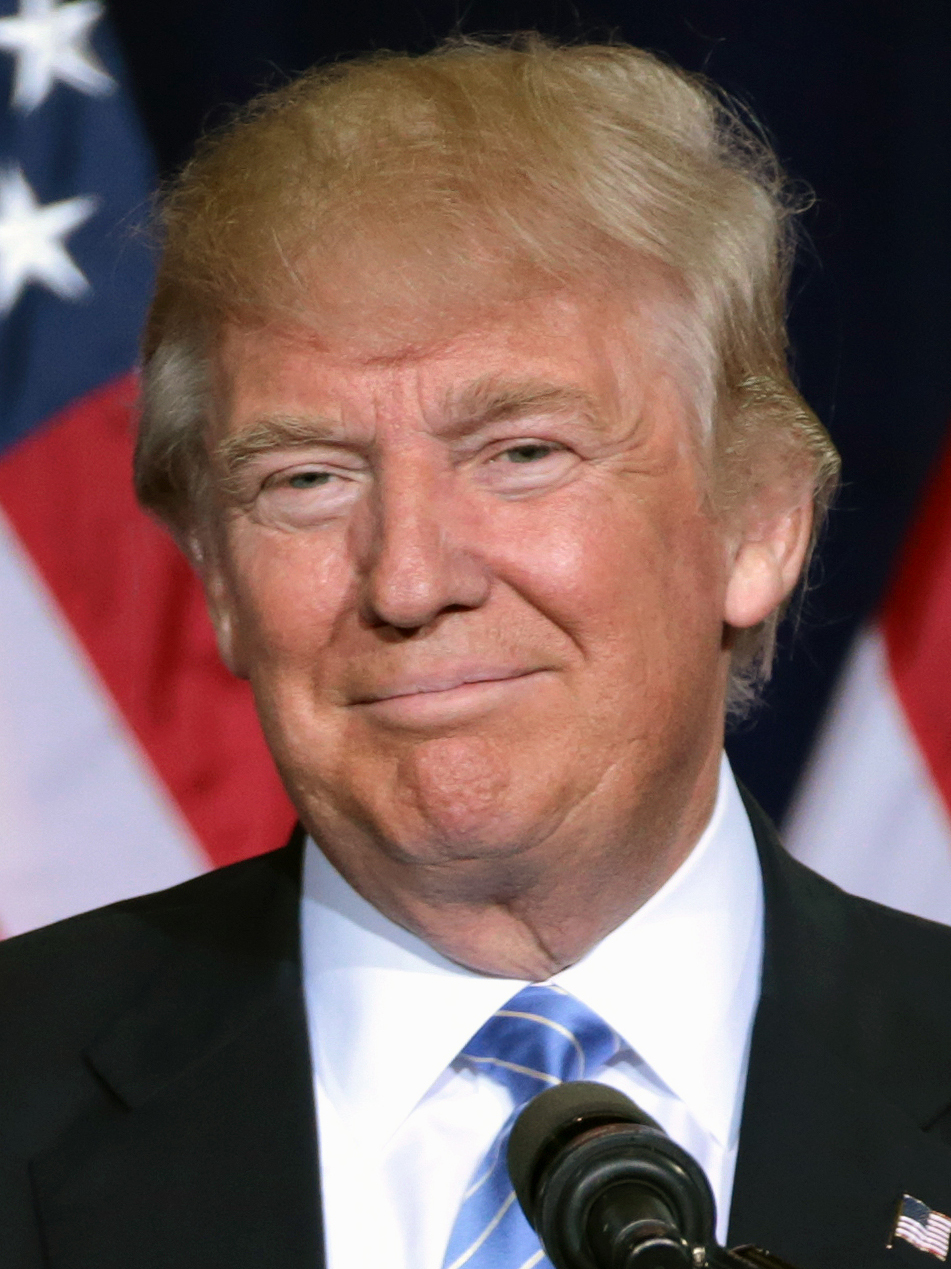

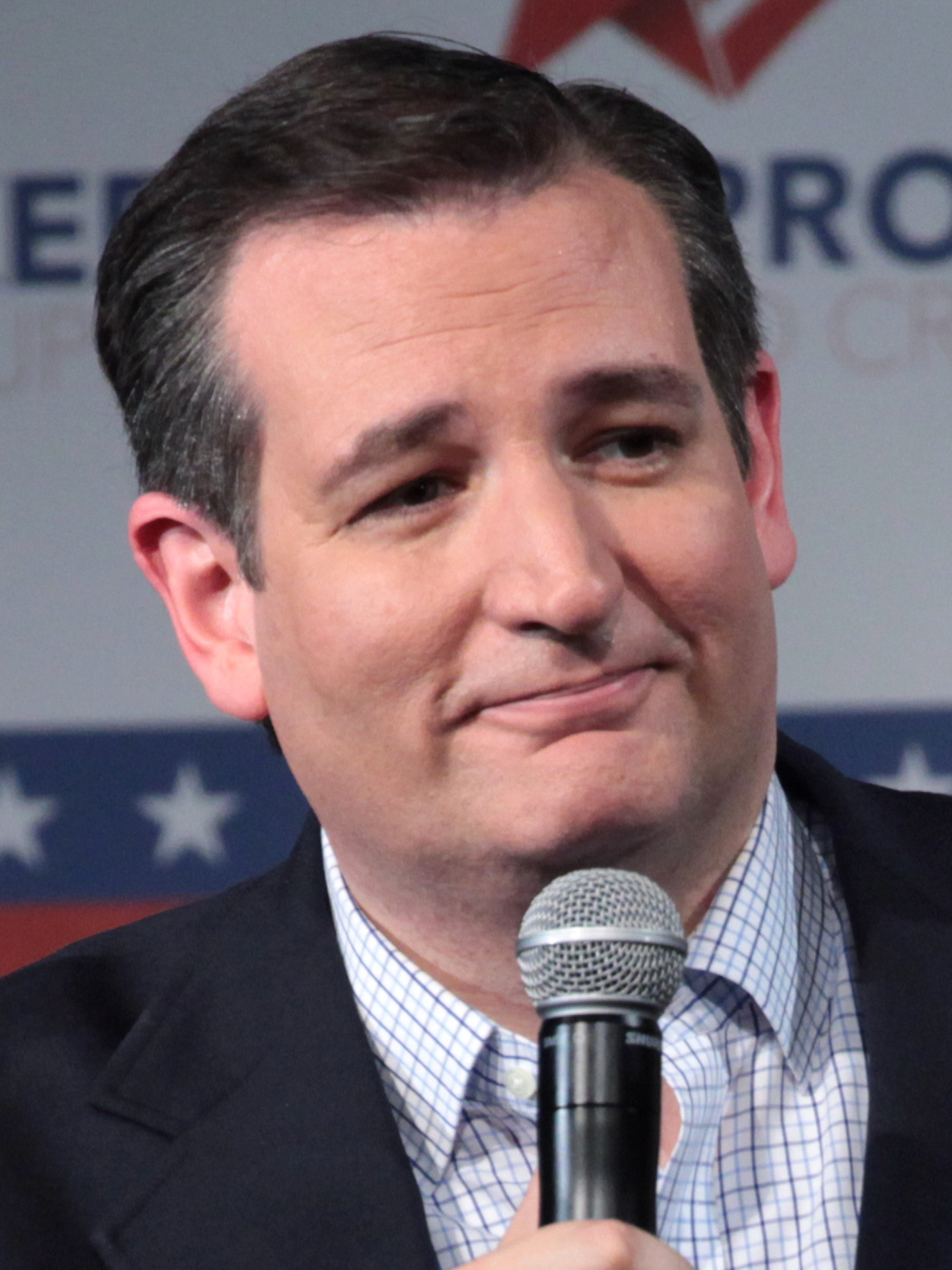

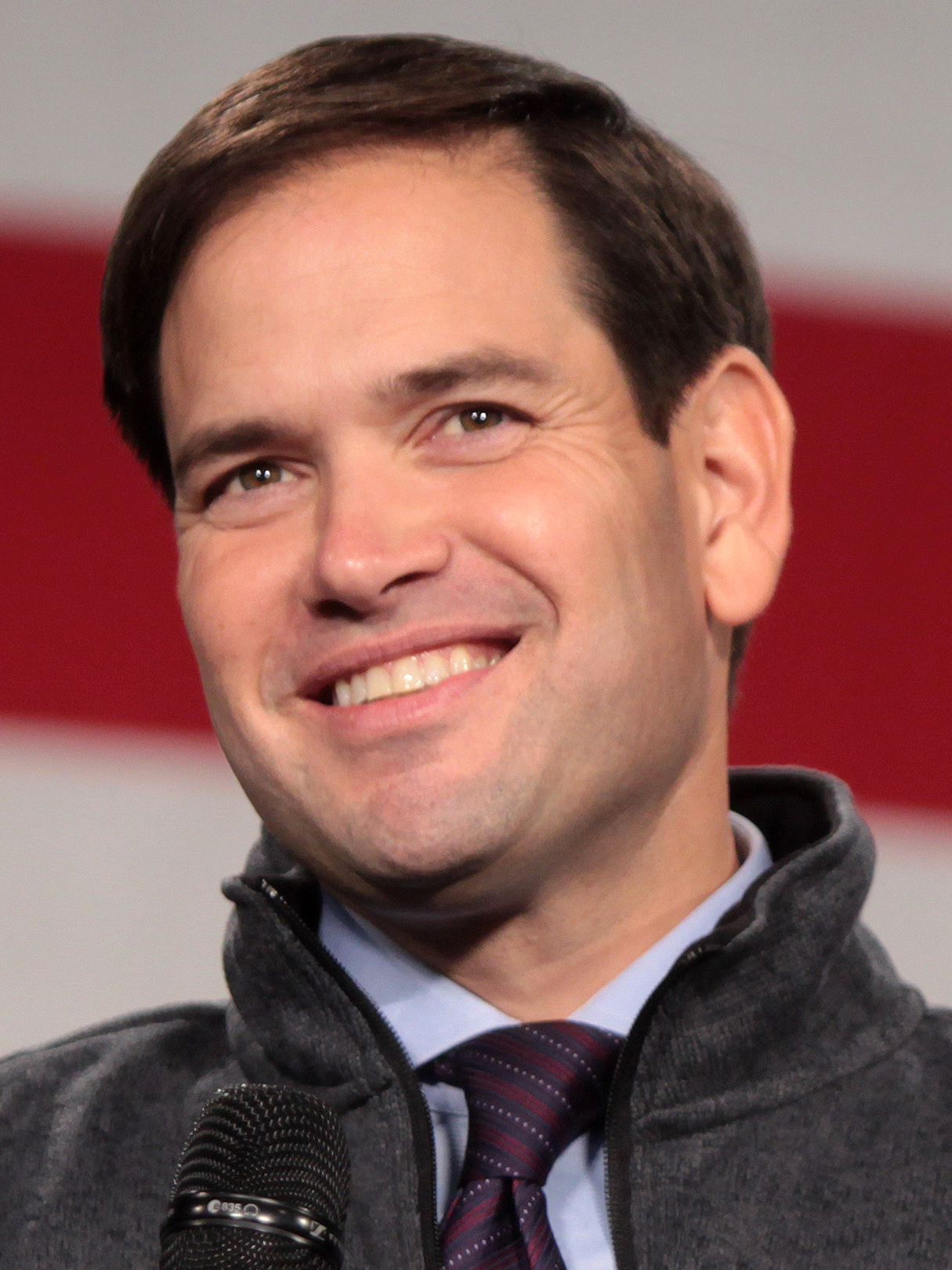

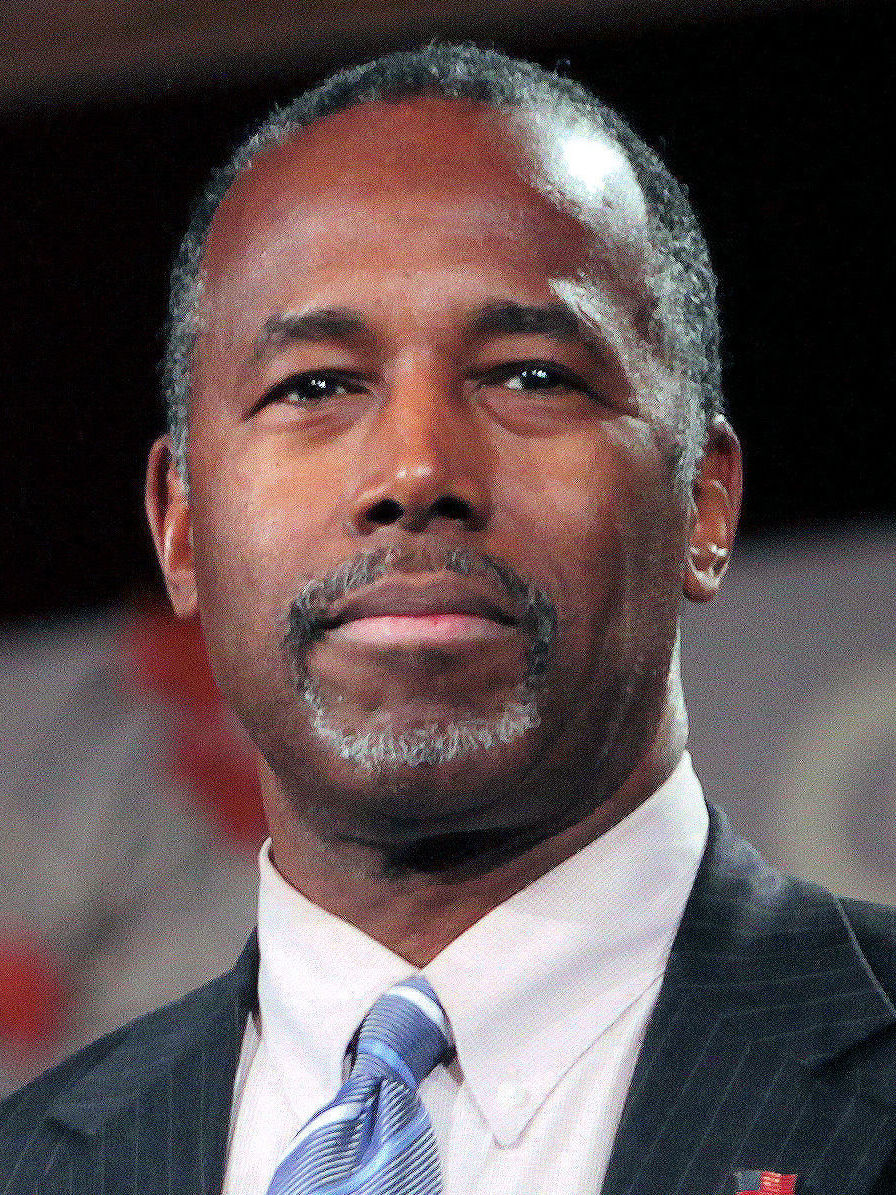

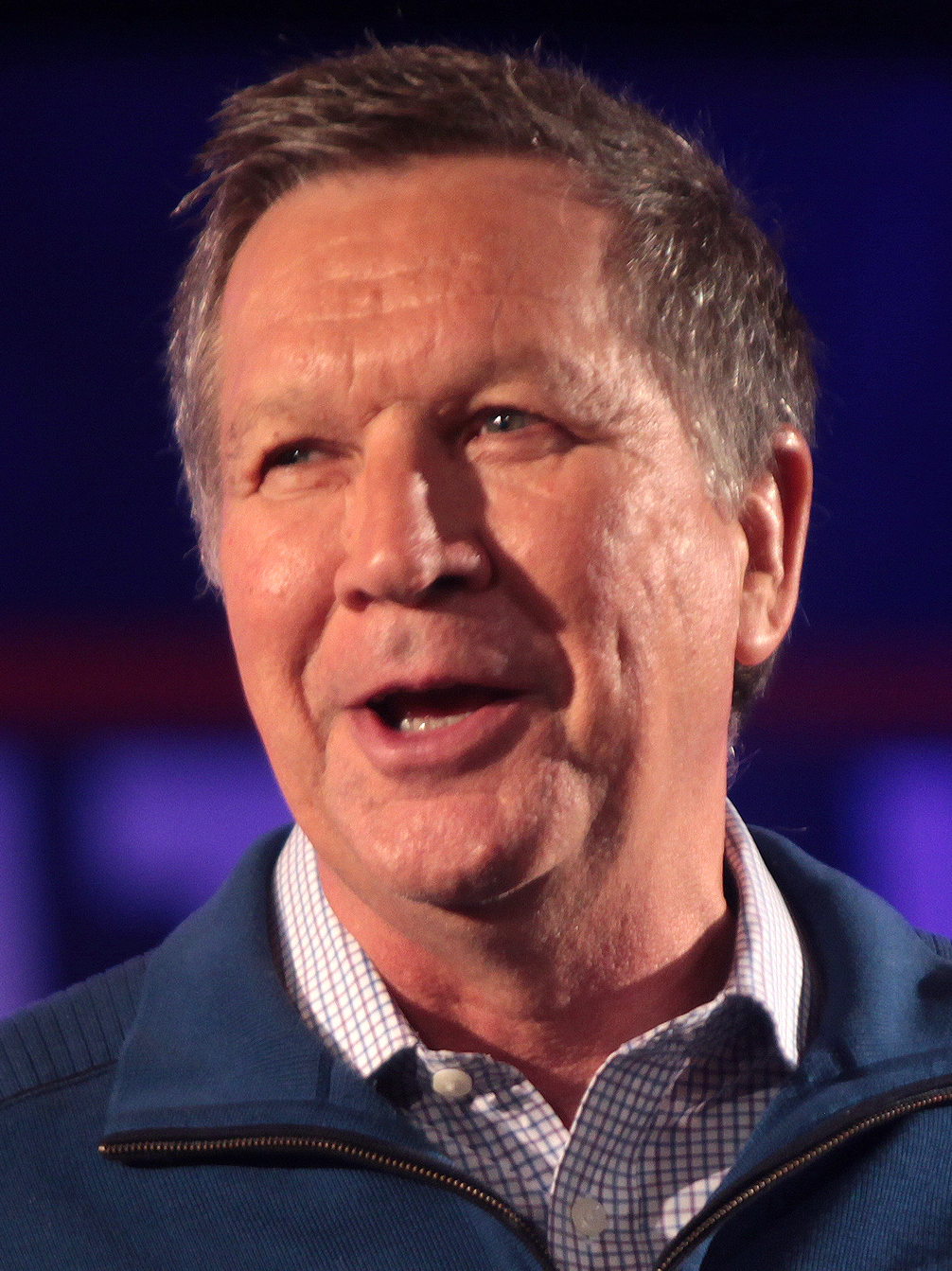
Candidate	Donald Trump	Ted Cruz	Marco Rubio
Home state	New York	Texas	Florida
Delegate count	33	16	9
Popular vote	333,180	211,471	181,274
Percentage	38.94%	24.71%	21.18%
Candidate	Ben Carson	John Kasich
Home state	Maryland	Ohio
Delegate count	0	0
Popular vote	64,951	45,301
Percentage	7.59%	5.29%

Trump
20 – 30%
30 – 40%
40 – 50%
50 – 60%
Rubio
30 – 40%

The 2016 Tennessee Republican presidential primary took place on March 1, 2016, as one of 14 contests scheduled on Super Tuesday, in the Republican Party primaries for the 2016 presidential election, following the Nevada caucuses a week before. Businessman Donald Trump won the primary with a plurality, carrying 38.94% of the vote and all but one county, awarding him 33 delegates.

Texas Senator Ted Cruz came second, with 24.71% of the vote and 16 delegates. Florida Senator Marco Rubio came third, with 21.18% of the vote and nine delegates, carrying only the county of Williamson. All other candidates did not receive any delegates.

The Democratic Party held its Tennessee primary on the same day, which was won by Hillary Clinton.

== Opinion polling ==
Primary date: March 1, 2016

Poll source	Date	1st	2nd	3rd	Other
Primary results	March 1, 2016	Donald Trump; 38.94%	Ted Cruz; 24.71%	Marco Rubio; 21.18%	Ben Carson 7.59%, John Kasich 5.29%, Jeb Bush 1.12%, Mike Huckabee 0.28%, Rand Paul 0.27%, Chris Christie 0.15%, Carly Fiorina 0.08%, Rick Santorum 0.08%, Jim Gilmore 0.03%, Lindsey Graham 0.03%, George Pataki 0.02%
SurveyMonkey Margin of error: ± ?% Sample size: 772	February 22–29, 2016	Donald Trump; 48%	Marco Rubio; 18%	Ted Cruz; 15%	Ben Carson 10%, John Kasich 5%, Undecided 4%
NBC News/Wall Street; Journal/Marist Margin of error: ± 3.8% Sample size: 665	February 22–25, 2016	Donald Trump; 40%	Ted Cruz; 22%	Marco Rubio; 19%	Ben Carson 9%, John Kasich 6%
Vanderbilt/PSRA Margin of error: 5.6% Sample size: 495	November 11–23, 2015	Donald Trump; 29%	Ben Carson; 25%	Ted Cruz; 14%	Marco Rubio 12%, Jeb Bush 6%, Carly Fiorina 2%, Undecided 7%, Other 4%, Wouldn't Vote 1%
Opinion Savvy/Insider Advantage Margin of error: 4.6% Sample size: 440	August 2–3, 2015	Donald Trump; 35.3%	Ben Carson; 14.5%	Jeb Bush; 11.7%	Mike Huckabee 6.5%, Ted Cruz 6.2%, Scott Walker 5.8%, John Kasich 3.3%, Rand Paul 3%, Marco Rubio 2.8%, Chris Christie 1.7%, Carly Fiorina 1.7%, Bobby Jindal 1.4%, Rick Santorum 0.7%, George Pataki 0.3%, Lindsey Graham 0.2%, Rick Perry 0.2%, Someone else 1.3%, Undecided 3.5%

== Results ==
Tennessee Republican primary, March 1, 2016
Candidate	Votes	Percentage	Actual delegate count		
Candidate	Votes	Percentage	Bound	Unbound	Total
Donald Trump	333,180	38.94%	33	0	33
Ted Cruz	211,471	24.71%	16	0	16
Marco Rubio	181,274	21.18%	9	0	9
Ben Carson	64,951	7.59%	0	0	0
John Kasich	45,301	5.29%	0	0	0
Jeb Bush (withdrawn)	9,551	1.12%	0	0	0
Mike Huckabee (withdrawn)	2,415	0.28%	0	0	0
Rand Paul (withdrawn)	2,350	0.27%	0	0	0
Uncommitted	1,849	0.22%	0	0	0
Chris Christie (withdrawn)	1,256	0.15%	0	0	0
Carly Fiorina (withdrawn)	715	0.08%	0	0	0
Rick Santorum (withdrawn)	710	0.08%	0	0	0
Jim Gilmore (withdrawn)	267	0.03%	0	0	0
Lindsey Graham (withdrawn)	253	0.03%	0	0	0
George Pataki (withdrawn)	186	0.02%	0	0	0
Unprojected delegates:			0	0	0
Total:	855,729	100.00%	58	0	58
Source: The Green Papers

== See also ==
- 2016 Tennessee Democratic presidential primary
- 2016 United States presidential election in Tennessee
- 2016 Tennessee elections
