= 2020 Nevada Democratic presidential caucuses =

- February 22, 2020

49 delegates (36 pledged, 13 unpledged) to the Democratic National Convention The number of pledged delegates won is determined by the number of county convention delegates (CCDs) (Note: The number of pledged national convention delegates is determined by the number of CCDs won. However, a candidate must get both at least 15% of the total vote to get statewide delegates, and at least 15% of the vote in a congressional district to get delegates from that district. Each precinct has a certain number of CCDs and allocates them based on how many caucus goers there are for each candidate at that precinct.)

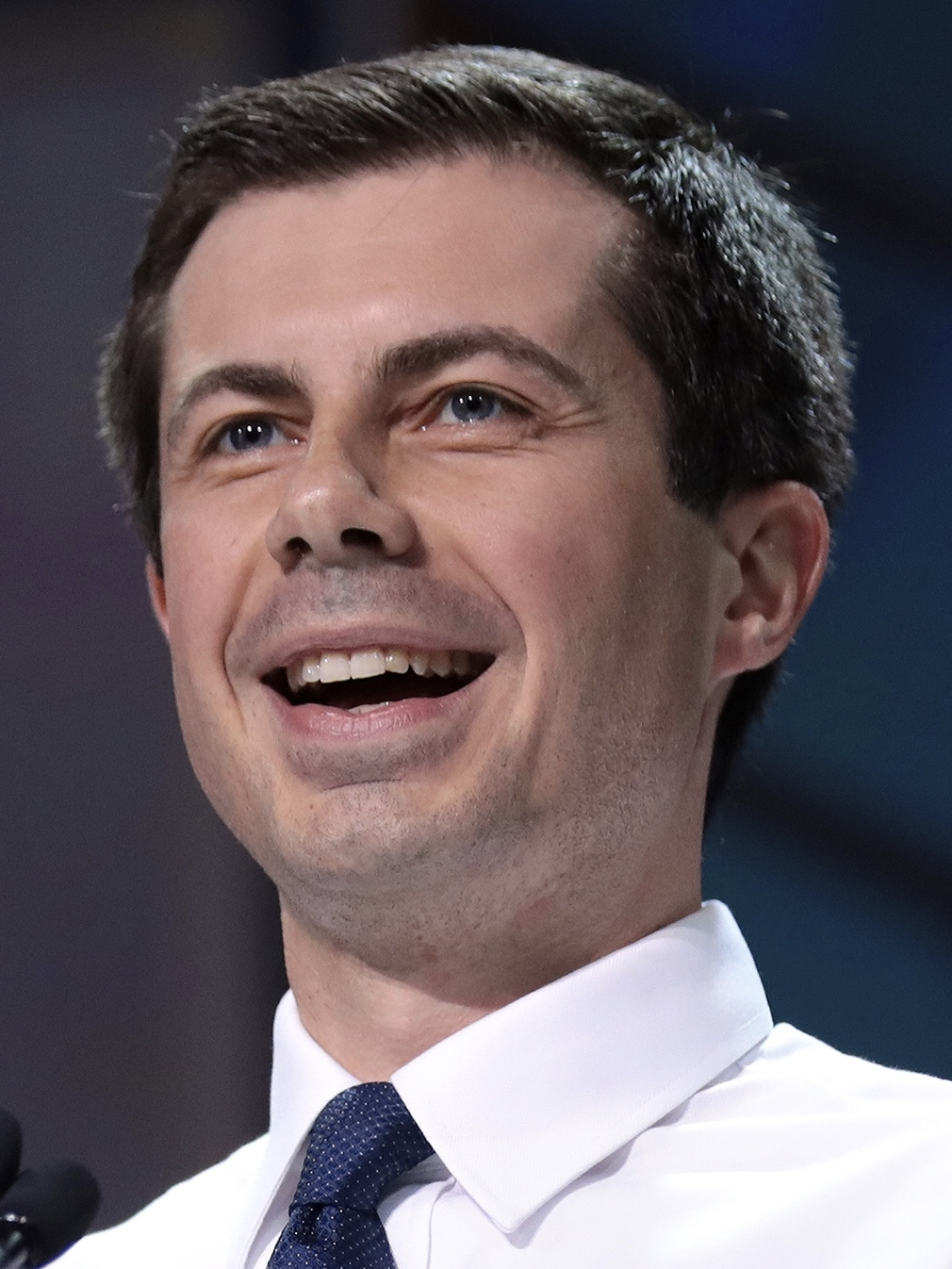

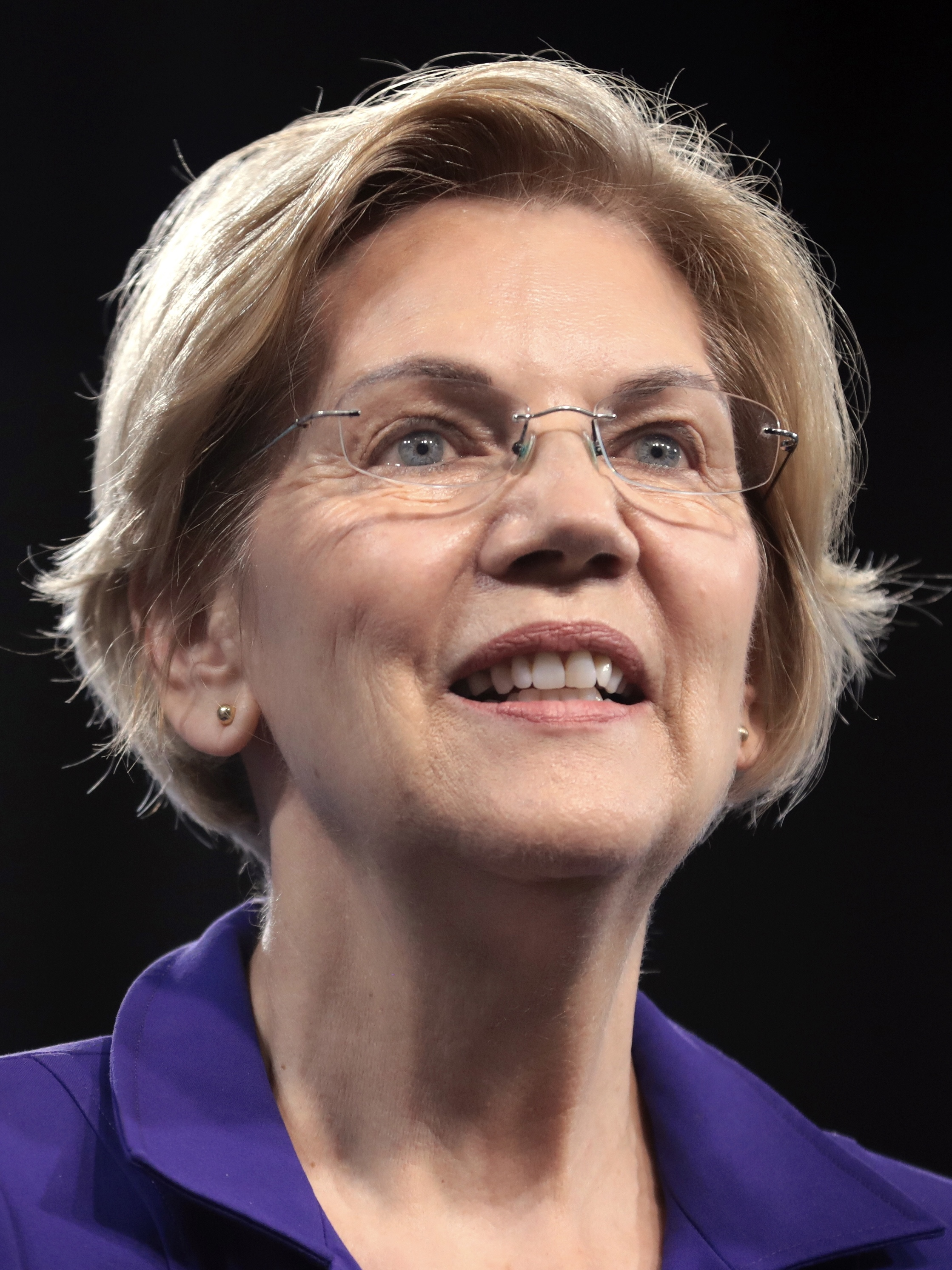

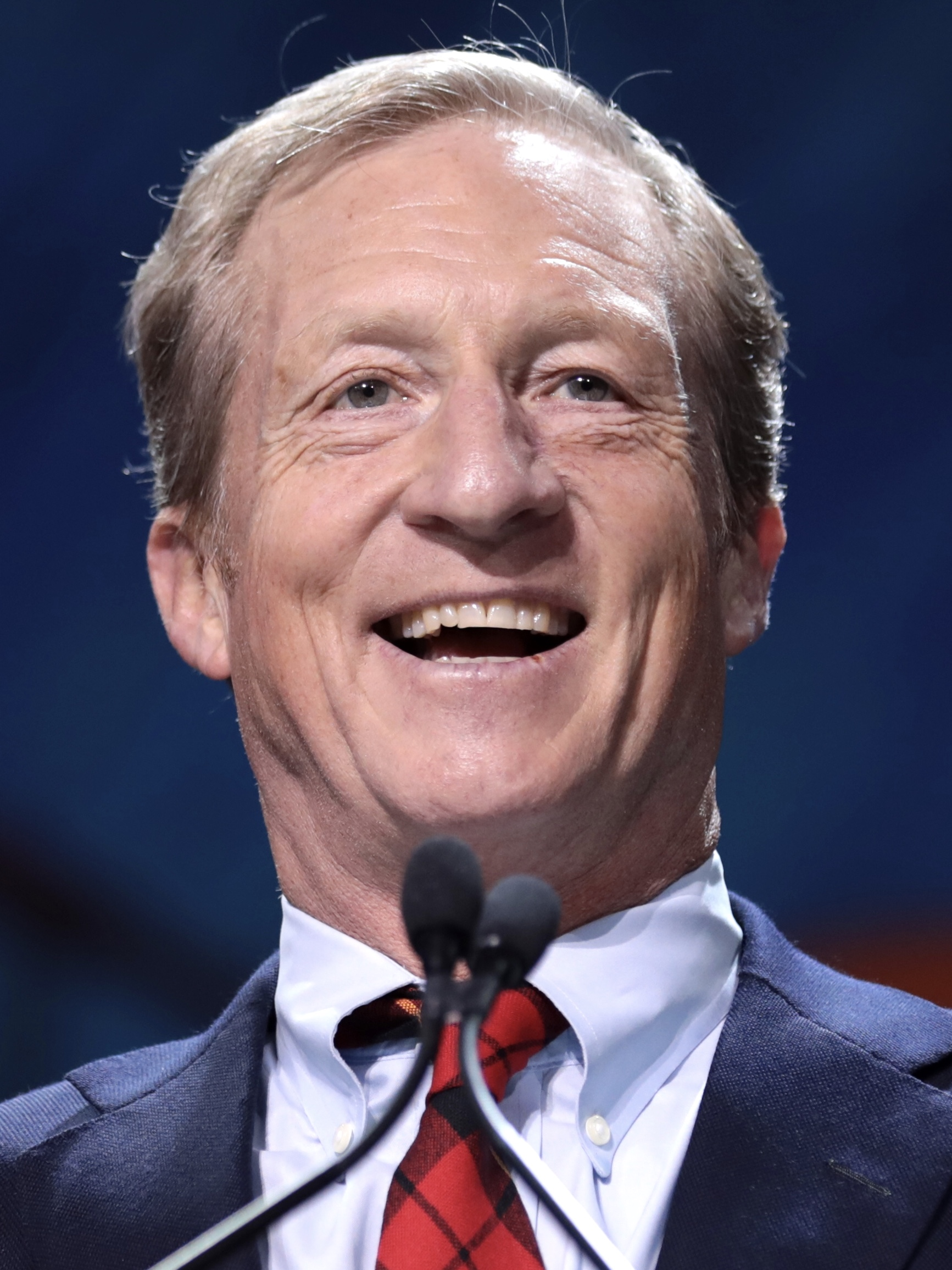

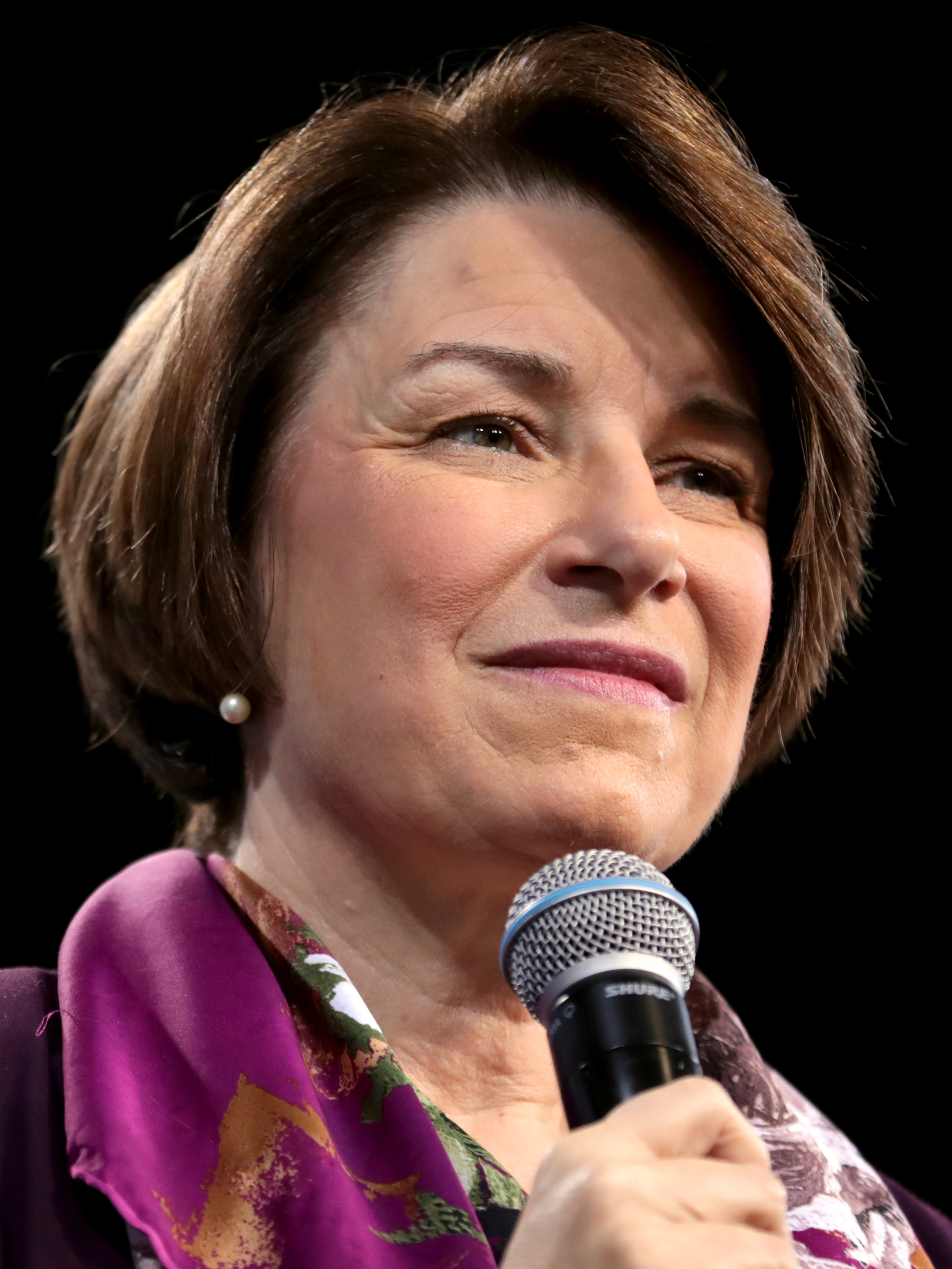
Candidate	Bernie Sanders	Joe Biden	Pete Buttigieg
Home state	Vermont	Delaware	Indiana
Delegate count	24	9	3
First vote	35,652 (34.0%)	18,424 (17.6%)	16,102 (15.4%)
Final vote (Note: Vote count after votes for candidates who did not get at least 15% of the vote in that precinct are reallocated to the voter's second choice.)	41,075 (40.5%)	19,179 (18.9%)	17,598 (17.3%)
CCDs (Note: County convention delegates (CCDs) are used to calculate how many pledged national convention delegates each candidate wins statewide and in the state's four congressional districts.)	6,788 (46.8%)	2,927 (20.2%)	2,073 (14.3%)
Candidate	Elizabeth Warren	Tom Steyer	Amy Klobuchar
Home state	Massachusetts	California	Minnesota
Delegate count	0	0	0
First vote	13,438 (12.8%)	9,503 (9.06%)	10,100 (9.63%)
Final vote	11,703 (11.5%)	4,120 (4.06%)	7,376 (7.26%)
CCDs	1,406 (9.7%)	682 (4.71%)	603 (4.16%)

Pete Buttigieg Bernie Sanders	Tom Steyer Tie

Pledged national convention delegates
Type	Del.
CD1	5
CD2	6
CD3	6
CD4	6
PLEO	5
At-large	8
Total pledged delegates	36

The 2020 Nevada Democratic presidential caucuses took place on February 22, 2020, with early voting on February 14–18, and was the third nominating contest in the Democratic Party primaries for the 2020 presidential election, following the New Hampshire primary the week before. The Nevada caucuses were a closed caucus, meaning that only registered Democrats could vote in this caucus. The state awarded 49 delegates towards the national convention, of which 36 were pledged delegates allocated on the basis of the results of the caucuses.

Senator Bernie Sanders won the caucuses in a landslide, with 46.8% of county convention delegates (CCDs) and 40.5% of the final popular vote alignment, with former vice president Joe Biden coming in second. Former mayor Pete Buttigieg and senator Elizabeth Warren failed to cross the 15% threshold of county convention delegates (CCDs) required to earn statewide delegates, although Buttigieg earned three delegates because he received at least 15% of CCDs in at least one congressional district despite falling short of the statewide threshold. This was the third presidential nominating contest in a row that Sanders topped the popular vote in, after the Iowa caucuses and the New Hampshire primary. Of the 104,883 votes, more than 70,000 were cast early with ranked choice voting ballots.

== Procedure ==
Caucus votes were initially slated to be counted on the Shadow app that caused significant problems during the counting of 2020 Iowa Democratic caucuses. As a consequence of those difficulties, the caucuses instead used Google Forms running on 2,000 iPads to send in results. Some volunteers believed there was a lack of training on the iPads, which could result in malfunctions. Early voting for the caucuses took place from February 15 to 18. In addition to Google Forms, early voters filled out a paper ballot that required them to rank candidates according to preference. Early voting ballots were only counted if voters ranked at least three candidates, and were transmitted to voter's home precincts to be counted alongside election day votes.

Precinct caucuses were held starting at 10:00 a.m. local time (PST), with voting starting at noon on February 22. In the closed caucuses, candidates had to meet a 15% viability threshold within an individual precinct in order to be considered viable and 15% at the congressional district or statewide level to win delegates, with supporters of non-viable candidates at precinct caucuses then allowed to support one of the remaining viable candidates. Of the 36 pledged delegates to the 2020 Democratic National Convention, 23 were allocated on the basis of the district results made up of the precinct caucuses, with between 5 and 6 allocated to each of the state's four congressional districts. In the same step the precinct caucuses also elected delegates to county conventions based on the results of the vote in each precinct. Of the remaining 13 pledged delegates, 5 were allocated to party leaders and elected officials (PLEO delegates) in addition to 8 at-large delegates, and these were distributed proportionally based on the number of county delegates for presidential contenders.

The county conventions were planned for April 18, 2020, to choose delegates for the state convention. On May 30, 2020, the state convention met to vote on the 36 pledged delegates for the Democratic National Convention. The delegation also included 13 unpledged PLEO delegates: 6 members of the Democratic National Committee, 5 members of Congress (both senators and 3 representatives), the governor Steve Sisolak, and former Senate Majority Leader Harry Reid. This meant that presumptive nominee Joe Biden together with the delegates he received from Buttigieg was able to get 25 votes on the national convention, one more than Sanders' 24.

On March 20, 2019, the Nevada Democratic Party had released its 2020 delegate selection plan, introducing four days for early voting from February 15 to 18, 2020, and, like the Iowa caucuses, "virtual caucuses" on February 16 and 17 to allow those unable to physically attend to vote in addition to releasing raw vote totals. In both cases, caucusgoers' ranked presidential preferences would be sent to their precinct and counted on the day of the physical caucus, but in late August 2019, the Democratic National Committee ordered both the Iowa and Nevada Democratic state parties to scrap their plans for "virtual caucuses" because of security concerns. After county conventions following the previous caucuses had left open the risk of a candidate winning a majority of delegates at the state conventions despite trailing among district delegates, even all unpledged delegates had to be allocated on the basis of the results of the precinct caucuses on February 22.

== Candidates ==
In order to get on the "caucus preference card" (ballot), candidates had to file with the State committee and pay a $2,500 fee by New Year's Day 2020. The following candidates qualified:

- Joe Biden
- Pete Buttigieg
- Tulsi Gabbard
- Amy Klobuchar
- Bernie Sanders
- Tom Steyer
- Elizabeth Warren
- Michael Bennet (withdrawn)
- Deval Patrick (withdrawn)
- Andrew Yang (withdrawn)

Cory Booker, John Delaney and Marianne Williamson were accepted onto the ballot, but withdrew soon enough that they did not appear on it. Although Delaney had not been on the ballot, he received one vote in the first caucus alignment. There was also an uncommitted option on the ballot.

== Campaign ==
Twenty-three candidates visited the state during 2019. The largest event of that year was the November 17 "First in the West" "cattle call", which was attended by fourteen candidates.

For a second caucus in a row, the Culinary Workers Union declined to endorse a candidate. This came after it circulated a flyer among members criticizing Sanders and Warren's support for single-payer healthcare, which it argued would leave members with worse benefits. The Las Vegas Sun endorsed both Klobuchar and Biden, saying that they think nominating Sanders "guarantees a Trump second term."

The following was spent on television advertising:

- Tom Steyer: $13.55 million
- Bernie Sanders: $1.54 million
- Elizabeth Warren: $1.51 million
- Pete Buttigieg: $1.26 million
- Joe Biden: $1.16 million
- Amy Klobuchar: $838,740

Even though the Republican caucus had been canceled, President Trump held several campaign events in Nevada.

=== February 14–18 primary ===
With encouragement from the remaining campaigns, the five-day early voting began on February 14. Hundreds of polling places were open throughout the state, with candidate events taking place near to them. Turnout was large, with close to 12,000 showing up the first day and greater numbers over the weekend, February 15–16. It was estimated that up to 60% of all participants would vote early and 77,000 voters took the opportunity to do so. As approximately 84,000 voters voted in the caucus in 2016, and approximately 110,000 voters voted in 2008, this put the trajectory for voter turn out in the 2020 caucus above 2016 and near 2008.

Early voters who did not fill out at least a first-choice, second-choice and third-choice ballot oval would not have their votes counted, creating concerns of lost votes, but this rule ultimately affected few voters.

=== February 19–22 caucus ===
With the early voting phase over, the ninth official debate between the candidates on the ballot took place on February 19. Steyer, who was in double digits in several polls in Nevada, did not qualify for the debate, while Michael Bloomberg, who was not on the ballot, did.

The doors opened for the caucus at 9 AM PST and the caucus itself an hour later. There was controversy about the NDAs that the people working at the caucuses were made to sign. Nevada State Democratic Party Chairman William McCurdy stated that signing the non-disclosure agreements was voluntary, but this was disputed. Several people quit rather than doing so.

== Polling ==
Polling aggregation
Source of poll aggregation	Date updated	Dates polled	Bernie Sanders	Joe Biden	Pete Buttigieg	Elizabeth Warren	Tom Steyer	Amy Klobuchar	Others	Undecided (Note: Calculated by taking the difference of 100% and all other candidates combined)
270 to Win	Feb 21, 2020	Feb 14–21, 2020	30.0%	16.7%	14.0%	13.7%	9.7%	9.7%	1.3% (Note: Gabbard with 1.3%; Bloomberg not reported)	4.9%
RealClear Politics	Feb 21, 2020	Feb 19–21, 2020	32.5%	16.0%	16.0%	14.0%	9.0%	9.5%	2.0% (Note: Gabbard with 2.0%; Bloomberg not reported)	1.0%
FiveThirtyEight	Feb 21, 2020	until Feb 21, 2020 (Note: FiveThirtyEight aggregates polls with a trendline regression of polls rather than a strict average of recent polls.)	30.5%	14.4%	15.3%	11.8%	10.2%	8.9%	11.0% (Note: Bloomberg with 9.1%; Gabbard with 1.9%)	– (Note: Individual candidate numbers add up to more than 100%)
Average			31.0%	15.7%	15.1%	13.2%	9.6%	9.4%	4.7% (Note: Bloomberg with 3.0%; Gabbard with 1.7%)	2.0%
Nevada caucus results, first alignment (February 22, 2020)			34.0%	17.6%	15.4%	12.8%	9.1%	9.6%	1.5% (Note: Uncommitted with 0.4%; Gabbard with 0.3%; Yang with 0.6%; Bennet and Patrick with 0.1%; Delaney with 0.0%)	–

– Debate qualifying poll as designated by the Democratic National Committee

Tabulation of individual polls of the 2020 Nevada Democratic Caucus
Poll source	Date(s) administered	Sample size (Note: Key: A – all adults RV – registered voters LV – likely voters V – unclear)	Margin of error	Joe Biden	Cory Booker	Pete Buttigieg	Kamala Harris	Amy Klobuchar	Beto O'Rourke	Bernie Sanders	Tom Steyer	Elizabeth Warren	Andrew Yang	Other	Undecided
Nevada caucuses (first alignment vote)	Feb 22, 2020	–	–	17.6%	–	15.4%	–	9.6%	–	34%	9.1%	12.8%	0.6%	1% (Note: Uncommitted with 0.4%; Gabbard with 0.3%; Bennet and Delaney with 0.1%; Patrick with 0%)	–
Data for Progress (Note: By the time of this poll, Data for Progress, which has worked with both the Sanders and Warren campaigns, had endorsed Warren)	Feb 19–21, 2020	1010 (LV)	± 2.8%	16%	–	15%	–	8%	–	35%	8%	16%	–	2% (Note: Gabbard with 2%)	–
AtlasIntel	Feb 19–21, 2020	517 (LV)	± 4.0%	11%	–	14%	–	5%	–	38%	11%	9%	–	7% (Note: Gabbard with 3%; "other" with 4%)	5%
Emerson College	Feb 19–20, 2020	425 (LV)	± 4.7%	16%	–	17%	–	11%	–	30%	10%	12%	–	4% (Note: Gabbard with 2%; someone else with 2%)	–
	Feb 15–18, 2020	Early voting occurred in the Nevada caucuses													
Point Blank Political	Feb 13–15, 2020	256 (LV)	± 5.6%	14.3%	–	12.6%	–	15.6%	–	13%	18.6%	7.1%	–	1.7% (Note: Gabbard with 1.7%)	17.1%
Beacon Research/Tom Steyer	Feb 12–15, 2020	600 (LV)	–	19%	–	13%	–	7%	–	24%	18%	10%	–	4% (Note: others with 4%)	6%
Data for Progress (Note: By the time of this poll, Data for Progress, which has worked with both the Sanders and Warren campaigns, had endorsed Warren)	Feb 12–15, 2020	766 (LV)	± 3.4%	14%	–	15%	–	9%	–	35%	10%	16%	–	2% (Note: Gabbard with 2%)	–
WPA Intelligence/Las Vegas Review-Journal/AARP Nevada	Feb 11–13, 2020	413 (LV)	± 4.8%	18%	–	10%	–	10%	–	25%	11%	13%	–	5% (Note: Gabbard with 0%; Other with 5%)	8%
	Feb 11, 2020	New Hampshire primary; Yang withdraws from the race after close of polls													
	Jan 13, 2020	Booker withdraws from the race													
Suffolk University/USA Today	Jan 8–11, 2020	500 (LV)	± 4.4%	19%	2%	8%	–	4%	–	18%	8%	11%	4%	4% (Note: Delaney and Gabbard with 1%; Patrick with 0%; Bennet and Williamson with no voters; other with 0%; refused with 2%)	22%
https://www.yang2020.com/wp-content/uploads/Myers-Research-Nevada.pdf	Jan 5–8, 2020	635	± 4.0%	23%	3%	6%	–	2%	–	17%	12%	12%	4%	13% (Note: Bloomberg and Gabbard with 2%; Williamson with 1%; Bennet, Delaney, and Patrick with 0%; others with 0%; none with 8%)	6%
	Dec 3, 2019	Harris withdraws from the race													
YouGov/CBS News	Nov 6–13, 2019	708 (RV)	± 4.7%	33%	2%	9%	4%	2%	–	23%	2%	21%	1%	2% (Note: Castro with 1%; Bennet, Bullock, Delaney, Gabbard, Messam, Sestak, and Williamson with 0%; "Someone else" with 1%)	–
Fox News	Nov 10–13, 2019	627	± 4.0%	24%	1%	8%	4%	2%	–	18%	5%	18%	3%	4% (Note: Gabbard with 2%; Castro with 1%; Bennet, Bullock, Delaney, Messam, Sestak and Williamson with 0%; others with 1%; none with 2%)	10%
Emerson Polling	Oct 31 – Nov 2, 2019	451 (LV)	± 4.6%	30%	1%	5%	5%	1%	–	19%	3%	22%	5%	10% (Note: Bennet, Castro, and Gabbard with 1%; Bullock, Delaney, Sestak and Williamson with 0%; someone else with 7%)	–
Mellman Group/The Nevada Independent	Oct 28 – Nov 2, 2019	600 (LV)	± 4.0%	29%	1%	7%	3%	3%	0%	19%	4%	19%	3%	3% (Note: Castro, Gabbard and Williamson with 1%; Bennet, Bullock, Delaney and Sestak with 0%)	9%
	Nov 1, 2019	O'Rourke withdraws from the race													
CNN/SSRS	Sep 22–26, 2019	324 (LV)	± 7.1%	22%	2%	4%	5%	1%	0%	22%	4%	18%	3%	3% (Note: Gabbard, Ryan, and Williamson with 1%; Bennet, Bullock, Castro, Delaney, and Sestak with 0%)	13%
Suffolk University/USA Today	Sep 19–23, 2019	500 (LV)	–	23%	2%	3%	4%	0%	1%	14%	3%	19%	3%	4% (Note: Bennet, Bullock, Castro and Gabbard with 1%; de Blasio, Delaney, Messam, Ryan, Sestak and Williamson with 0%; "refused" with 1%)	21%
YouGov/CBS News	Aug 28 – Sep 4, 2019	563 (LV)	± 4.9%	27%	1%	4%	6%	0%	3%	29%	2%	18%	1%	9% (Note: Castro with 2%; de Blasio, Delaney, Gabbard, Ryan, and Sestak with 1%; Bennet, Bullock, Messam, and Williamson with 0%; others with 2%)	–
Gravis Marketing	Aug 14–16, 2019	382 (RV)	± 5.0%	25%	3%	5%	9%	2%	0%	10%	6%	15%	2%	13% (Note: Bennet, de Blasio, and Gabbard with 2%; Bullock, Castro, Delaney, Gillibrand, Inslee, Ryan, and Williamson with 1%)	9%
Change Research	Aug 2–8, 2019	439 (LV)	± 4.7%	26%	0%	7%	10%	1%	2%	22%	3%	23%	1%	5% (Note: Castro, Gabbard, Gillibrand, and Inslee with 1%; Bennet, Booker, Bullock, Hickenlooper, and Williamson with 0%)	–
Morning Consult	Jul 1–21, 2019	749 (RV)	± 4.0%	29%	3%	6%	11%	1%	3%	23%	1%	12%	3%	10% (Note: Castro with 2%; Bullock, de Blasio, and Ryan with 1%; others with 4%)	–
	Jul 9, 2019	Steyer announces his candidacy													
Monmouth University	Jun 6–11, 2019	370 (LV)	± 5.1%	36%	2%	7%	6%	1%	2%	13%	–	19%	2%	3% (Note: Castro, Gabbard, and Williamson with 1%; Bullock, Hickenlooper, Inslee, Messam, and Ryan with <1%; Bennet, de Blasio, Delaney, Gillibrand, Gravel, Moulton, and Swalwell with 0%)	8%
Change Research	May 9–12, 2019	389 (LV)	–	29%	2%	13%	11%	1%	4%	24%	–	12%	1%	4% (Note: Abrams, Castro, Gabbard, and Swalwell with 1%; Gillibrand, Hickenlooper, Inslee, and Ryan with 0%)	–
	Apr 25, 2019	Biden announces his candidacy													
	Apr 14, 2019	Buttigieg announces his candidacy													
Emerson College	Mar 28–30, 2019	310 (LV)	± 5.5%	26%	2%	5%	9%	2%	10%	23%	–	10%	3%	9% (Note: Gabbard with 2%; Castro and Gillibrand with 1%; Hickenlooper and Inslee with 0%; others with 6%)	–

== Results ==
Bernie Sanders won the Nevada caucuses, with Joe Biden coming in second and Pete Buttigieg in third.

Final alignment popular vote share by county
Sanders—30–40%
Sanders—40–50%
Sanders—60–70%
Sanders—70–80%
Buttigieg—<30%
Buttigieg—30–40%
Buttigieg—40–50%

County convention delegates won by county
Sanders—30–40%
Sanders—40–50%
Sanders—50–60%
Sanders—70–80%
Buttigieg—<30%
Buttigieg—30–40%
Buttigieg—40–50%
Steyer—<30%

Final alignment popular vote share by congressional district
Sanders—30–40%
Sanders—40–50%

2020 Nevada Democratic presidential caucuses
Candidate	First alignment		Final alignment		County convention delegates		Pledged national convention delegates
Candidate	Votes	%	Votes	%	Number	%	Pledged national convention delegates
Bernie Sanders	35,652	33.99	41,075	40.45	6,788	46.84	24
Joe Biden	18,424	17.57	19,179	18.89	2,927	20.20	9
Pete Buttigieg	16,102	15.35	17,598	17.33	2,073	14.31	3
Elizabeth Warren	13,438	12.81	11,703	11.53	1,406	9.70	
Tom Steyer	9,503	9.06	4,120	4.06	682	4.71	
Amy Klobuchar	10,100	9.63	7,376	7.26	603	4.16	
Tulsi Gabbard	353	0.34	32	0.03	4	0.03	
Andrew Yang (withdrawn)	612	0.58	49	0.05	1	0.01	
Michael Bennet (withdrawn)	140	0.13	36	0.04	0	0.00	
Deval Patrick (withdrawn)	86	0.08	8	0.01	0	0.00	
John Delaney (withdrawn; not on the ballot)	1	0.00	0	0.00	0	0.00	
Uncommitted	472	0.45	367	0.36	7	0.05	
Total	104,883	100%	101,543	100%	14,491	100%	36

=== Delay ===
Similarly to the Iowa caucus, there were some controversies surrounding the outcome of the caucus. One day after voting, with forty percent of the precincts not reported, Pete Buttigieg questioned the results citing more than "200 reports of problems merging the early votes". The full set of results was published two days after the caucus.

Reports of "confusion, calculation glitches and delays in reporting" emerged once again, bringing into question the future of caucuses, with former Nevada Senator Harry Reid calling for Nevada to switch to a primary system.

== Analysis ==
Participation in the 2020 caucuses (105,195 initial alignment votes in the official count) was 25% higher compared to the approximately 84,000 people who participated in the 2016 caucuses, but 4% less compared to the approximately 110,000 voters who participated in the 2008 caucuses.

Entrance polls by CNN indicated that Sanders won nearly every gender, race, age, and education demographic group, except for African-Americans and voters over 65, where Biden won 38–28 and 29–12 respectively. He performed extremely well among younger voters, capturing 65% of voters in the 17–29 demographic and 56% of voters under 45 overall, showcasing his overwhelming strength with the youth vote. In terms of ideological preference, Sanders won handily among voters who identified as liberal (50%) and somewhat liberal (29%), whereas Biden won over moderate voters (25%). Sanders also won the state's population center of Clark County, which constituted 70% of all caucusgoers, with 49% of the vote. In a break with Culinary Workers Union leadership who had previously come out against Sanders's Medicare for All plan, Sanders won several caucus precincts along the Las Vegas Strip, home to many hotel and casino workers who are members of the union.

Sanders's landslide victory has been attributed in part to his intentional outreach to Latino communities coordinated by staff member Chuck Rocha, resulting in winning 53% of Latino voters, who make up about 30% of Nevada's population. Under Rocha's direction, the Sanders campaign focused heavily on mobilizing Latino voters, a historically low-turnout demographic group, by hiring 76 Latino staffers and spending over $3 million on Spanish-language advertising specifically crafted to cater to Latino issues in Nevada.

Sanders's substantial margin of victory in Nevada, the first early state with a diverse electorate, helped ease concerns that his campaign had limited appeal among voters of color, as was the case in 2016. These concerns would arise again for Sanders when Joe Biden went on to win South Carolina, a state where 60% of the Democratic electorate is African-American, by a large margin.

For Biden, his distant second-place finish in Nevada helped allay fears of a faltering campaign after two underwhelming results in Iowa and New Hampshire. With South Carolina being the next state to hold a primary, it would be this state that would make or break his campaign – or one that would cement Bernie Sanders' status as a frontrunner.
