= 2016 Tennessee Democratic presidential primary =

- March 1, 2016

67 Democratic National Convention delegates

Candidate	Hillary Clinton	Bernie Sanders
Home state	New York	Vermont
Delegate count	44	23
Popular vote	245,930	120,800
Percentage	66.07%	32.45%

Clinton 40 – 50% 50 – 60% 60 – 70% 70 – 80% 80 – 90%	Sanders 50 – 60%

The 2016 Tennessee Democratic presidential primary took place on March 1 in the U.S. state of Tennessee as one of the Democratic Party's primaries ahead of the 2016 presidential election.

On the same day, dubbed "Super Tuesday," Democratic primaries were held in ten other states plus American Samoa, while the Republican Party held primaries in eleven states including their own Tennessee primary.

== Opinion polling ==
Poll source	Date	1st	2nd	3rd	Other
Primary results	March 1, 2016	Hillary Clinton; 66.1%	Bernie Sanders; 32.5%		Others / Uncommitted; 1.5%
SurveyMonkey Margin of error: ? Sample size: 533	February 22–29, 2016	Hillary Clinton; 54%	Bernie Sanders; 37%		Others / Undecided; 9%
NBC/WSJ/Marist Margin of error: ± 3.8; Sample size: 405	February 22–25, 2016	Hillary Clinton; 60%	Bernie Sanders; 34%		Other; 6%
Public Policy Polling Margin of error: ± 4.4; Sample size: 500	February 14–16, 2016	Hillary Clinton; 58%	Bernie Sanders; 32%		
Vanderbilt/PSRA Margin of error: 6.7% Sample size: 346	November 11–23, 2015	Hillary Clinton; 48%	Bernie Sanders; 28%	Martin O'Malley; 3%	Undecided 10%, Other 5%, Wouldn't Vote 4%
MTSU Margin of error: ± 4% Sample size: 603	October 25–27, 2015	Hillary Clinton; 44%	Bernie Sanders 16%		Don't know 25%

== Results ==
Primary date: March 1, 2016
National delegates: 75

Tennessee Democratic primary, March 1, 2016
Candidate	Popular vote		Estimated delegates		
Candidate	Count	Percentage	Pledged	Unpledged	Total
Hillary Clinton	245,930	66.07%	44	7	51
Bernie Sanders	120,800	32.45%	23	0	23
Martin O'Malley (withdrawn)	2,025	0.54%			
Uncommitted	3,467	0.93%	0	1	1
Total	372,222	100%	67	8	75

=== Results by county ===
County	Clinton	Votes	Sanders	Votes
Anderson	54.7%	2,328	43.4%	1,845
Bedford	67.8%	1,208	29.3%	523
Benton	63.5%	560	32.5%	287
Bledsoe	60.7%	398	32.8%	215
Blount	53.1%	2,736	45.8%	2,362
Bradley	55.2%	1,644	43.7%	1,302
Campbell	66.7%	656	30.7%	302
Cannon	64.5%	439	32.0%	218
Carroll	67.6%	721	28.8%	307
Carter	47.6%	774	51.0%	828
Cheatham	56.2%	1,065	42.2%	801
Chester	69.0%	342	28.8%	143
Claiborne	61.7%	544	35.4%	312
Clay	70.9%	270	27.0%	103
Cocke	55.6%	436	43.3%	361
Coffee	62.5%	1,503	34.6%	831
Crockett	78.5%	424	19.1%	103
Cumberland	57.8%	1,312	39.1%	888
Davidson	65.3%	43,691	33.8%	22,620
Decatur	67.5%	330	26.8%	131
DeKalb	69.1%	641	30.9%	286
Dickson	67.1%	1,497	31.2%	696
Dyer	71.5%	822	26.5%	304
Fayette	84.1%	2,003	15.2%	362
Fentress	63.2%	352	34.3%	191
Franklin	64.8%	1,590	33.0%	809
Gibson	76.8%	1,549	21.2%	427
Giles	73.2%	915	25.2%	315
Grainger	61.1%	283	25.2%	164
Greene	53.4%	1,079	44.2%	892
Grundy	64.8%	445	29.7%	204
Hamblen	56.5%	951	40.5%	682
Hamilton	64.4%	15,598	34.7%	8,411
Hancock	53.7%	80	44.3%	66
Hardeman	87.7%	1,721	11.5%	225
Hardin	70.7%	591	27.4%	229
Hawkins	58.7%	906	38.0%	587
Haywood	88.6%	1,197	10.6%	143
Henderson	68.9%	443	29.7%	191
Henry	66.2%	957	30.0%	434
Hickman	60.9%	543	36.2%	323
Houston	67.1%	320	29.6%	141
Humphreys	67.7%	737	30.5%	332
Jackson	65.3%	407	31.5%	196
Jefferson	54.2%	735	43.6%	592
Johnson	51.6%	245	46.9%	223
Knox	51.0%	13,137	47.9%	12,334
Lake	77.8%	186	19.7%	47
Lauderdale	82.9%	1,035	15.5%	194
Lawrence	53.6%	1,332	35.9%	893
Lewis	49.2%	232	48.3%	228
Lincoln	67.3%	728	30.3%	328
Loudon	60.5%	1,026	37.6%	638
Macon	65.2%	343	32.1%	169
Madison	80.7%	4,351	18.5%	999
Marion	62.0%	1,046	33.0%	559
Marshall	67.4%	838	30.9%	384
Maury	63.6%	2,366	35.1%	1,305
McMinn	60.8%	1,027	36.6%	619
McNairy	74.5%	719	23.7%	229
Meigs	66.3%	354	30.3%	162
Monroe	63.6%	1,232	30.8%	596
Montgomery	65.2%	5,555	33.2%	2,833
Moore	65.1%	209	29.0%	93
Morgan	58.7%	356	37.1%	225
Obion	65.3%	760	29.7%	345
Overton	59.1%	885	31.9%	477
Perry	65.0%	215	32.6%	108
Pickett	75.6%	214	22.6%	64
Polk	47.9%	757	35.2%	557
Putnam	51.9%	1,916	45.9%	1,692
Rhea	57.6%	503	37.9%	331
Roane	60.1%	1,454	37.9%	916
Robertson	68.5%	1,918	29.5%	827
Rutherford	57.2%	8,243	41.7%	6,016
Scott	58.3%	273	38.5%	180
Sequatchie	56.1%	273	42.3%	206
Sevier	49.4%	1,259	48.6%	1,241
Shelby	80.1%	66,465	19.3%	15,985
Smith	70.6%	654	27.3%	253
Stewart	66.0%	527	30.6%	244
Sullivan	54.1%	2,653	43.9%	2,153
Sumner	64.3%	4,225	34.4%	2,262
Tipton	71.1%	1,454	28.1%	574
Trousdale	72.5%	321	25.5%	113
Unicoi	46.0%	244	51.3%	272
Union	60.1%	316	37.3%	196
Van Buren	67.6%	242	26.8%	96
Warren	64.3%	1,318	32.7%	671
Washington	45.8%	2,444	53.1%	2,833
Wayne	63.0%	208	34.2%	113
Weakley	63.2%	860	33.2%	452
White	60.6%	688	35.3%	401
Williamson	60.3%	6,055	39.0%	3,911
Wilson	64.1%	3,873	34.8%	2,102
Total	66.1%	245,304	32.4%	120,333

== Analysis ==
Clinton swept Tennessee, winning the primary in a 34-point-routing over Bernie Sanders. The intensity of her victory in the primary was delivered by African American voters, who comprised 32% of the electorate and backed Clinton over Sanders by a margin of 89-10. Clinton also won the white vote 57-42. Clinton swept all income levels and educational attainment levels in Tennessee. And though Sanders won the youth vote, Clinton won among voters over the age of 45 by a margin of 78-21.

Her strong support among African American voters handed Clinton an 82-18 showing in the Memphis area. She also won in Nashville 66-33, in Central Tennessee 66-35, and in Eastern Tennessee which is whiter and considered to be an extension of Appalachia by a margin of 58-42.

== See also ==
- 2016 Tennessee Republican presidential primary
- 2016 United States presidential election in Tennessee
- 2016 Tennessee elections
