= 2016 Nevada Republican presidential caucuses =

- February 23, 2016

30 pledged delegates to the Republican National Convention
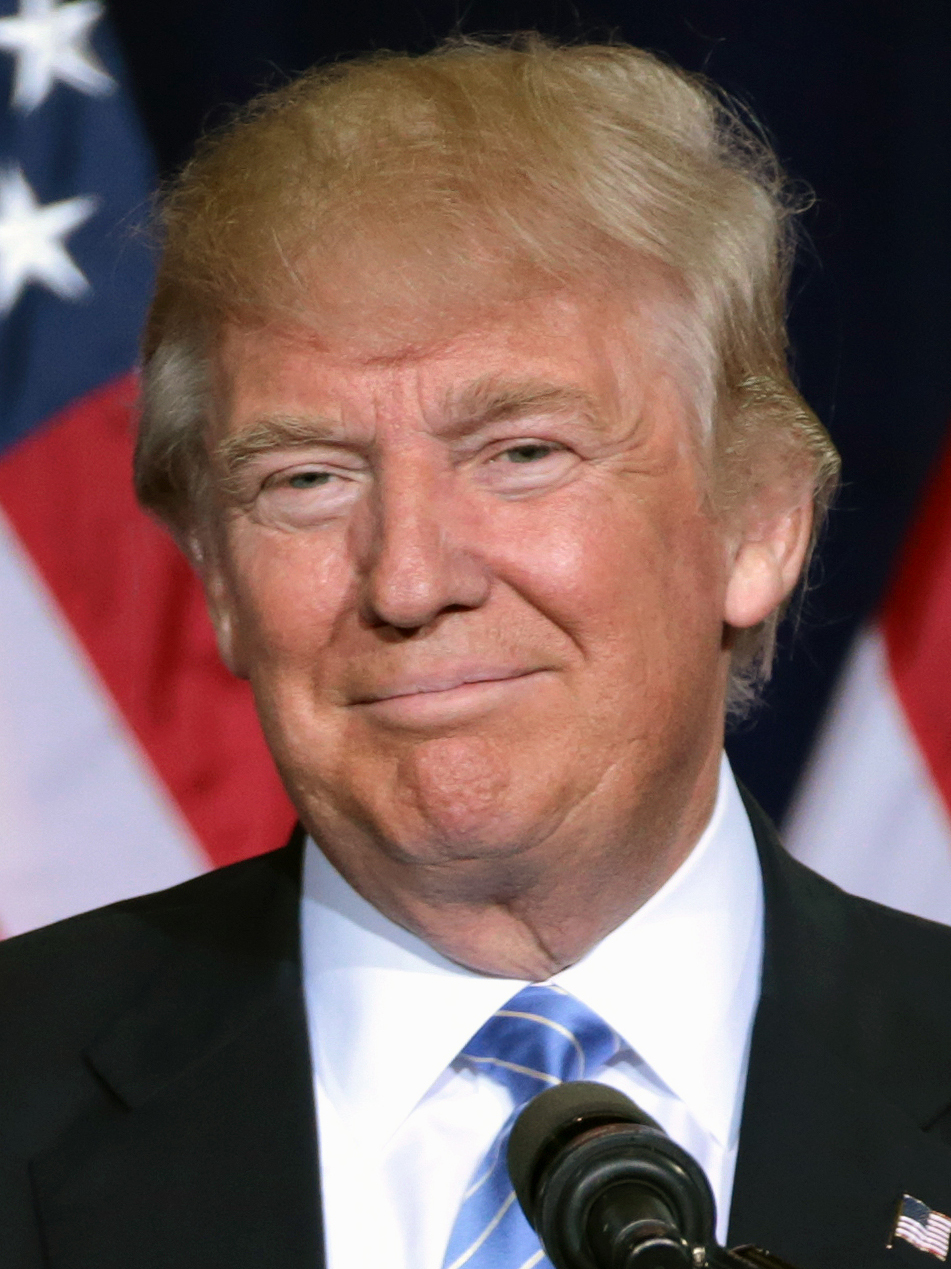

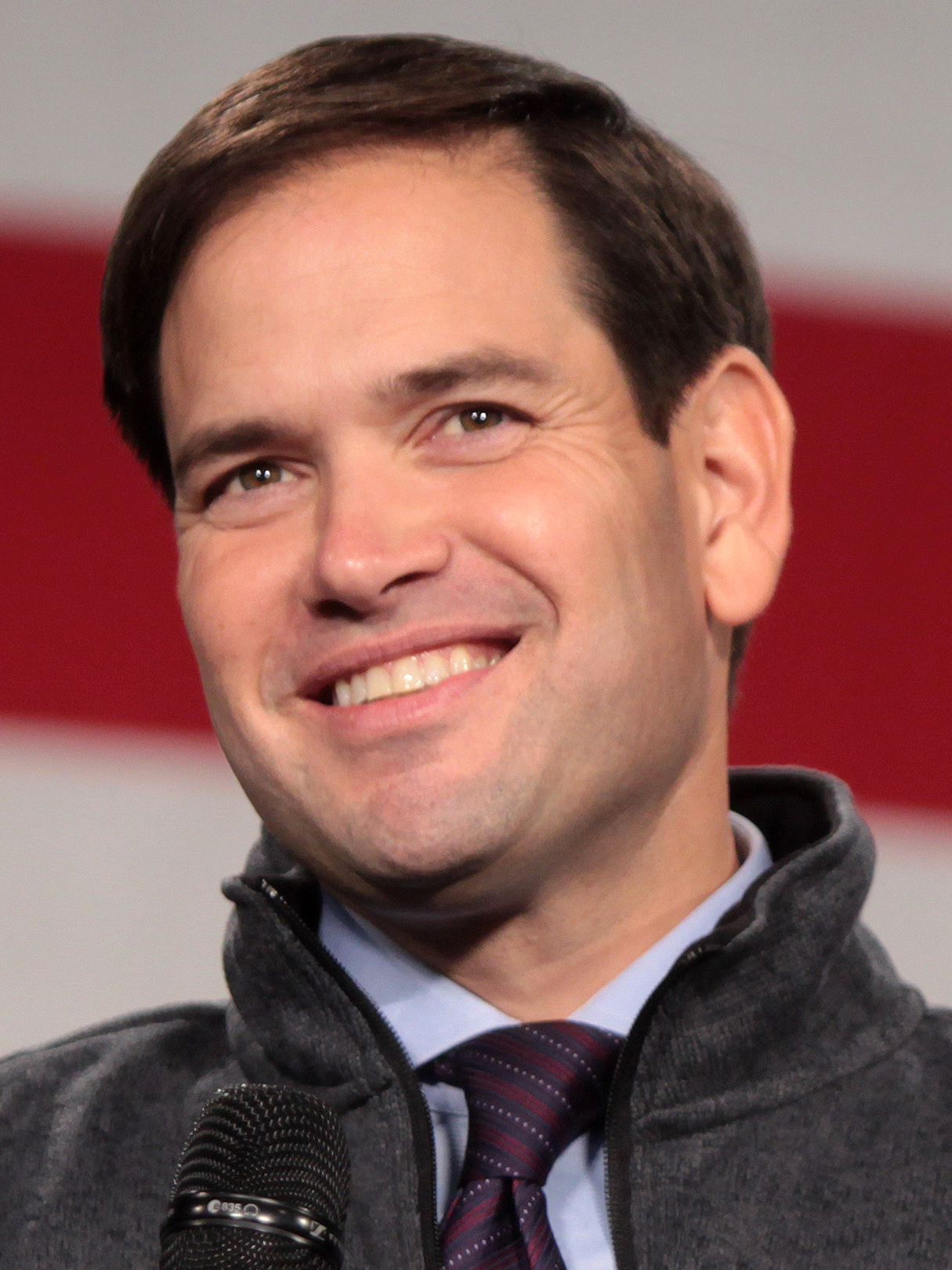

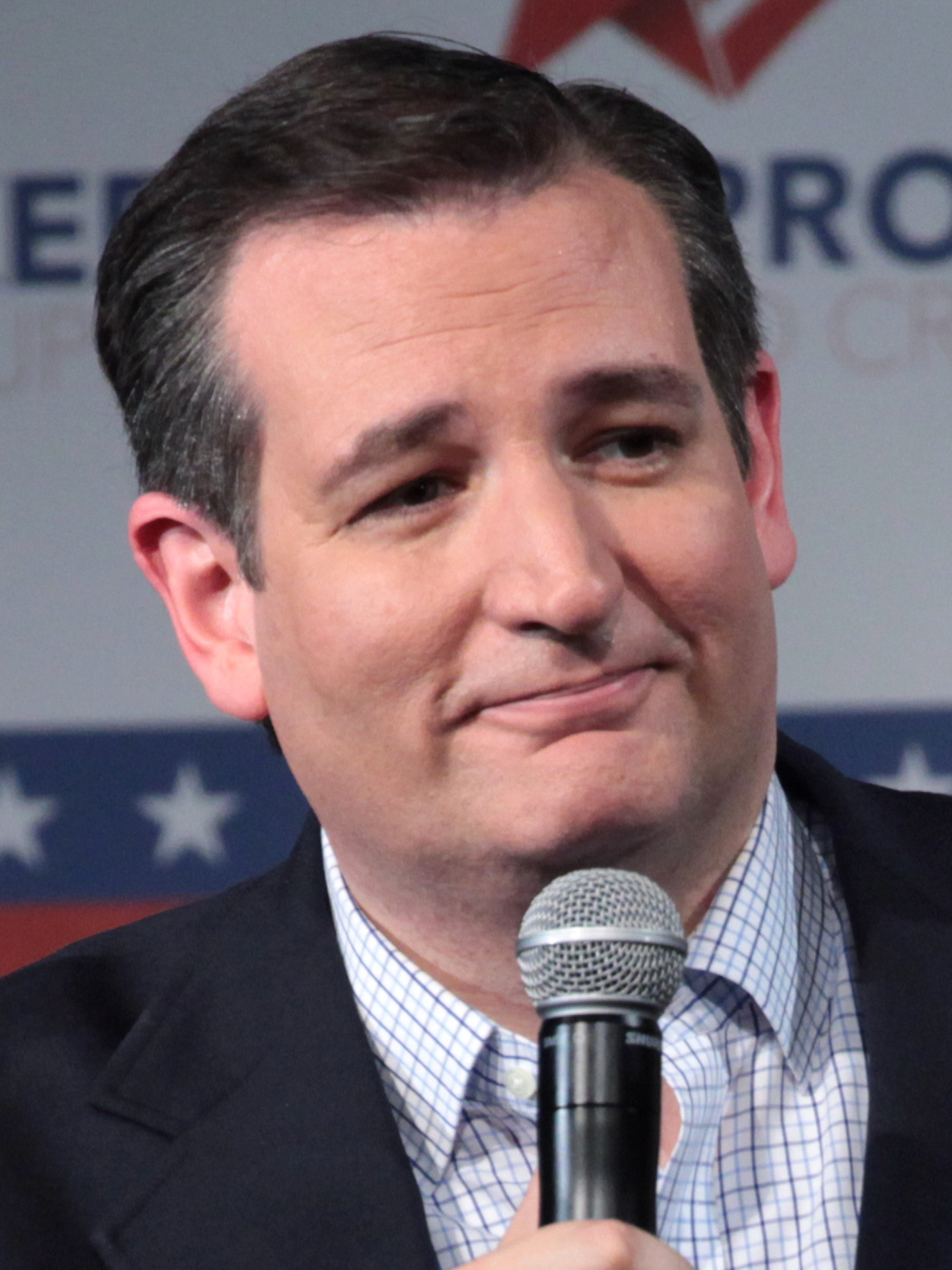

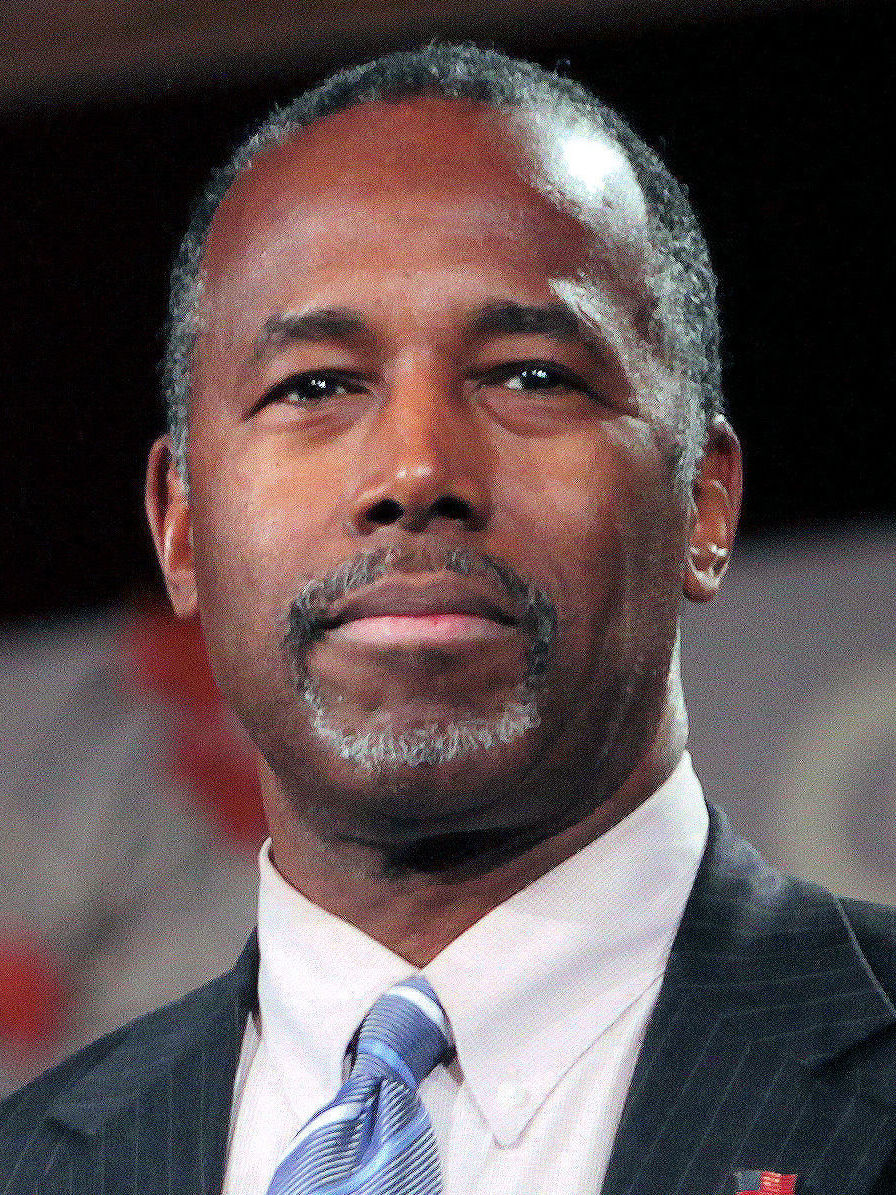

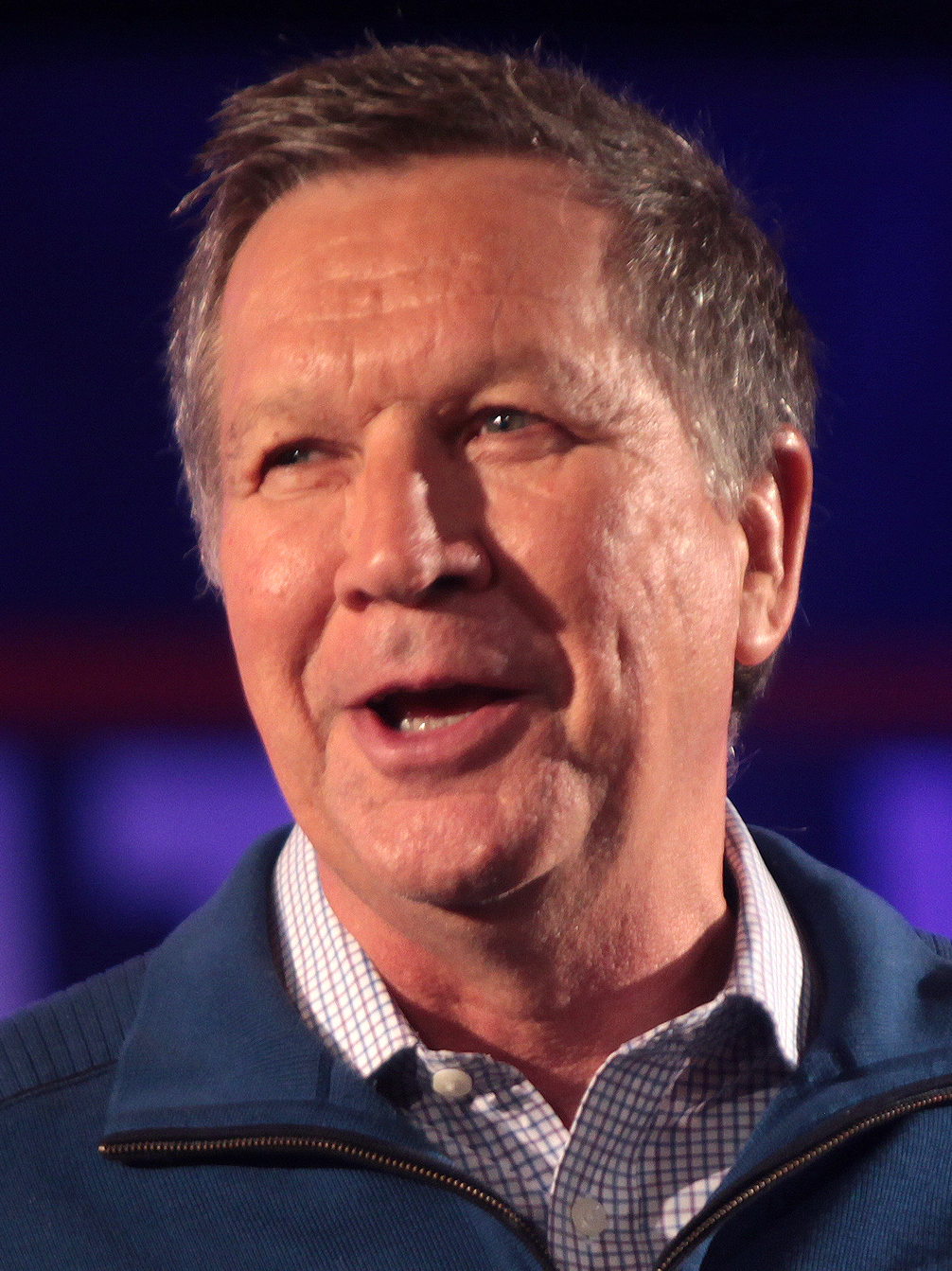
Candidate	Donald Trump	Marco Rubio	Ted Cruz
Home state	New York	Florida	Texas
Delegate count	14	7	6
Popular vote	34,531	17,940	16,079
Percentage	45.91%	23.85%	21.38%
Candidate	Ben Carson	John Kasich
Home state	Virginia	Ohio
Delegate count	2	1
Popular vote	3,619	2,709
Percentage	4.81%	3.60%

Donald Trump
30–40%
40–50%
50–60%
60–70%
Ted Cruz
40–50%

The 2016 Nevada Republican presidential caucuses took place on February 23 in the U.S. state of Nevada, marking the Republican Party's fourth nominating contest in their series of presidential primaries ahead of the 2016 presidential election.

With the Democratic Party having already held its Nevada caucuses three days earlier on February 20, the Republican caucus in Nevada was the only presidential primary on that day.

Donald Trump won the caucuses with his most convincing victory yet, with broad support across rural and urban counties. Ted Cruz carried two counties with large Mormon populations, but Marco Rubio narrowly surpassed Cruz due to his second place showing in populous Clark County.

During the 2015 legislative session, lawmakers attempted to change the caucus into a regular primary and at a much earlier date, however the bill failed to advance to a vote.

== Candidates ==
Nine candidates were eligible:

- Jeb Bush (dropped out)
- Ben Carson
- Chris Christie (dropped out)
- Ted Cruz
- Carly Fiorina (dropped out)
- Jim Gilmore (dropped out)
- John Kasich
- Marco Rubio
- Donald Trump

== Debates and forums ==
December 15, 2015 – Las Vegas, Nevada

The fifth debate was held on December 15, 2015, at the Venetian Resort in Las Vegas, Nevada. It was the second debate to air on CNN, and was also broadcast by Salem Radio. The debate was moderated solely by Wolf Blitzer with Dana Bash and Hugh Hewitt serving alongside as questioners.

The debate was split into primetime and pre-primetime groups based on averaged polling numbers; in order to participate in the main debate, candidates had to meet one of three criteria in polls conducted between October 29 and December 13 which were recognized by CNN—either an average of at least 3.5% nationally, or at least 4% in either Iowa or New Hampshire. The secondary debate featured candidates that had reached at least 1% in four separate national, Iowa, or New Hampshire polls that are recognized by CNN. Paul was included in the main debate after not qualifying under the original rules because he received 5% support in Iowa in a Fox News poll.

The debate lineup was announced on December 13 to include Trump, Cruz, Rubio, Carson, Bush, Fiorina, Christie, Paul, and Kasich in the primetime debate, and Huckabee, Santorum, Graham, and Pataki in the undercard debate. Commentators suggested that the key confrontation would be between Trump and Cruz, based on their respective polling in Iowa.

Eighteen million people watched the debate, making it the third-largest audience ever for a presidential primary debate. During the debate, the audible coughing was attributed to Ben Carson. His campaign admitted that they all got sick a month prior and Carson had kept the cough for weeks. The cough was "almost gone" and Carson was not really sick at the time.

The undercard debate was the fourth and final debate appearance of Senator Lindsey Graham and former Governor George Pataki, who suspended their campaigns on December 21 and December 29, respectively.

== Endorsements ==
Having been swept into numerous offices in the previous election, many new Nevada Republican officeholders came out in support of various candidates. Notably, there were splits among different groups of Republicans towards their endorsements. Legislators who had supported a controversial tax hike during the 2015 session came out in support of Jeb Bush and Marco Rubio, while those who opposed it supported Rand Paul, Ted Cruz or Donald Trump.

(Note: This list contains endorsements only for candidates who were still running at the time of the caucuses)

Ted Cruz

Statewide officials

- Attorney General Adam Laxalt

State legislators

- Assemblywoman Michelle Fiore
- Assemblywoman Victoria Seaman
- Assemblyman Ira Hansen
- Assemblyman John Moore (also supported Rand Paul)
- Assemblyman Jim Wheeler
- Assemblywoman Vicki Dooling
John Kasich

Statewide officials

- State Controller Ron Knecht

State legislators

- Assemblyman John Hambrick (Speaker) (previously endorsed Jeb Bush)
- Assemblywoman Vicki Dooling

Local officials

- Las Vegas City Councilman Bob Beers
Marco Rubio

Statewide officials

- Lieutenant Governor Mark Hutchison
- Former Governor Robert List
- Former Lieutenant Governor Lorraine Hunt-Bono

U.S. Senators

- U.S. Senator Dean Heller

U.S. Representatives

- Congressman Mark Amodei
- Congressman Cresent Hardy

State legislators

- State Senator Michael Roberson (Majority Leader)
- State Senator Joe Hardy (President Pro Tempore)
- State Senator Patricia Farley
- State Senator Becky Harris
- State Senator Scott Hammond
- State Senator Ben Kieckhefer
- Assemblyman Paul Anderson (Majority Leader) (previously endorsed Jeb Bush)
- Assemblyman Stephen Silberkraus
- Assemblyman Lynn Stewart
- Assemblyman Derek Armstrong
- Assemblyman Randy Kirner
- Assemblyman David Gardner (previously endorsed Jeb Bush)
- Assemblyman Glenn Trowbridge
- Assemblyman Pat Hickey
- Assemblyman Erv Nelson

Local officials

- Former Clark County Commissioner Bruce Woodbury
- Former North Las Vegas Mayor Shari Buck
Donald Trump

State legislators

- Assemblyman Brent Jones

== Polling ==
=== Aggregate polls ===
Source of poll aggregation	Dates administered	Dates updated	Marco Rubio Republican	Donald Trump Republican	Ted Cruz Republican	Margin
FiveThirtyEight	until February 23, 2016	February 23, 2016	27.1%	37.1%	21.0%	Trump +10.0

Poll source	Date	1st	2nd	3rd	Other
Primary results	February 23, 2016	Donald Trump45.75%	Marco Rubio23.77%	Ted Cruz21.30%	Ben Carson 4.79%, John Kasich 3.59%
CNN/ORC Margin of error: ± 6.5% Sample size: 245	February 10–15, 2016	Donald Trump; 45%	Marco Rubio 19%	Ted Cruz 17%	Ben Carson 7%, John Kasich 5%, Jeb Bush 1%, Someone else 2%, No opinion 4%
Gravis Marketing Margin of error: ± 5% Sample size: 406	December 23–27, 2015	Donald Trump; 33%	Ted Cruz 20%	Marco Rubio 11%	Ben Carson 6%, Carly Fiorina 5%, Jeb Bush 5%, Chris Christie 5%, Rand Paul 1%, Rick Santorum 1%, John Kasich 0%, Mike Huckabee 0%, Unsure 12%
Morning Consult Margin of error: ± 4% Sample size: 249	November 10–16, 2015	Donald Trump; 38%	Ben Carson 18%	Marco Rubio 12%	Ted Cruz 7%, Jeb Bush 6%, Carly Fiorina 2%, Mike Huckabee 2%, Rand Paul 2%, Chris Christie 1%, John Kasich 1%, Lindsey Graham 1%, Rick Santorum 0%, Someone else 1%, Don't know/No opinion 8%
CNN/ORC Margin of error: ± 6% Sample size: 285	October 3–10, 2015	Donald Trump; 38%	Ben Carson 22%	Carly Fiorina 8%	Marco Rubio 7%, Jeb Bush 6%, Ted Cruz 4%, Mike Huckabee 4%, Rand Paul 2%, Jim Gilmore 1%, Chris Christie 1%, George Pataki 1%, John Kasich 1%, Lindsey Graham 0%, Bobby Jindal 0%, Rick Santorum 0%, None 3%, No opinion 3%
Gravis Marketing Margin of error: ± 4% Sample size: 623	July 12–13, 2015	Donald Trump; 28%	Scott Walker 15%	Ben Carson 8%	Jeb Bush 7%, Marco Rubio 5%, Rand Paul 4%, Ted Cruz 4%, Rick Perry 3%, Bobby Jindal 2%, Mike Huckabee 2%, Chris Christie 2%, George Pataki 1%, Carly Fiorina 0%, Lindsey Graham 0%, Rick Santorum 0%, Undecided 20%
Gravis Marketing Margin of error: ± 5% Sample size: 443	March 27, 2015	Ted Cruz; 18%	Scott Walker; 18%	Jeb Bush; 16%	Marco Rubio 7%, Ben Carson 6%, Rand Paul 5%, Chris Christie 4%, Mike Huckabee 4%, Rick Santorum 2%, Carly Fiorina 1%, Undecided 20%
Gravis Marketing Margin of error: ± 5% Sample size: 438	February 21–22, 2015	Scott Walker; 27%	Jeb Bush 19%	Chris Christie 8%	Ted Cruz 6%, Mike Huckabee 6%, Rick Perry 6%, Marco Rubio 4%, Rick Santorum 4%, Rand Paul 3%, Bobby Jindal 1%, Undecided 16%

== Results ==
Primary date: February 23, 2016
County conventions: March 12 - April 2, 2016 (presumably)
State convention: May 7–8, 2016 (presumably)
National delegates: 30

Nevada Republican precinct caucuses, February 23, 2016
Candidate	Votes	Percentage	Actual delegate count		
Candidate	Votes	Percentage	Bound	Unbound	Total
Donald Trump	34,531	45.75%	14	0	14
Marco Rubio	17,940	23.77%	7	0	7
Ted Cruz	16,079	21.30%	6	0	6
Ben Carson	3,619	4.79%	2	0	2
John Kasich	2,709	3.59%	1	0	1
Invalid	266	0.35%	0	0	0
Rand Paul (withdrawn)	170	0.23%	0	0	0
Jeb Bush (withdrawn)	64	0.08%	0	0	0
Chris Christie (withdrawn)	50	0.07%	0	0	0
Carly Fiorina (withdrawn)	22	0.03%	0	0	0
Mike Huckabee (withdrawn)	21	0.03%	0	0	0
Rick Santorum (withdrawn)	11	0.01%	0	0	0
Jim Gilmore (withdrawn)			0	0	0
Unprojected delegates:			0	0	0
Total:	75,482	100.00%	30	0	30
Source: The Green Papers

Delegates were awarded to candidates who got more than 3.33% of the vote proportionally.

Donald Trump received more votes than the combined total of the 2012 Nevada caucuses, while also beating Mitt Romney's previous two records. On the eve of the caucuses, Trump stopped by Palo Verde High School in Summerlin to greet voters.

=== Results by County ===
2016 Republican Party Presidential Primary in Nevada (By County)
County	Donald Trump		Marco Rubio		Ted Cruz		Ben Carson		John Kasich		All Other Candidates		Total
County	#	%	#	%	#	%	#	%	#	%	#	%	Total
Carson City	1,066	43.44%	600	24.45%	462	18.83%	208	8.48%	102	4.16%	16	0.66%	2,454
Churchill	538	39.88%	342	25.35%	312	23.13%	108	8.01%	43	3.19%	6	0.44%	1,349
Clark	20,132	48.93%	10,114	24.58%	7,857	19.10%	1,488	3.62%	1,399	3.40%	156	0.38%	41,146
Douglas	1,683	36.44%	1,251	27.09%	1,195	25.88%	281	6.08%	199	4.31%	9	0.19%	4,618
Elko	600	25.32%	503	21.22%	1,039	43.84%	172	7.26%	37	1.56%	19	0.80%	2,370
Esmeralda	46	62.16%	8	10.81%	9	12.16%	7	9.46%	3	4.05%	1	1.35%	74
Eureka	81	41.54%	31	15.90%	67	34.36%	8	4.10%	7	3.59%	1	0.51%	195
Humboldt	361	41.83%	182	21.09%	189	21.90%	85	9.85%	42	4.87%	4	0.46%	863
Lander	165	39.76%	72	17.35%	148	35.66%	20	4.82%	9	2.17%	1	0.24%	415
Lincoln	82	28.77%	46	16.14%	127	44.56%	27	9.47%	3	1.05%	0	0.00%	285
Lyon	1,399	48.24%	506	17.45%	711	24.52%	208	7.17%	67	2.31%	9	0.31%	2,900
Mineral	97	50.79%	38	19.90%	37	19.37%	13	6.81%	6	3.14%	0	0.00%	191
Nye	980	56.48%	220	12.68%	408	23.52%	83	4.78%	24	1.38%	20	1.15%	1,735
Pershing	118	40.69%	57	19.66%	82	28.28%	21	7.24%	12	4.14%	0	0.00%	290
Storey	161	42.93%	57	15.20%	79	21.07%	70	18.67%	8	2.13%	0	0.00%	375
Washoe	6,850	44.13%	3,815	24.58%	3,240	20.87%	794	5.12%	731	4.71%	91	0.59%	15,521
White Pine	172	39.54%	98	22.53%	117	26.90%	26	5.98%	17	3.91%	5	1.15%	435
Totals	34,531	45.91%	17,940	23.85%	16,079	21.38%	3,619	4.81%	2,709	3.60%	338	0.45%	75,216

== Analysis ==
Donald Trump overwhelmingly won the caucuses, with Marco Rubio, who for a time lived in Nevada, coming in a distant second. According to exit polls by Edison Research, Trump won among ideologically moderate (50%) and somewhat conservative (55%) voters. Trump carried white caucus-goers with 47% and Latino caucus-goers with 45%.

Ted Cruz won two counties, Elko and Nye, the latter of which has a large LDS population. Mormon voters continued to be a strong constituency for Cruz throughout the primary.
