= 2016 Nevada Democratic presidential caucuses =

- February 20, 2016

43 Democratic National Convention delegates (35 pledged, 8 unpledged)

Candidate	Hillary Clinton	Bernie Sanders
Home state	New York	Vermont
Delegate count	20	15
Percentage	52.64%	47.29%
Election results by county.
Clinton
50 – 60%
60 – 70%
Sanders
40 – 50%
50 – 60%
60 – 70%
80 – 90%
Tie
50%

The 2016 Nevada Democratic presidential caucuses was held on Saturday February 20 in the U.S. state of Nevada, traditionally marking the Democratic Party's third nominating contest in their series of presidential primaries ahead of the 2016 presidential election. The Republican Party held its South Carolina primary on the same day, while their own Nevada caucuses took place on February 23.

With all other candidates having dropped out of the race ahead of the Nevada caucuses, the two remaining candidates were Bernie Sanders and Hillary Clinton.

== Process ==
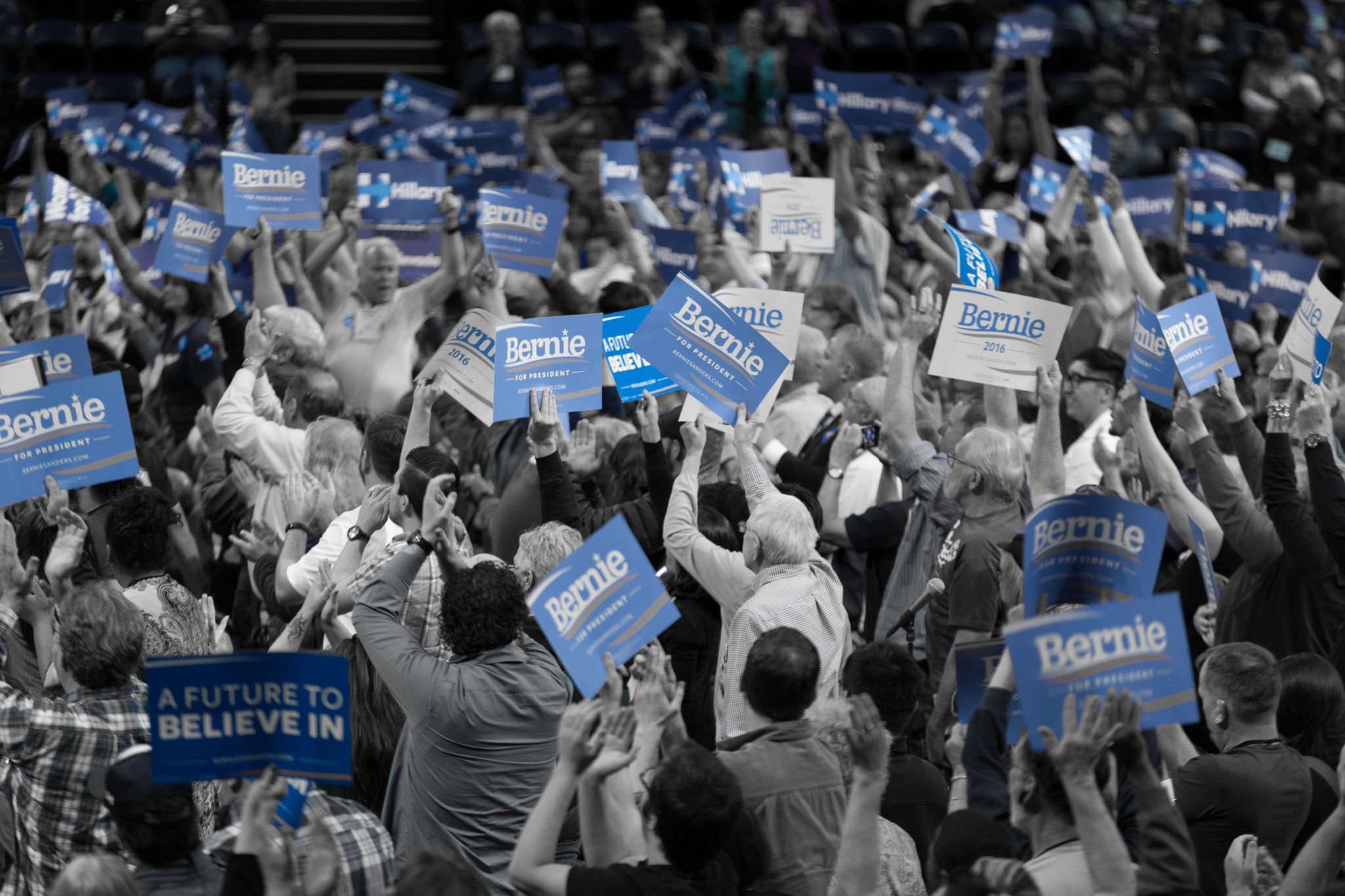
Tension arises at the Washoe County Democratic Convention 2016, between Sanders supporters in front and Clinton supporters behind.

Of the total number of 43 delegates the Nevada Democratic Party may send to the 2016 Democratic National Convention, 35 are pledged and 8 are unpledged.

The delegate selection process is a system with three levels:

1. The first step in the delegate selection process were the precinct caucuses on February 20, which elected about 12,000 delegates to the county conventions.
2. At the county conventions on April 2, the county delegates selected about 4,000 delegates to the state convention.
3. At the state convention on May 14–15, the final 35 pledged delegates to the National Convention will be selected. 23 of them are allocated proportionally based on congressional district results, whereas the remaining 12 are allocated based on the state convention as a whole.

== State convention ==
The state convention was held in May as the final stage of the delegate selection process. Supporters of Sanders believed that the convention rules, which had been largely the same for the previous 8 years, gave an unfair amount of power to the convention chair. The rules specifically lay out that all convention votes must be done by voice vote, and that only the convention chair can declare the winner or call for a more specific method of voting among the thousands of delegates. During the vote the convention chair, Roberta Lange accepted the "yeas" even though the "nays" were louder than the "yeas" in the room. Both preliminary and final delegate counts showed that Clinton supporters outnumbered Sanders supporters in the room, though many Sanders delegates had left after Lange's decision and did not stay to be counted in the final count. When Lange accepted the "yeas", some Sanders supporters confronted Lange and other members of the party's executive board on the main stage. The event was quickly shut down after that. Casino spokeswoman Jennifer Forkis said the event ran over its allotted time by about four hours, meaning security hired for the event would soon leave their shifts. "Without adequate security personnel, and in consultation with the Las Vegas Metropolitan Police Department and event organizers, a decision was made that it was in the best interest of everyone in attendance to end the event," Forkis said in a statement. An additional 10 to 15 Las Vegas Metropolitan police officers had been deployed to the event, with some forming a protective barrier in front of the stage after the proceedings were declared closed by party officials.

The Sanders campaign alleged that the leadership of the Democratic Party "used its power to prevent a fair and transparent process from taking place."

== Debates and forums ==
=== October 2015 debate in Las Vegas ===
On October 13, 2015, the Democratic Party's very first debate was held at the Wynn Hotel in Las Vegas. Hosted by Anderson Cooper, it aired on CNN and was broadcast on radio by Westwood One. Participants were the candidates Hillary Clinton, Bernie Sanders, Jim Webb, Martin O'Malley, and Lincoln Chafee. It was the first and only debate appearance of Chafee and Webb, who ended their campaigns on October 23 and October 20, respectively.

=== February 2016 forum in Las Vegas ===
On February 18, MSNBC and Telemundo hosted a forum in Las Vegas.

== Opinion polling ==
Delegate count: 35 Pledged, 8 Unpledged Winner: Hillary Clinton
Caucus date: February 20, 2016

Poll source	Date	1st	2nd	Other
Caucus results	February 20, 2016	Hillary Clinton; 52.6%	Bernie Sanders; 47.3%	Other; 0.1%
Gravis Marketing Margin of error: ± 4.0; Sample size: 516	February 14–15, 2016	Hillary Clinton; 53%	Bernie Sanders; 47%	
CNN/ORC Margin of error: ± 6.0; Sample size: 282	February 10–15, 2016	Hillary Clinton; 48%	Bernie Sanders; 47%	Others / Undecided; 6%
Washington Free Beacon/TPC Research Margin of error: ± 2.9; Sample size: 1,236	February 8–10, 2016	Hillary Clinton; 45%	Bernie Sanders; 45%	Undecided 9%

Polls in 2015

Poll source	Date	1st	2nd	3rd	Other
Gravis Marketing Margin of error: ± 5% Sample size: 326	December 23–27, 2015	Hillary Clinton; 50%	Bernie Sanders; 27%	Martin O'Malley; 1%	Unsure 16%
CNN/ORC Margin of error: ± 6% Sample size: 253	October 3–10, 2015	Hillary Clinton; 50%	Bernie Sanders; 34%	Joe Biden; 12%	
Gravis Marketing Margin of error: ± 5% Sample size: 416	July 12–13, 2015	Hillary Clinton; 55%	Bernie Sanders; 18%	Elizabeth Warren; 8%	Joe Biden 5%, Lincoln Chafee 1%, Jim Webb 1%, Martin O'Malley 0%, Unsure 12%
Gravis Marketing Margin of error: ± 6% Sample size: 324	March 27, 2015	Hillary Clinton; 61%	Elizabeth Warren; 15%	Bernie Sanders; 7%	Joe Biden 3%, Al Gore 3%, Martin O'Malley 1%, Jim Webb 0%, Unsure 10%
Gravis Marketing Margin of error: ± 6% Sample size: 324	February 21–22, 2015	Hillary Clinton; 58%	Elizabeth Warren; 20%	Joe Biden; 8%	Bernie Sanders 4%, Jim Webb 3%, Martin O'Malley 0%, Undecided 7%

== Results ==
Primary date: February 20, 2016
County conventions: April 2, 2016
State convention: May 14, 2016
National delegates: 43

Nevada Democratic caucuses, February 20, 2016
Candidate	County delegates		Estimated delegates		
Candidate	Count	Percentage	Pledged	Unpledged	Total
Hillary Clinton	6,440	52.64%	20	4	24
Bernie Sanders	5,785	47.29%	15	1	16
Uncommitted	8	0.07%	0	3	3
Total	12,233	100%	35	8	43

Nevada Democratic county conventions, April 2, 2016
Candidate	State delegates		Estimated delegates		
Candidate	Count	Percentage	Pledged	Unpledged	Total
Bernie Sanders	2,124	55.23%	17	1	18
Hillary Clinton	1,722	44.77%	18	4	22
Uncommitted	0	0.00%	0	3	3
Total		100%	35	8	43
Source: The Moderate Voice

Nevada Democratic state conventions, May 14, 2016
Candidate	State delegates		Estimated delegates		
Candidate	Count	Percentage	Pledged	Unpledged	Total
Hillary Clinton	1,695	50.49%	20	4	24
Bernie Sanders	1,662	49.51%	15	1	16
Uncommitted	0	0.00%	0	3	3
Total		100%	35	8	43
Source: Nevada Democrats

=== Results by county ===
County	Clinton	Votes	Sanders	Votes
Carson City	49.11%	83	50.89%	86
Churchill	50.00%	46	50.00%	46
Clark	54.82%	4,889	45.14%	4,026
Douglas	54.14%	85	45.86%	72
Elko	43.18%	38	56.82%	50
Esmeralda	31.82%	7	68.18%	15
Eureka	13.64%	3	86.36%	19
Humboldt	33.75%	27	66.25%	53
Lander	28.99%	20	69.57%	48
Lincoln	60.32%	38	39.68%	25
Lyon	47.62%	80	52.38%	88
Mineral	53.42%	39	46.58%	34
Nye	58.75%	94	40.63%	65
Pershing	47.76%	32	49.25%	33
Storey	47.95%	35	52.05%	38
Washoe	45.70%	877	54.25%	1,041
White Pine	50.54%	47	49.46%	46
Total	52.64%	6,440	47.29%	5,785

== Analysis ==
Clinton won the popular vote handily in the Nevada caucus, after a rough start to the primary season. With a razor-thin victory in Iowa and a crushing defeat in New Hampshire, Clinton rebounded to a five-point-win in Nevada aided by late campaigning among casino workers. As The New York Times describes, "At a caucus at the famed Caesars Palace, blackjack dealers, pit bosses, cooks and housekeepers excitedly declared their support for the former secretary of state."

Clinton had campaigned heavily in the state, airing an ad in which she comforted a young Latina girl who was worried her parents would be deported. Clinton's message appeared to resonate with Hispanic and African American voters, with Clinton winning by large margins in many diverse neighborhoods in populous Clark County, especially in caucuses in Las Vegas.
