= 2024 United States presidential election in Utah =

- November 5, 2024
- Turnout: 85.26% (▼4.83 pp)

| Nominee | Donald Trump | Kamala Harris |
| Party | Republican | Democratic |
| Home state | Florida | California |
| Running mate | JD Vance | Tim Walz |
| Electoral vote | 6 | 0 |
| Popular vote | 883,818 | 562,566 |
| Percentage | 59.38% | 37.79% |

Trump
40–50%
50–60%
60–70%
70–80%
80–90%
90–100%
Harris
40–50%
50–60%
60–70%
70–80%
80–90%
90–100%
Tie/No data
President before election
Joe Biden
Democratic
Elected President
Donald Trump
Republican

The 2024 United States presidential election in Utah took place on Tuesday, November 5, 2024, as part of the 2024 United States presidential election in which all 50 states plus the District of Columbia participated. Utah voters chose electors to represent them in the Electoral College via a popular vote. The state of Utah has six electoral votes in the Electoral College, following reapportionment due to the 2020 United States census in which the state neither gained nor lost a seat. Prior to the election, all major news organizations once again considered Utah a state Trump would win, or a red state.

Republican Donald Trump carried Utah by 21.6%, an improvement over his past two statewide victories. Trump's popular vote percentage increased by 1.25% compared to the previous presidential election. Although Trump improved his margin in all 50 states, Utah had the second-smallest swing to the right after Washington state.

== Primary elections ==
=== Democratic primary ===
The Utah Democratic primary was held on Super Tuesday, March 5, 2024. Incumbent president Joe Biden easily won the state, facing minor opposition from activist Marianne Williamson and Congressman Dean Phillips.

Popular vote share by county Biden: 70–80%; 80–90%; >90%

2024 Utah Democratic pres. primary
| Candidate | Votes | % | Delegates |
|---|---|---|---|
| Joe Biden (incumbent) | 59,235 | 86.80 | 30 |
| Marianne Williamson | 3,562 | 5.22 | 0 |
| Dean Phillips | 3,065 | 4.49 | 0 |
| Gabriel Cornejo | 1,517 | 2.22 | 0 |
| Frank Lozada | 868 | 1.27 | 0 |
| Total | 68,247 | 100% | 30 |

=== Republican primary ===
The Utah Republican caucuses were held on Super Tuesday, March 5, 2024. Former president Donald Trump defeated former South Carolina governor Nikki Haley in one of his weakest performances of the greater Republican primaries. The state GOP returned to organizing a caucus after its use of the primary system in 2020, which significantly lowered turnout.

Popular vote share by county Trump: 50–60%; 60–70%; 70–80%; 80–90%; >90%; Haley: 50–60%

Utah Republican caucus, March 5, 2024
| Candidate | Votes | Percentage | Actual delegate count | | |
| Candidate | Votes | Percentage | Bound | Unbound | Total |
|---|---|---|---|---|---|
| Donald Trump | 48,350 | 56.35% | 40 | | 40 |
| Nikki Haley | 36,621 | 42.68% | | | |
| Ryan Binkley (withdrawn) | 826 | 0.96% | | | |
| Total: | 85,797 | 100.00% | 40 | | 40 |

== General election ==
=== Predictions ===
| Source | Ranking | As of |
|---|---|---|
| Cook Political Report | Solid R | December 19, 2023 |
| Inside Elections | Solid R | April 26, 2023 |
| Sabato's Crystal Ball | Safe R | June 29, 2023 |
| Decision Desk HQ/The Hill | Safe R | December 14, 2023 |
| CNalysis | Solid R | December 30, 2023 |
| CNN | Solid R | January 14, 2024 |
| The Economist | Safe R | June 12, 2024 |
| 538 | Solid R | June 11, 2024 |
| RCP | Solid R | June 26, 2024 |
| NBC News | Safe R | October 6, 2024 |

=== Candidate ballot access ===
As of August 2024, the following candidates have been designated as "Election Candidates":

- Kamala Harris / Tim Walz, Democratic
- Claudia De la Cruz / Karina Garcia, unaffiliated (Note: De la Cruz and Garcia were nominated by the Party for Socialism and Liberation but are listed on the ballot as independents because the party did not have ballot access.)
- Lucifer "Justin Case" Everylove, unaffiliated
- Cornel West / Melina Abdullah, unaffiliated
- Donald Trump / JD Vance, Republican

==== Robert F. Kennedy Jr. lawsuit ====
On December 5, 2023, independent candidate Robert F. Kennedy Jr. filed a lawsuit against lieutenant governor Deidre Henderson and state elections director Ryan Cowley, arguing that the state's requirement for unaffiliated candidates to attain 1,000 verified signatures before the January 8 deadline is unconstitutional and that it forces Kennedy's campaign to hire professional petition circulators. In the 2020 election, the filing deadline was August 17, and was moved up in a bill passed by the Utah State Legislature in February 2022. Campaign lawyer Paul Rossi argued that the deadline was made "to block any third-party candidates from appearing on Utah's ballot," showing "an absolute contempt for the Constitution." A court filing was made by state attorney general Sean Reyes on December 7, stating that Henderson and Cowley have agreed to not enforce the deadline until March 5, 2024, per request of senior judge David Nuffer. Kennedy later qualified to appear on the Utah ballot on December 28, 2023, marking the first state to award him official ballot access. Kennedy would later withdraw from the ballot in Utah after the suspension of his campaign and endorse Donald Trump for president.

=== Polling ===
Donald Trump vs. Kamala Harris

| Poll source | Date(s) administered | Sample size (Note: Key: A – all adults RV – registered voters LV – likely voters V – unclear) | Margin of error | Donald Trump Republican | Kamala Harris Democratic | Other / Undecided |
|---|---|---|---|---|---|---|
| ActiVote | October 7–30, 2024 | 400 (LV) | ± 4.9% | 60% | 40% | – |
| Noble Predictive Insights | October 2–7, 2024 | 600 (RV) | ± 4.0% | 52% | 39% | 9% |
| Noble Predictive Insights | October 2–7, 2024 | 539 (LV) | ± 4.2% | 54% | 38% | 8% |
| Public Policy Polling (D) (Note: Poll sponsored by the campaign of Brian King, the Democratic nominee for Utah's gubernatorial election) | September 27–28, 2024 | 612 (LV) | ± 4.0% | 54% | 39% | 7% |

Donald Trump vs. Kamala Harris vs. Cornel West vs. Jill Stein vs. Chase Oliver

| Poll source | Date(s) administered | Sample size | Margin of error | Donald Trump Republican | Kamala Harris Democratic | Cornel West Independent | Jill Stein Green | Chase Oliver Libertarian | Other / Undecided |
|---|---|---|---|---|---|---|---|---|---|
| Noble Predictive Insights | October 25–28, 2024 | 695 (LV) | ± 3.7% | 54% | 34% | 0% | 0% | 1% | 11% (Note: Joel Skousen (C) and Claudia De la Cruz (PSL) with 1% each) |
| Deseret News/Hinckley Institute of Politics | October 15–19, 2024 | 813 (RV) | ± 3.4% | 61% | 30% | 2% | 1% | – | 6% |
| Deseret News/Hinckley Institute of Politics | October 15–19, 2024 | 813 (RV) | ± 3.4% | 63% (Note: With voters who lean towards a given candidate) | 31% | 4% | 2% | – | – |
| Noble Predictive Insights | October 2–7, 2024 | 600 (RV) | ± 4.0% | 51% | 37% | 2% | 1% | 1% | 8% (Note: Joel Skousen (C) with 0%) |
| Noble Predictive Insights | October 2–7, 2024 | 539 (LV) | ± 4.2% | 54% | 36% | 2% | 0% | 2% | 6% |

Hypothetical polling with Donald Trump and Joe Biden

Donald Trump vs. Joe Biden

| Poll source | Date(s) administered | Sample size | Margin of error | Donald Trump Republican | Joe Biden Democratic | Other / Undecided |
|---|---|---|---|---|---|---|
| Deseret News/Hinckley Institute of Politics | June 4–7, 2024 | 857 (RV) | ± 3.4% | 57% | 25% | 18% |
| John Zogby Strategies (Note: Poll conducted for Kennedy's campaign) | April 13–21, 2024 | 414 (LV) | – | 46% | 43% | 11% |
| Noble Predictive Insights | April 8–16, 2024 | 600 (RV) | ± 4.0% | 54% | 26% | 20% |
| Mainstreet Research/Florida Atlantic University | February 29 – March 3, 2024 | 174 (RV) | – | 46% | 37% | 17% (Note: "Another candidate" with 11%) |
| Mainstreet Research/Florida Atlantic University | February 29 – March 3, 2024 | 166 (LV) | – | 46% | 38% | 16% |
| Deseret News/Hinckley Institute of Politics | January 16–21, 2024 | 801 (RV) | ± 3.0% | 43% | 33% | 24% (Note: "Another candidate" with 24%) |
| Emerson College | October 25–28, 2022 | 825 (LV) | ± 3.0% | 47% | 34% | 19% |

Donald Trump vs. Joe Biden vs. Robert F. Kennedy Jr.

| Poll source | Date(s) administered | Sample size | Margin of error | Donald Trump Republican | Joe Biden Democratic | Robert F. Kennedy Jr. Independent | Other / Undecided |
|---|---|---|---|---|---|---|---|
| Deseret News/Hinckley Institute of Politics | June 4–7, 2024 | 857 (RV) | ± 3.4% | 49% | 20% | 20% | 11% |

Donald Trump vs. Joe Biden vs. Robert F. Kennedy Jr. vs. Cornel West vs. Jill Stein

| Poll source | Date(s) administered | Sample size | Margin of error | Donald Trump Republican | Joe Biden Democratic | Robert F. Kennedy Jr. Independent | Cornel West Independent | Jill Stein Green | Other / Undecided |
|---|---|---|---|---|---|---|---|---|---|
| Noble Predictive Insights | April 8–16, 2024 | 600 (RV) | ± 4.0% | 47% | 23% | 13% | 1% | 1% | 15% |

Hypothetical polling with other candidates

Donald Trump vs. Robert F. Kennedy Jr.

| Poll source | Date(s) administered | Sample size | Margin of error | Donald Trump Republican | Robert F. Kennedy Jr. Independent | Other / Undecided |
|---|---|---|---|---|---|---|
| John Zogby Strategies | April 13–21, 2024 | 414 (LV) | – | 40% | 44% | 16% |

Robert F. Kennedy Jr. vs. Joe Biden

| Poll source | Date(s) administered | Sample size | Margin of error | Robert F. Kennedy Jr. Independent | Joe Biden Democratic | Other / Undecided |
|---|---|---|---|---|---|---|
| John Zogby Strategies | April 13–21, 2024 | 414 (LV) | – | 54% | 36% | 10% |

=== Results ===
State House district results: Trump 40–50% 50–60% 60–70% 70–80% 80–90% / Harris 40–50% 50–60% 60–70% 70–80% 80–90%

2024 United States presidential election in Utah
| Party | Candidate | Votes | % | ±% |
|---|---|---|---|---|
| Republican | Donald Trump; JD Vance | 883,818 | 59.38% | ▲1.25% |
| Democratic | Kamala Harris; Tim Walz | 562,566 | 37.79% | ▲0.14% |
| Libertarian | Chase Oliver; Mike ter Maat | 16,902 | 1.14% | ▼1.44% |
| Constitution | Joel Skousen (Note: Randall Terry was nominated by the national Constitution Party, though the state party nominated Joel Skousen.); Rik Combs | 8,402 | 0.56% | ▲0.19% |
| Green | Jill Stein; Butch Ware | 8,222 | 0.55% | ▲0.21% |
| Socialism and Liberation | Claudia De la Cruz (Note: Listed on the ballot without party affiliation.); Karina Garcia | 3,189 | 0.21% | ▲0.13% |
| Independent | Lucifer Everylove; N/A | 2,653 | 0.18% | N/A |
| Independent | Cornel West; Melina Abdullah | 2,199 | 0.15% | N/A |
| Write-in | | 543 | 0.04% | Steady |
| Total votes | | 1,488,494 | 100.00% | N/A |

==== By county ====
| County | Donald Trump Republican | | Kamala Harris Democratic | | Various candidates Other parties | | Margin | | Total |
| County | # | % | # | % | # | % | # | % | Total |
|---|---|---|---|---|---|---|---|---|---|
| Beaver | 2,781 | 86.58% | 394 | 12.27% | 37 | 1.15% | 2,387 | 74.32% | 3,212 |
| Box Elder | 22,853 | 79.02% | 5,274 | 18.24% | 793 | 2.74% | 17,579 | 60.78% | 28,920 |
| Cache | 39,457 | 65.48% | 18,718 | 31.06% | 2,083 | 3.46% | 20,739 | 34.42% | 60,258 |
| Carbon | 6,719 | 71.14% | 2,525 | 26.73% | 201 | 2.13% | 4,194 | 44.40% | 9,445 |
| Daggett | 443 | 80.55% | 101 | 18.36% | 6 | 1.09% | 342 | 62.18% | 550 |
| Davis | 101,293 | 60.81% | 59,895 | 35.96% | 5,382 | 3.23% | 41,398 | 24.85% | 166,570 |
| Duchesne | 7,815 | 87.14% | 1,009 | 11.25% | 144 | 1.61% | 6,806 | 75.89% | 8,968 |
| Emery | 4,341 | 86.63% | 603 | 12.03% | 67 | 1.34% | 3,738 | 74.60% | 5,011 |
| Garfield | 2,211 | 78.66% | 541 | 19.25% | 59 | 2.10% | 1,670 | 59.41% | 2,811 |
| Grand | 2,327 | 43.91% | 2,828 | 53.36% | 145 | 2.74% | -501 | -9.45% | 5,300 |
| Iron | 21,571 | 77.38% | 5,683 | 20.39% | 624 | 2.24% | 15,888 | 56.99% | 27,878 |
| Juab | 5,671 | 87.01% | 734 | 11.26% | 113 | 1.73% | 4,937 | 75.74% | 6,518 |
| Kane | 3,277 | 73.02% | 1,137 | 25.33% | 74 | 1.65% | 2,140 | 47.68% | 4,488 |
| Millard | 5,558 | 87.02% | 713 | 11.16% | 116 | 1.82% | 4,845 | 75.86% | 6,387 |
| Morgan | 5,300 | 78.40% | 1,256 | 18.58% | 204 | 3.02% | 4,044 | 59.82% | 6,760 |
| Piute | 854 | 88.68% | 94 | 9.76% | 15 | 1.56% | 760 | 78.92% | 963 |
| Rich | 1,211 | 83.69% | 214 | 14.79% | 22 | 1.52% | 997 | 68.90% | 1,447 |
| Salt Lake | 221,555 | 43.47% | 273,658 | 53.70% | 14,424 | 2.83% | -52,103 | -10.22% | 509,637 |
| San Juan | 3,613 | 57.09% | 2,581 | 40.78% | 135 | 2.13% | 1,032 | 16.31% | 6,329 |
| Sanpete | 10,653 | 82.30% | 1,906 | 14.72% | 385 | 2.97% | 8,747 | 67.58% | 12,944 |
| Sevier | 9,526 | 87.19% | 1,236 | 11.31% | 164 | 1.50% | 8,290 | 75.87% | 10,926 |
| Summit | 10,783 | 41.67% | 14,612 | 56.47% | 481 | 1.86% | -3,829 | -14.80% | 25,876 |
| Tooele | 23,484 | 69.06% | 9,560 | 28.11% | 962 | 2.83% | 13,924 | 40.95% | 34,006 |
| Uintah | 13,599 | 85.90% | 1,952 | 12.33% | 281 | 1.77% | 11,647 | 73.57% | 15,832 |
| Utah | 203,476 | 68.25% | 84,937 | 28.49% | 9,730 | 3.26% | 118,539 | 39.76% | 298,143 |
| Wasatch | 11,495 | 62.63% | 6,459 | 35.19% | 400 | 2.18% | 5,036 | 27.44% | 18,354 |
| Washington | 73,165 | 75.23% | 22,327 | 22.96% | 1,764 | 1.81% | 50,838 | 52.27% | 97,256 |
| Wayne | 1,238 | 74.98% | 381 | 23.08% | 32 | 1.94% | 857 | 51.91% | 1,651 |
| Weber | 67,549 | 60.28% | 41,238 | 36.80% | 3,267 | 2.92% | 26,311 | 23.48% | 112,054 |
| Totals | 883,818 | 59.38% | 562,566 | 37.79% | 42,110 | 2.83% | 321,252 | 21.58% | 1,488,494 |

==== By congressional district ====
Trump won all four congressional districts.

| District | Trump | Harris | Representative |
|---|---|---|---|
| 1st | 58.54% | 38.50% | Blake Moore |
| 2nd | 58.88% | 38.56% | Celeste Maloy |
| 3rd | 58.26% | 38.95% | John Curtis (118th Congress) |
| 3rd | 58.26% | 38.95% | Mike Kennedy (119th Congress) |
| 4th | 61.90% | 35.23% | Burgess Owens |

== Analysis ==
A Mountain West state, Utah has not been won by a Democratic presidential candidate since Lyndon B. Johnson did in his 1964 landslide and is a strongly red state, a trait vastly owed to the state's conservative Mormon base. While the state has voted considerably less Republican than before 2016, Utah remains a GOP stronghold at both the federal and state levels. Utah stayed strongly red in other races, with Republican John Curtis winning by 31% in the concurrent 2024 U.S. Senate election in Utah, greatly outperforming Trump.

While Trump won the state handily, Utah had the second-smallest shift to the right in the nation in 2024 after Washington state. Trump improved his margin by just over 1%, compared to the national rightward swing of 6%. Despite Trump's improved margin from 2020, Utah was the only state where Harris won a higher percentage of the vote than Biden in 2020, and it was the highest percentage of the vote won by a Democrat in Utah since Johnson's 1964 victory. Utah was also one of only six states where Harris received more raw votes than Biden in 2020. (Note: The other five states were Georgia, Maine, Nevada, North Carolina, and Wisconsin.)

Democrat Kamala Harris won the same three counties that Joe Biden did in 2020: Salt Lake, home to the state capital and largest city Salt Lake City; Summit, home to a handful of ski resorts and SLC suburbs; and Grand, home to Moab and nearby Arches National Park. 17 out of Utah's 29 counties also shifted to Harris compared to 2020.

=== Nationwide trends ===
According to an analysis by The Economist, this may have been because of a realignment of college-educated and native-born voters to Democrats, while non-college and foreign-born voters shifted to Republicans. This played out nationally, with Harris gaining among White women with college degrees and Black women, while Trump gained among Whites without college degrees and Hispanic voters.

Utah, one of the most highly-educated states with relatively few foreign-born residents, did not shift significantly rightward. For example, Harris won over 30% of the vote in Cache County, home to Utah State University, the highest since 1964.

== See also ==
- United States presidential elections in Utah
- 2024 United States presidential election
- 2024 Democratic Party presidential primaries
- 2024 Republican Party presidential primaries
- 2024 Utah elections
- 2024 United States elections

== Notes ==
Partisan clients
