= 2016 Vermont Democratic presidential primary =

- March 1, 2016

Candidate	Bernie Sanders	Hillary Clinton
Home state	Vermont	New York
Delegate count	16	0
Popular vote	115,900	18,338
Percentage	85.69%	13.56%
- Sanders: 70–80% 80–90% >90%

The 2016 Vermont Democratic presidential primary was held on March 1, 2016, in the state of Vermont as one of the Democratic Party's primaries ahead of the 2016 presidential election.

On the same day, dubbed "Super Tuesday," Democratic primaries were held in ten other states plus American Samoa, while the Republican Party held primaries in eleven states including their own Vermont primary.

Senator Bernie Sanders won his home state in a landslide, receiving over 85% of the vote and winning all 16 of the state's pledged delegates.

== Opinion polling ==
Poll source	Date	1st	2nd	Other
Official Primary results	March 1, 2016	Bernie Sanders; 85.7%	Hillary Clinton; 13.6%	Others / Uncommitted; 0.8%
The Castleton Polling Institute Margin of error: ± 3.27; Sample size: 895	February 3–17, 2016	Bernie Sanders; 83.1%	Hillary Clinton; 9.0%	Others / Undecided 7.9%
Public Policy Polling Margin of error: ± 3.7; Sample size: 500	February 14–16, 2016	Bernie Sanders; 86%	Hillary Clinton; 10%	
Castleton University Margin of error: ± 4% Sample size: 617	August 24 – September 14, 2015	Bernie Sanders; 65%	Hillary Clinton; 14%	Others 10%, Not sure 11%
Castleton University Margin of error: ± 3.8% Sample size: 653	October 10, 2014	Bernie Sanders; 36%	Hillary Clinton; 29%	Neither 29%, Not sure 5%, Refused 1%

== Results ==
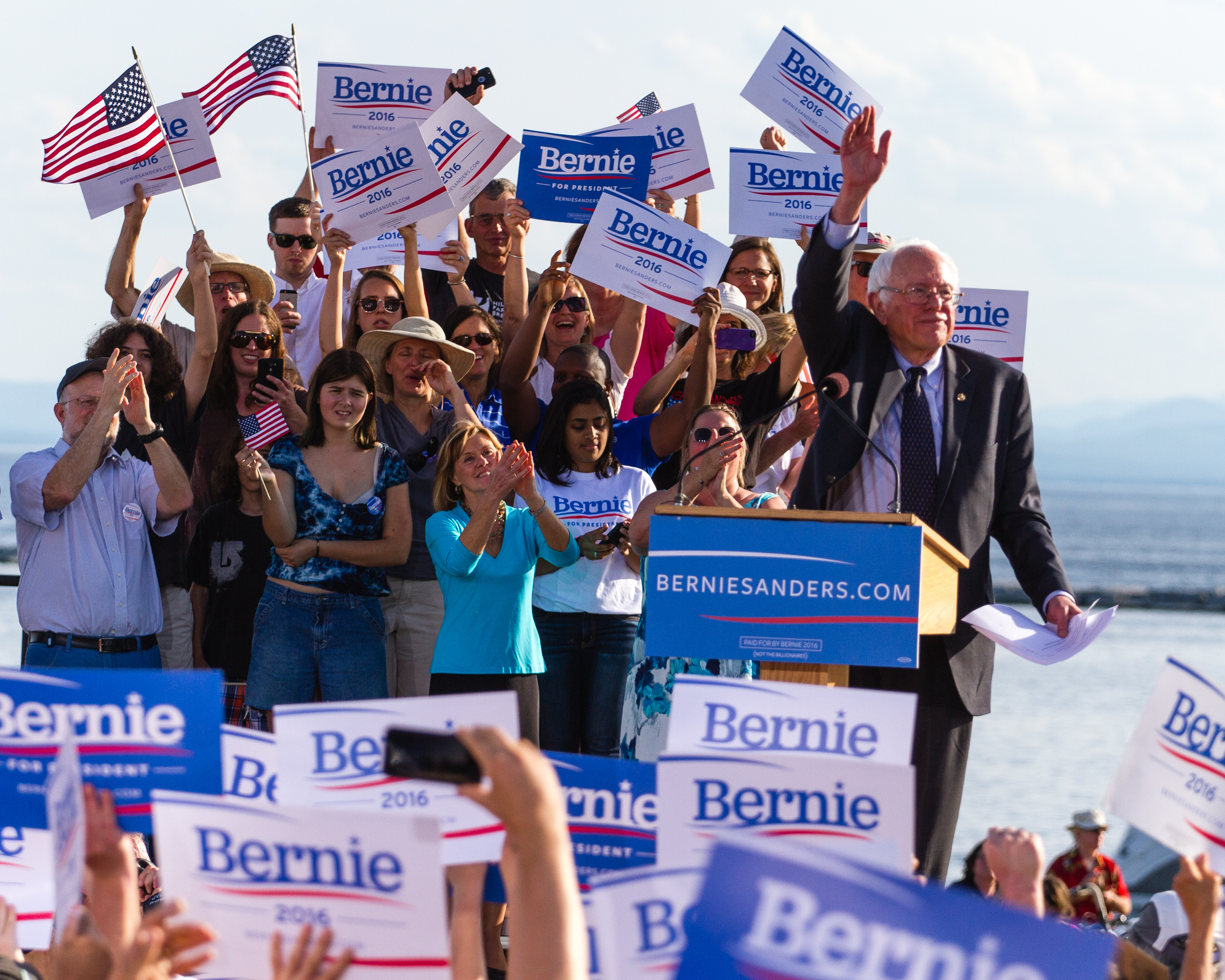
Sanders presidential campaign kickoff in his home state of Vermont, May 2015. Sanders would go on to win Vermont with over 85% of the vote.

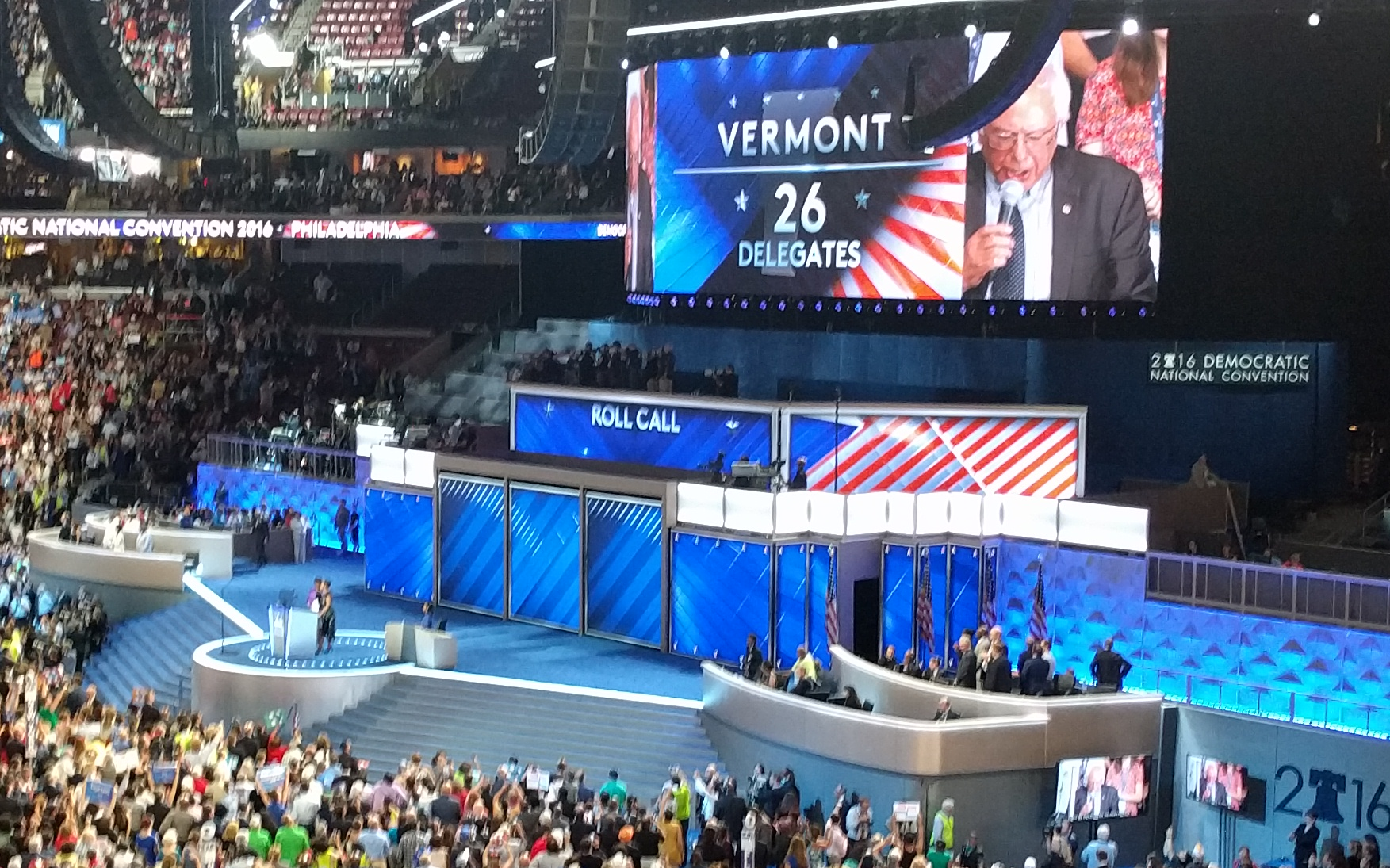
Vermont participates in the roll call vote at the 2016 Democratic National Convention

Primary date: March 1, 2016
National delegates: 26

Vermont Democratic primary, March 1, 2016
Candidate	Popular vote		Estimated delegates		
Candidate	Count	Percentage	Pledged	Unpledged	Total
Bernie Sanders	115,900	85.69%	16	6	22
Hillary Clinton	18,338	13.56%	0	4	4
Martin O'Malley (withdrawn)	282	0.21%			
Roque "Rocky" De La Fuente	80	0.06%			
Total blank votes	260	0.19%			
Total write-ins	238	0.18%			
Total spoiled votes	158	0.12%			
Uncommitted	—N/a		0	0	0
Total	135,256	100%	16	10	26

=== Results by county ===
County	Clinton	%	Sanders	%	Others	Totals	Turnout	Margin
Addison	1,111	12.5%	7,732	87.0%				
Bennington	1,255	17.9%	5,651	80.5%				
Caledonia	527	10.2%	4,598	89.0%				
Chittenden	5,687	14.9%	32,244	84.5%				
Essex	141	13.5%	890	85.1%				
Franklin	778	10.2%	6,746	88.8%				
Grand Isle	233	13.1%	1,529	85.6%				
Lamoille	574	11.3%	4,471	88.0%				
Orange	646	10.7%	5,402	88.8%				
Orleans	472	11.7%	3,540	87.6%				
Rutland	1,584	14.3%	9,354	84.6%				
Washington	1,717	12.2%	12,313	87.1%				
Windham	1,416	12.2%	10,085	87.2%				
Windsor	2,197	16.1%	11,345	83.3%				
Total	18,338	13.6%	115,900	85.7%				

== Analysis ==
Bernie Sanders won his largest victory of the entire 2016 primary season in his home state of Vermont, routing Hillary Clinton by a 72-point margin and therefore blocking her from collecting any pledged delegates from the state. He carried every county in the state. Sanders won all major demographics—age, gender, income and educational attainment levels. The electorate in Vermont was 95% white, with voters backing Sanders 86–13.

After voting in the primary, Sanders said of his chances in other Super Tuesday contests: "I am confident that if there is a large voter turnout today across this country, we will do well [...] If not we're going to be struggling."

== See also ==
- 2016 Vermont Republican presidential primary
