= 2020 Utah Democratic presidential primary =

- March 3, 2020

34 Democratic National Convention delegates (29 pledged with 19 on district-level and 10 statewide; 5 unpledged) The number of pledged delegates won is determined by the popular vote

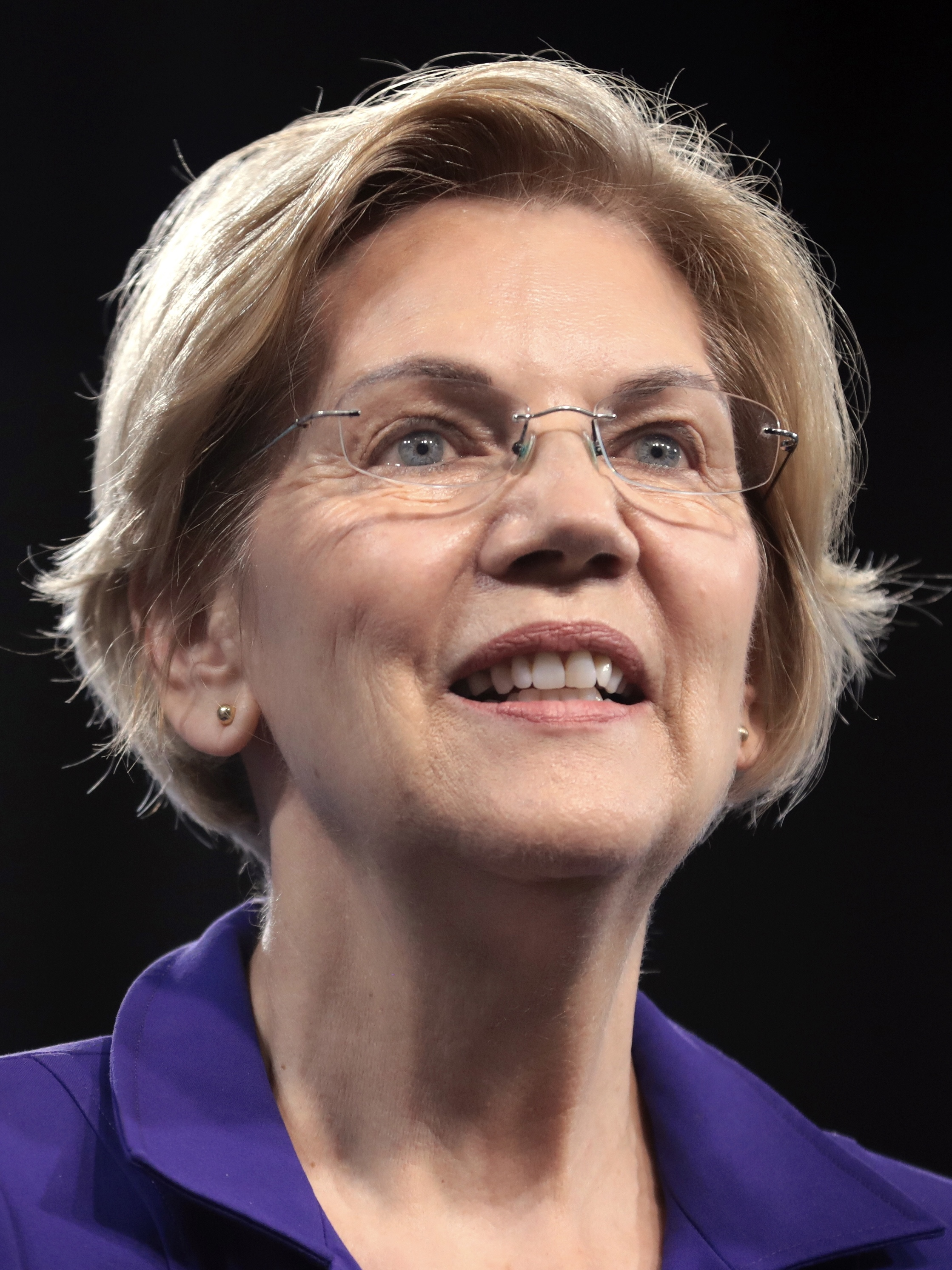

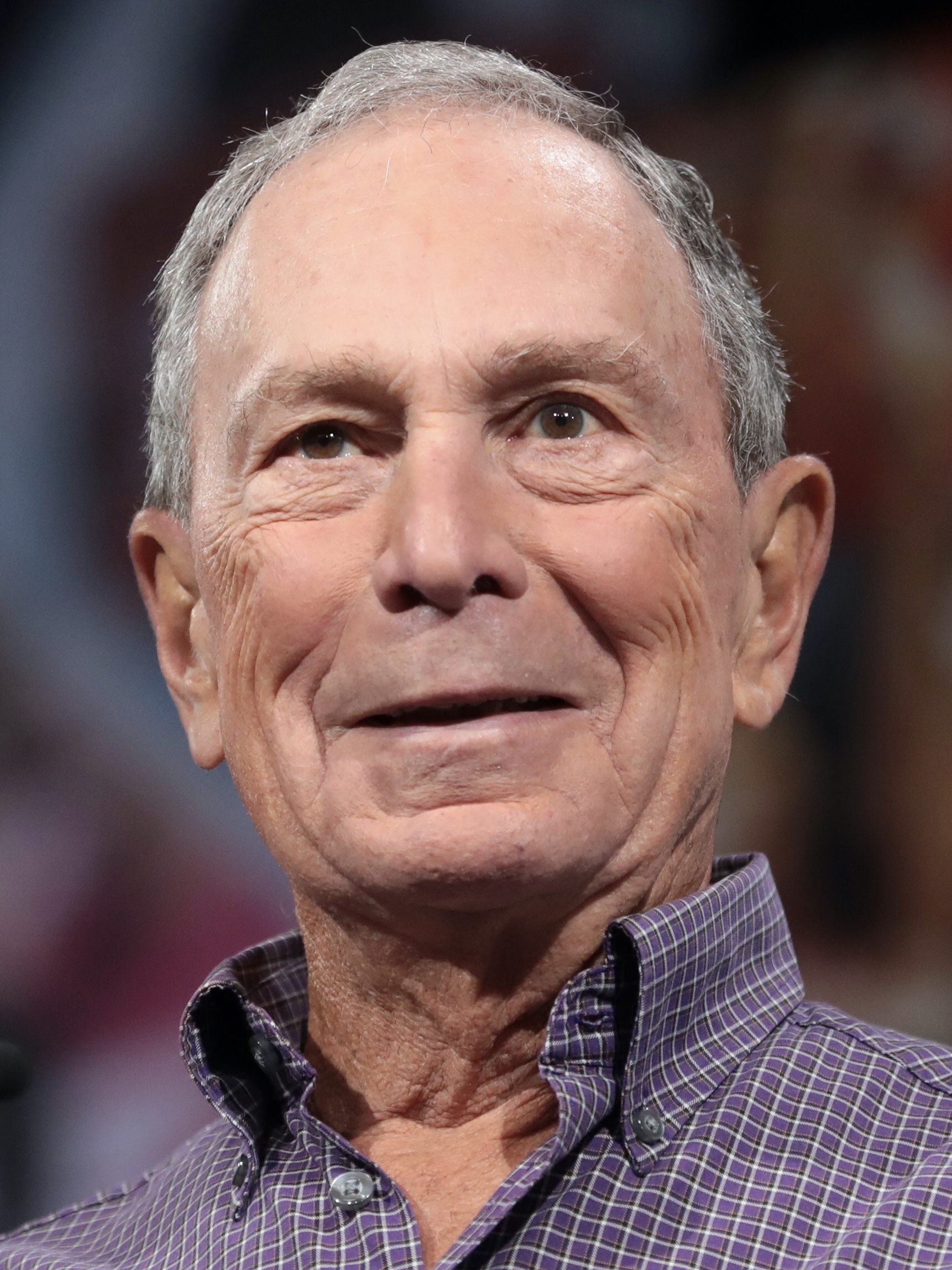

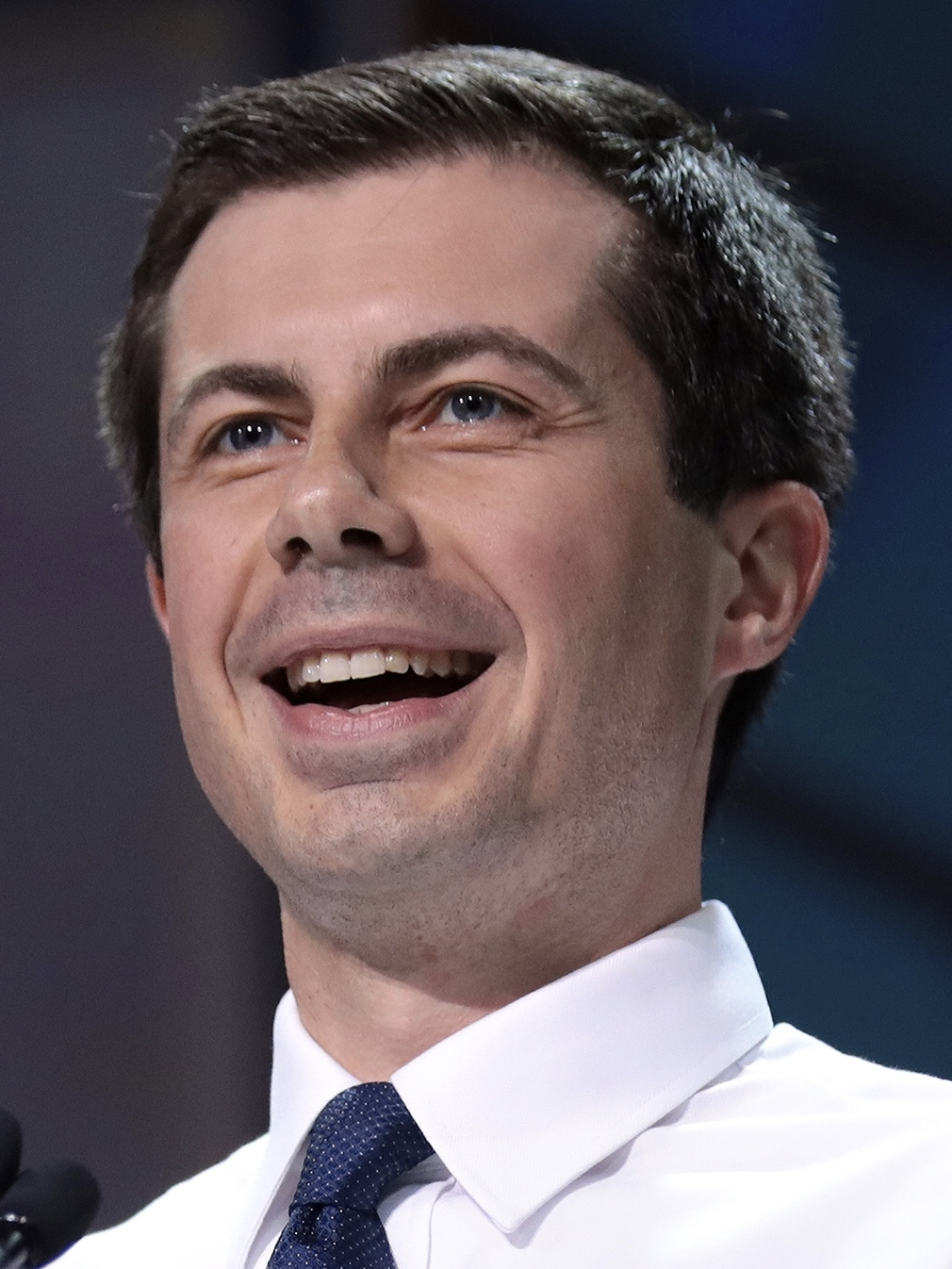
Candidate	Bernie Sanders	Joe Biden	Elizabeth Warren
Home state	Vermont	Delaware	Massachusetts
Delegate count	16	7	3
Popular vote	79,728	40,674	35,727
Percentage	36.14%	18.44%	16.20%
Candidate	Michael Bloomberg	Pete Buttigieg (withdrawn) (Note: Buttigieg withdrew on March 1, 2020, two days before the primary. Absentee and early voting had already occurred.)
Home state	New York	Indiana
Delegate count	3	0
Popular vote	33,991	18,734
Percentage	15.41%	8.49%
Election results by county
Joe Biden	Michael Bloomberg	Bernie Sanders

The 2020 Utah Democratic presidential primary took place on March 3, 2020, as one of 15 contests scheduled on Super Tuesday in the Democratic Party primaries for the 2020 presidential election, following the South Carolina primary the weekend before. The Utah primary was an open primary, with any registered voter able to participate. The primary awarded 34 delegates towards the 2020 Democratic National Convention, of which 29 were pledged delegates allocated on the basis of the results of the primary.

One of his four wins on Super Tuesday, senator Bernie Sanders placed first by a large margin with around 36% of the vote and won 16 delegates, while former vice president Joe Biden came in second with around 18% and 7 delegates. Utah was the only state on Super Tuesday where Biden did not improve his result compared to pre-election polls through the endorsements of Pete Buttigieg, Amy Klobuchar and others. Senator Elizabeth Warren and former mayor Michael Bloomberg both surpassed the 15% threshold and would have won 5 delegates each, but the Utah Democratic Party decided not to calculate statewide delegates for them because of their withdrawals in the following two days.

== Procedure ==
Utah was one of 14 states and one territory which held primaries on March 3, 2020, also known as "Super Tuesday", after the creation of a state-funded presidential primary option in a bill signed on March 22, 2017; a shift to a Super Tuesday contest by a few weeks after the signing of a bill shifting the primary date on March 27, 2019; and the confirmation that the Utah Democratic Party would opt to use the state-funded presidential primary rather than a party-run caucus as in 2016 on April 1, 2019.

Voting took place throughout the state from 7:00 a.m. until 8:00 p.m. In the primary, candidates had to meet a threshold of 15 percent at the congressional district or statewide level in order to be considered viable. The 29 pledged delegates to the 2020 Democratic National Convention were allocated proportionally on the basis of the results of the primary. Of these, between 4 and 6 were allocated to each of the state's 4 congressional districts and another 4 were allocated to party leaders and elected officials (PLEO delegates), in addition to 6 at-large delegates. The Super Tuesday primary as part of Stage I on the primary timetable received no bonus delegates, in order to disperse the primaries between more different date clusters and keep too many states from hoarding on the first shared date or on a March date in general.

After neighborhood caucuses selected delegates to county conventions in some counties on March 24, 2020, and county conventions elected delegates to the state convention between March 20, 2020, and April 4, 2020, the state convention was subsequently held from April 24 until April 25, 2020. The convention voted on national convention district delegates via delegates from a specific district, those national convention district delegates than voted on the 4 pledged PLEO delegates, and the state convention finally voted on the 6 at-large delegates for the national convention. The delegation also included 5 unpledged PLEO delegates: 4 members of the Democratic National Committee and a representative from Congress, Ben McAdams.

Pledged national convention delegates
Type	Del.
CD1	4
CD2	5
CD3	4
CD4	6
PLEO	4
At-large	6
Total pledged delegates	29

== Candidates ==
The following candidates were on the ballot in Utah:

Running

- Joe Biden
- Michael Bloomberg
- Nathan Bloxham
- Roque "Rocky" De La Fuente III
- Tulsi Gabbard
- Bernie Sanders
- Elizabeth Warren

Withdrawn

- Cory Booker
- Pete Buttigieg (Note: Candidate withdrew shortly before the primary after all-mail voting had started.)
- Julian Castro
- Amy Klobuchar
- Deval Patrick
- Tom Steyer
- Marianne Williamson
- Andrew Yang

Michael Bennet and Kamala Harris had been accepted as candidates but withdrew early enough so that they were not put on the ballot.

== Campaign ==
As one of the Super Tuesday states, the state had received relatively little attention by the national media. Campaign advertising was dominated by Michael Bloomberg, whose self-funded organization flooded the airwaves with ads, and Bernie Sanders, whose organization had roots in the state and who led in the only poll that was taken in January.

Bloomberg held a major rally in Salt Lake City on February 20, 2020 and Pete Buttigieg held one on February 17. Others may have had smaller events.

== Polling ==
Polling Aggregation
Source of poll aggregation	Date updated	Dates polled	Bernie Sanders	Joe Biden	Michael Bloomberg	Elizabeth Warren	Tulsi Gabbard	Other/ Undecided (Note: Calculated by taking the difference of 100% and all other candidates combined)
270 to Win	March 3, 2020	Feb 22–March 2, 2020	26.3%	21.7%	18.7%	13.3%	1.5%	20.0%
FiveThirtyEight	March 3, 2020	Until March 2, 2020 (Note: FiveThirtyEight aggregates polls with a trendline regression of polls rather than a strict average of recent polls.)	26.3%	20.0%	18.2%	14.6%	1.3%	20.9%
Average			26.3%	20.9%	18.5%	14.0%	1.4%	20.5%
Utah primary results (March 3, 2020)			36.1%	18.4%	15.4%	16.2%	0.8%	13.0%

Tabulation of individual polls of the 2020 Utah Democratic Primary
Poll source	Date(s) administered	Sample size (Note: Key: A – all adults RV – registered voters LV – likely voters V – unclear)	Margin of error	Joe Biden	Michael Bloomberg	Pete Buttigieg	Amy Klobuchar	Bernie Sanders	Elizabeth Warren	Andrew Yang	Other	Undecided
	Mar 2, 2020	Klobuchar withdraws from the race										
Swayable	Mar 1–2, 2020	143 (LV)	± 9.0%	27%	29%	7%	6%	22%	6%	–	2% (Note: Gabbard and Steyer with 1%; "Other" with 0%)	–
Data for Progress	Feb 28–Mar 2, 2020	622 (LV)	± 3.9%	23%	17%	7%	3%	29%	19%	–	2% (Note: Gabbard with 2%)	–
	Mar 1, 2020	Buttigieg withdraws from the race										
HarrisX/University of Utah/Deseret News	Feb 22–26, 2020	298 (LV)	± 5.7%	6%	19%	18%	4%	28%	15%	–	1% (Note: Not specified in release)	8%
	Feb 11, 2020	New Hampshire primary; Yang withdraws from the race										
Salt Lake Tribune/Suffolk	Jan 18–22, 2020	132 (LV)	± 8.5%	12%	10%	5%	3%	27%	14%	5%	4% (Note: Gabbard and Steyer with 1%)	21%

== Results ==
Results by county Sanders—<30% Sanders—30–40% Sanders—40–50% Biden—30–40% Bloomberg—<30% Tie—20—30%

2020 Utah Democratic presidential primary
Candidate	Votes	%	Delegates
Bernie Sanders	79,728	36.14	16 (Note: 13 delegates, if Warren's and Bloomberg's statewide delegates would have been calculated.)
Joe Biden	40,674	18.44	7 (Note: 6 delegates, if Warren's and Bloomberg's statewide delegates would have been calculated.)
Elizabeth Warren	35,727	16.20	3 (Note: 5 delegates, if Warren's and Bloomberg's statewide delegates would have been calculated.)
Michael Bloomberg	33,991	15.41	3 (Note: 5 delegates, if Warren's and Bloomberg's statewide delegates would have been calculated.)
Pete Buttigieg (withdrawn)	18,734	8.49	
Amy Klobuchar (withdrawn)	7,603	3.45	
Tulsi Gabbard	1,704	0.77	
Andrew Yang (withdrawn)	950	0.43	
Tom Steyer (withdrawn)	703	0.32	
Marianne Williamson (withdrawn)	220	0.10	
Julian Castro (withdrawn)	159	0.07	
Cory Booker (withdrawn)	138	0.06	
Deval Patrick (withdrawn)	55	0.02	
Other candidates	196	0.09	
Total	220,582	100%	29

=== Results by county ===
2020 Utah Democratic primary (results per county)
County	Bernie Sanders		Joe Biden		Elizabeth Warren		Michael Bloomberg		Pete Buttigieg		Amy Klobuchar		Tulsi Gabbard		Andrew Yang		Tom Steyer		Marianne Williamson		Julian Castro		Cory Booker		Roque De La Fuente III		Nathan Bloxham		Deval Patrick		Total votes cast
County	Votes	%	Votes	%	Votes	%	Votes	%	Votes	%	Votes	%	Votes	%	Votes	%	Votes	%	Votes	%	Votes	%	Votes	%	Votes	%	Votes	%	Votes	%	Total votes cast
Beaver	28	18.54	39	25.83	14	9.27	43	28.48	15	9.93	10	6.62	0	0.00	0	0.00	2	1.32	0	0.00	0	0.00	0	0.00	0	0.00	0	0.00	0	0.00	151
Box Elder	403	28.36	309	21.75	166	11.68	299	21.04	141	9.92	51	3.59	18	1.27	12	0.84	14	0.99	2	0.14	3	0.21	0	0.00	2	0.14	1	0.07	0	0.00	1,421
Cache	2,131	38.78	874	15.91	1,064	19.36	612	11.14	425	7.73	271	4.93	49	0.89	32	0.58	18	0.33	7	0.13	1	0.02	6	0.11	4	0.07	1	0.02	0	0.00	5,495
Carbon	267	22.01	353	29.10	137	11.29	254	20.94	115	9.48	48	3.96	13	1.07	4	0.33	10	0.82	3	0.25	2	0.16	1	0.08	4	0.33	1	0.08	1	0.08	1,213
Daggett	13	31.71	11	26.83	4	9.76	8	19.51	3	7.32	2	4.88	0	0.00	0	0.00	0	0.00	0	0.00	0	0.00	0	0.00	0	0.00	0	0.00	0	0.00	41
Davis	6,841	32.63	3,977	18.97	3,154	15.04	3,615	17.24	2,046	9.76	778	3.71	237	1.13	141	0.67	81	0.39	30	0.14	18	0.09	17	0.08	13	0.06	11	0.05	9	0.04	20,968
Duchesne	83	27.30	72	23.68	45	14.80	56	18.42	21	6.91	8	2.63	6	1.97	3	0.99	4	1.32	0	0.00	0	0.00	3	0.99	3	0.99	0	0.00	0	0.00	304
Emery	44	22.00	52	26.00	15	7.50	38	19.00	22	11.00	21	10.50	3	1.50	1	0.50	2	1.00	0	0.00	1	0.50	0	0.00	1	0.50	0	0.00	0	0.00	200
Garfield	77	33.77	25	10.96	56	24.56	29	12.72	21	9.21	12	5.26	3	1.32	2	0.88	1	0.44	0	0.00	0	0.00	2	0.88	0	0.00	0	0.00	0	0.00	228
Grand	618	41.90	213	14.44	295	20.00	146	9.90	101	6.85	80	5.42	15	1.02	3	0.20	2	0.14	1	0.07	0	0.00	1	0.07	0	0.00	0	0.00	0	0.00	1,475
Iron	598	32.89	391	21.51	294	16.17	246	13.53	154	8.47	82	4.51	23	1.27	14	0.77	7	0.39	4	0.22	0	0.00	1	0.06	4	0.22	0	0.00	0	0.00	1,818
Juab	54	24.22	55	24.66	18	8.07	64	28.70	16	7.17	9	4.04	1	0.45	4	1.79	1	0.45	0	0.00	1	0.45	0	0.00	0	0.00	0	0.00	0	0.00	223
Kane	195	33.51	96	16.49	101	17.35	87	14.95	51	8.76	37	6.36	4	0.69	4	0.69	3	0.52	0	0.00	1	0.17	2	0.34	0	0.00	0	0.00	1	0.17	582
Millard	33	14.60	61	26.99	22	9.73	61	26.99	21	9.29	17	7.52	3	1.33	0	0.00	2	0.88	0	0.00	2	0.88	2	0.88	1	0.44	1	0.44	0	0.00	226
Morgan	84	25.07	81	24.18	38	11.34	63	18.81	27	8.06	26	7.76	8	2.39	0	0.00	1	0.30	1	0.30	0	0.00	2	0.60	3	0.90	1	0.30	0	0.00	335
Piute	5	19.23	5	19.23	2	7.69	7	26.92	3	11.54	2	7.69	1	3.85	0	0.00	0	0.00	0	0.00	0	0.00	0	0.00	0	0.00	1	3.85	0	0.00	26
Rich	12	22.22	20	37.04	4	7.41	7	12.96	6	11.11	4	7.41	0	0.00	0	0.00	1	1.85	0	0.00	0	0.00	0	0.00	0	0.00	0	0.00	0	0.00	54
Salt Lake	48,183	38.51	21,661	17.31	21,002	16.79	18,311	14.64	10,517	8.41	3,777	3.02	694	0.55	366	0.29	310	0.25	88	0.07	62	0.05	49	0.04	48	0.04	25	0.02	18	0.01	125,111
San Juan	495	43.23	210	18.34	107	9.34	197	17.21	54	4.72	29	2.53	5	0.44	19	1.66	11	0.96	4	0.35	5	0.44	5	0.44	0	0.00	2	0.17	2	0.17	1,145
Sanpete	198	34.55	96	16.75	83	14.49	89	15.53	56	9.77	30	5.24	9	1.57	4	0.70	5	0.87	1	0.17	0	0.00	0	0.00	1	0.17	1	0.17	0	0.00	573
Sevier	87	24.44	84	23.60	45	12.64	84	23.60	32	8.99	17	4.78	0	0.00	2	0.56	2	0.56	0	0.00	0	0.00	1	0.28	0	0.00	1	0.28	1	0.28	356
Summit	1,565	22.56	1,632	23.53	1,009	14.55	1,652	23.82	704	10.15	294	4.24	27	0.39	12	0.17	21	0.30	4	0.06	3	0.04	7	0.10	3	0.04	1	0.01	2	0.03	6,936
Tooele	917	33.27	600	21.77	338	12.26	526	19.09	230	8.35	79	2.87	27	0.98	20	0.73	6	0.22	4	0.15	4	0.15	1	0.04	2	0.07	1	0.04	1	0.04	2,756
Uintah	208	27.44	158	20.84	95	12.53	127	16.75	90	11.87	41	5.41	16	2.11	7	0.92	4	0.53	3	0.40	1	0.13	1	0.13	3	0.40	2	0.26	2	0.26	758
Utah	8,596	36.91	4,359	18.72	4,350	18.68	2,799	12.02	1,587	6.81	849	3.65	373	1.60	204	0.88	65	0.28	35	0.15	23	0.10	12	0.05	17	0.07	7	0.03	11	0.05	23,287
Wasatch	640	29.14	489	22.27	274	12.48	468	21.31	208	9.47	73	3.32	18	0.82	9	0.41	7	0.32	3	0.14	0	0.00	4	0.18	3	0.14	0	0.00	0	0.00	2,196
Washington	2,298	26.06	2,055	23.31	1,077	12.22	1,753	19.88	896	10.16	515	5.84	68	0.77	31	0.35	75	0.85	16	0.18	9	0.10	9	0.10	9	0.10	5	0.06	1	0.01	8,817
Wayne	45	27.61	24	14.72	37	22.70	27	16.56	13	7.98	13	7.98	0	0.00	1	0.61	1	0.61	0	0.00	2	1.23	0	0.00	0	0.00	0	0.00	0	0.00	163
Weber	5,010	36.51	2,672	19.47	1,881	13.71	2,323	16.93	1,159	8.45	428	3.12	83	0.60	55	0.40	47	0.34	14	0.10	21	0.15	12	0.09	6	0.04	7	0.05	6	0.04	13,724
Total	79,728	36.14	40,674	18.44	35,727	16.20	33,991	15.41	18,734	8.49	7,603	3.45	1,704	0.77	950	0.43	703	0.32	220	0.10	159	0.07	138	0.06	127	0.06	69	0.03	55	0.02	220,582

== See also ==
- 2020 Utah Republican presidential primary
