= 2016 Vermont Republican presidential primary =

- March 1, 2016

16 pledged delegates to the 2016 Republican National Convention
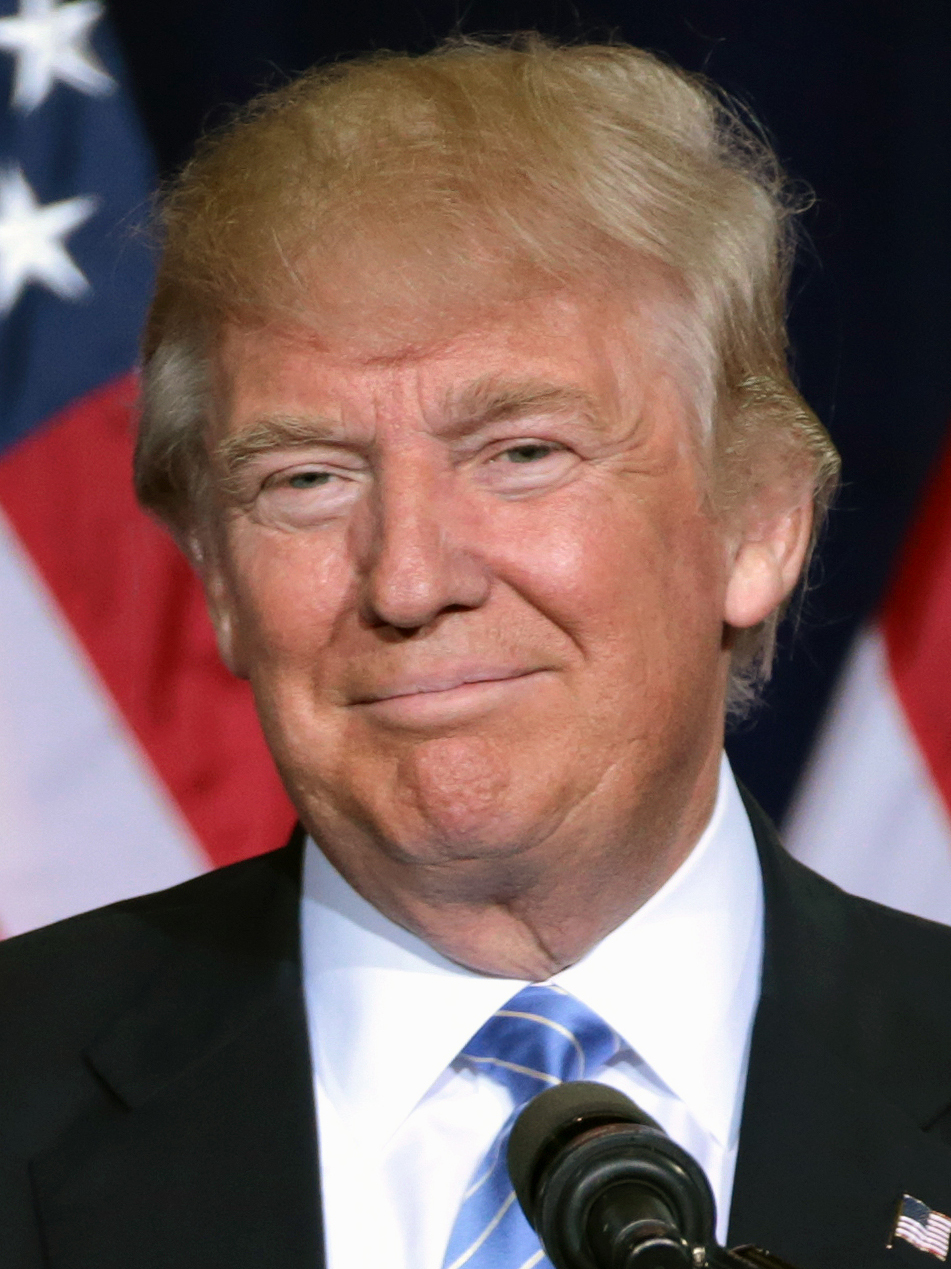

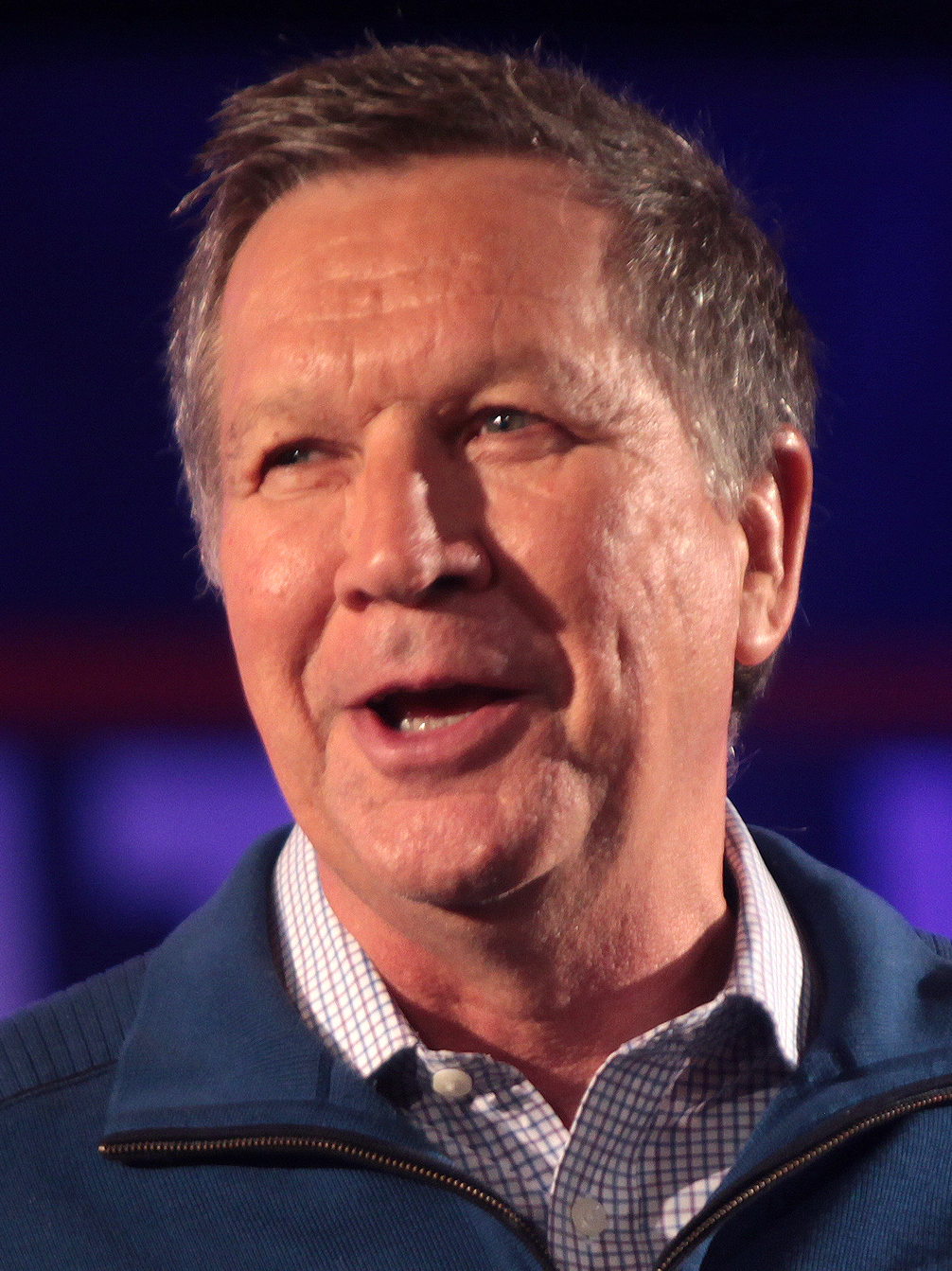

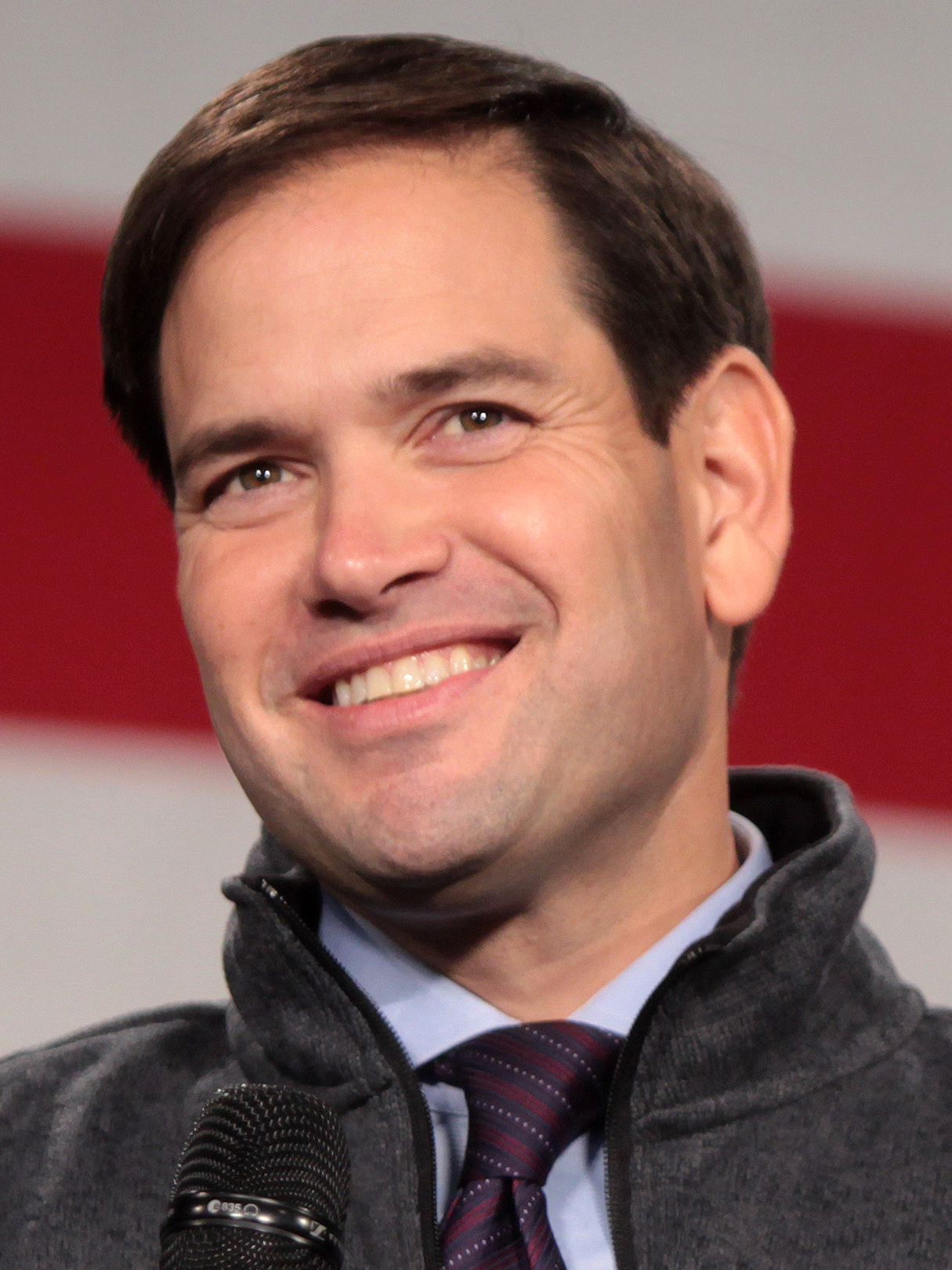

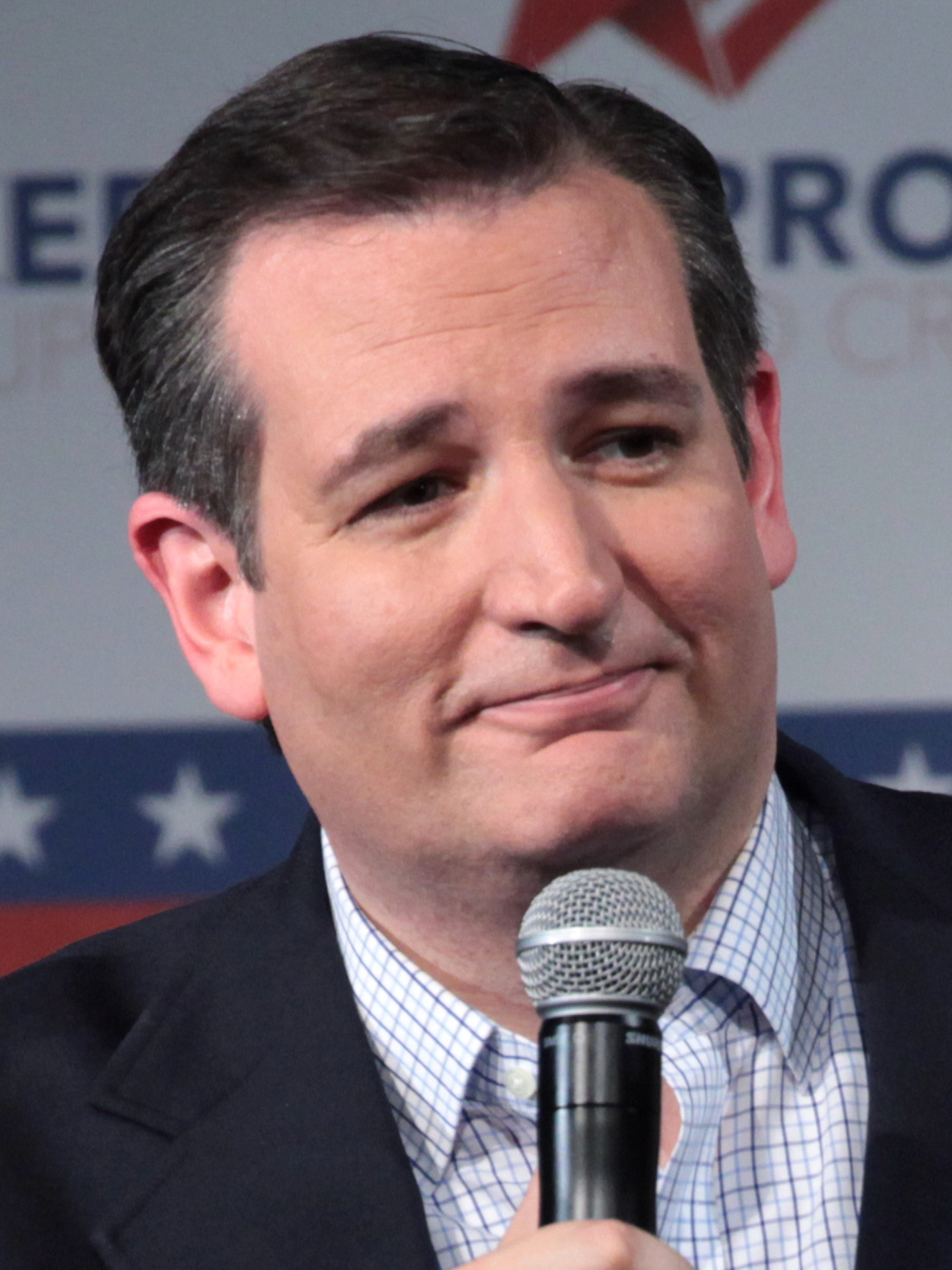
Candidate	Donald Trump	John Kasich
Home state	New York	Ohio
Delegate count	8	8
Popular vote	19,974	18,534
Percentage	32.34%	30.01%
Candidate	Marco Rubio	Ted Cruz
Home state	Florida	Texas
Delegate count	0	0
Popular vote	11,781	5,932
Percentage	19.08%	9.61%

The 2016 Vermont Republican presidential primary was held on March 1, 2016, along with ten other state nominating contests during Super Tuesday.

Donald Trump held a big edge in Vermont polls, with John Kasich and Marco Rubio splitting much of the rest of the vote. However, on election day, Donald Trump only narrowly won the popular vote by 2.3%, and tied with John Kasich in the delegate count. Vermont was one of only three states, along with his native Ohio and neighboring Michigan, where Kasich won a county.

This was the only GOP primary contest that Trump won in 2016 that he would lose in 2024, by 4 points to Nikki Haley.

== Polling ==
Poll source	Date	1st	2nd	3rd	Other
Primary results	March 1, 2016	Donald Trump32.34%	John Kasich30.01%	Marco Rubio19.08%	Ted Cruz 9.61%, Ben Carson 4.13%, Jeb Bush 1.79%, Rand Paul 0.68%, Chris Christie 0.58%, Carly Fiorina 0.34%, Rick Santorum 0.27%
Castleton University/Vermont Public Radio Margin of error: ± 9.01% Sample size: 118	February 3–17, 2016	Donald Trump; 32.4%	Marco Rubio 16.9%	Ted Cruz 10.5%	John Kasich 10.0%, Jeb Bush 7.7%, Ben Carson 3.1%, Chris Christie 2.4%, Carly Fiorina 1.0%, Rick Santorum 0.6%, Someone else 3.3%, Not sure/Don't know 12.1%

== Results ==
2016 Vermont Republican presidential primary
Candidate	Vote		Delegates
Candidate	#	%	Delegates
Donald Trump	19,974	32.52	8
John Kasich	18,534	30.17	8
Marco Rubio	11,781	19.18	0
Ted Cruz	5,932	9.66	0
Ben Carson	2,551	4.15	0
Jeb Bush (withdrawn)	1,106	1.80	0
Rand Paul (withdrawn)	423	0.69	0
Chris Christie (withdrawn)	361	0.59	0
Carly Fiorina (withdrawn)	212	0.35	0
Rick Santorum (withdrawn)	164	0.27	0
Write-ins	390	0.63	0
Total valid votes	61,428	100%	16

Delegates were awarded to candidates who got 20% or more of the vote proportionally.

== Analysis ==
Vermont's voter base is much more moderate and irreligious than the Southern Super Tuesday contests. Exit polls by Edison Research showed this benefitted Trump and Kasich: Trump carried somewhat conservative voters with 35% of the vote, but John Kasich won moderates with 40% to Trump's 34%. Kasich did particularly well in the populous Burlington metro, holding Trump to a narrow margin statewide.

Turnout dropped in the Vermont Republican primary compared with 2012, as some registered Republicans crossed over to vote for favorite son Bernie Sanders in the Democratic primary.

== See also ==
- 2016 Vermont Democratic presidential primary
