= List of United States cities by foreign-born population =

List of U.S. cities over 200,000 population, by foreign-born population, 2009 This table covers only central cities, not metropolitan areas. Source: U.S. Census

City	Total pop.	Foreign-born (FB) pop.	FB % of total	Rank by FB %
Hialeah, Florida	218,901	162,951	74.4	1
Miami, Florida	433,143	244,352	56.4	2
Santa Ana, California	340,378	166,960	49.1	3
Fremont, California	205,521	88,211	42.9	4
Los Angeles, California	3,831,880	1,521,119	39.7	5
San Jose, California	964,679	367,711	38.1	6
Anaheim, California	337,899	127,111	37.6	7
New York, New York	8,391,881	2,996,580	35.7	8
Irvine, California	209,707	74,225	35.4	9
Jersey City, New Jersey	242,513	84,583	34.9	10
Irving, Texas	205,549	70,263	34.2	11
San Francisco, California	815,358	278,369	34.1	12
Chula Vista, California	223,746	71,797	32.1	13
Hudson Valley, New York	201,073	62,818	31.2	14
Oakland, California	409,151	116,794	28.5	15
Houston, Texas	2,260,918	644,167	28.5	16
Laredo, Texas	226,419	62,653	27.7	17
Stockton, California	287,584	79,511	27.6	18
Garland, Texas	222,013	60,187	27.1	19
Long Beach, California	462,594	124,340	26.9	20
Newark, New Jersey	278,157	74,762	26.9	21
Honolulu, Hawaii (CDP)	374,658	96,752	25.8	22
Paradise, Nevada (CDP)	202,987	51,090	25.2	23
Boston, Massachusetts	645,187	161,740	25.1	24
San Diego, California	1,306,228	325,819	24.9	25
North Las Vegas, Nevada	224,416	55,805	24.9	26
Dallas, Texas	1,299,590	322,072	24.8	27
El Paso, Texas	620,440	151,295	24.4	28
Riverside, California	297,863	69,792	23.4	29
Plano, Texas	273,381	62,217	22.8	30
Aurora, Colorado	323,288	70,747	21.9	31
Sacramento, California	466,685	102,076	21.9	32
Arlington, Virginia (CDP)	217,483	47,379	21.8	33
Phoenix, Arizona	1,593,660	346,430	21.7	34
Las Vegas, Nevada	567,610	119,437	21	35
Chicago, Illinois	2,850,502	588,480	20.6	36
Fresno, California	479,911	97,316	20.3	37
Austin, Texas	790,593	159,353	20.2	38
Arlington, Texas	380,072	76,440	20.1	39
Fort Worth, Texas	731,588	131,197	17.9	40
Reno, Nevada	219,649	37,964	17.3	41
Seattle, Washington	616,669	105,154	17.1	42
Tucson, Arizona	543,907	90,794	16.7	43
Orlando, Florida	235,876	39,210	16.6	44
Bakersfield, California	324,479	53,480	16.5	45
Denver, Colorado	610,345	95,585	15.7	46
Minneapolis, Minnesota	385,384	59,093	15.3	47
St. Paul, Minnesota	281,244	42,669	15.2	48
Modesto, California	202,740	30,464	15	49
Tampa, Florida	343,879	50,377	14.6	50
Glendale, Arizona	253,210	36,197	14.3	51
Charlotte, North Carolina	704,417	96,734	13.7	52
San Antonio, Texas	1,373,677	180,895	13.2	53
Durham, North Carolina	229,147	30,174	13.2	54
Raleigh, North Carolina	405,197	53,154	13.1	55
Scottsdale, Arizona	237,834	30,074	12.6	56
Chandler, Arizona	249,515	31,551	12.6	57
Portland, Oregon	566,606	71,380	12.6	58
Mesa, Arizona	467,178	56,895	12.2	59
Washington, D.C.	599,657	72,110	12	60
Henderson, Nevada	256,424	30,462	11.9	61
Nashville-Davidson, Tennessee	605,466	70,404	11.6	62
Philadelphia, Pennsylvania	1,547,297	179,444	11.6	63
Winston-Salem, North Carolina	229,826	26,064	11.3	64
Oklahoma City, Oklahoma	560,226	63,199	11.3	65
Albuquerque, New Mexico	529,216	57,298	10.8	66
Columbus, Ohio	773,021	83,091	10.7	67
Des Moines, Iowa	200,569	21,050	10.5	68
Greensboro, North Carolina	255,141	26,410	10.4	69
St. Petersburg, Florida	244,318	25,094	10.3	70
Milwaukee, Wisconsin	605,027	59,785	9.9	71
Anchorage, Alaska (municipality)	286,174	27,107	9.5	72
Omaha, Nebraska	454,714	43,029	9.5	73
Tulsa, Oklahoma	389,369	36,514	9.4	74
Gilbert, Arizona (town)	222,092	20,606	9.3	75
Jacksonville, Florida	813,518	73,992	9.1	76
Wichita, Kansas	372,194	33,608	9	77
Boise City, Idaho	205,698	18,221	8.9	78
Madison, Wisconsin	235,410	20,736	8.8	79
Virginia Beach, Virginia	433,575	36,727	8.5	80
Corpus Christi, Texas	287,231	23,315	8.1	81
Lexington-Fayette, Kentucky (urban county)	296,545	23,967	8.1	82
Indianapolis (balance), Indiana	807,640	63,241	7.8	83
Colorado Springs, Colorado	399,803	31,266	7.8	84
Fort Wayne, Indiana	251,825	19,055	7.6	85
Atlanta, Georgia	740,932	99,733	7.5	86
Buffalo, New York	270,221	19,618	7.3	87
Kansas City, Missouri	482,228	34,085	7.1	88
Lincoln, Nebraska	254,008	17,128	6.7	89
Detroit, Michigan	910,848	60,170	6.6	90
Rochester, New York	207,291	13,454	6.5	91
Baltimore, Maryland	637,418	41,343	6.5	92
Pittsburgh, Pennsylvania	311,640	19,993	6.4	93
Norfolk, Virginia	233,333	14,562	6.2	94
Richmond, Virginia	204,451	12,301	6	95
St. Louis, Missouri	356,587	21,177	5.9	96
Spokane, Washington	203,268	11,562	5.7	97
Louisville, Kentucky ("balance")	566,492	31,315	5.5	98
Memphis, Tennessee	676,646	36,519	5.4	99
New Orleans, Louisiana	354,850	18,968	5.3	100
Lubbock, Texas	225,865	10,709	4.7	101
Akron, Ohio	207,208	9,526	4.6	102
Baton Rouge, Louisiana	225,388	10,235	4.5	103
Cleveland, Ohio	431,369	19,495	4.5	104
Chesapeake, Virginia	222,455	9,838	4.4	105
Birmingham, Alabama	231,824	8,883	3.8	106
Cincinnati, Ohio	333,013	11,471	3.4	107
Toledo, Ohio	316,164	8,793	2.8	108
Montgomery, Alabama	201,465	5,454	2.7	109

== See also ==
- List of U.S. states and territories by immigrant population
