= 2020 Utah Republican presidential primary =

- March 3, 2020

40 Republican National Convention delegates

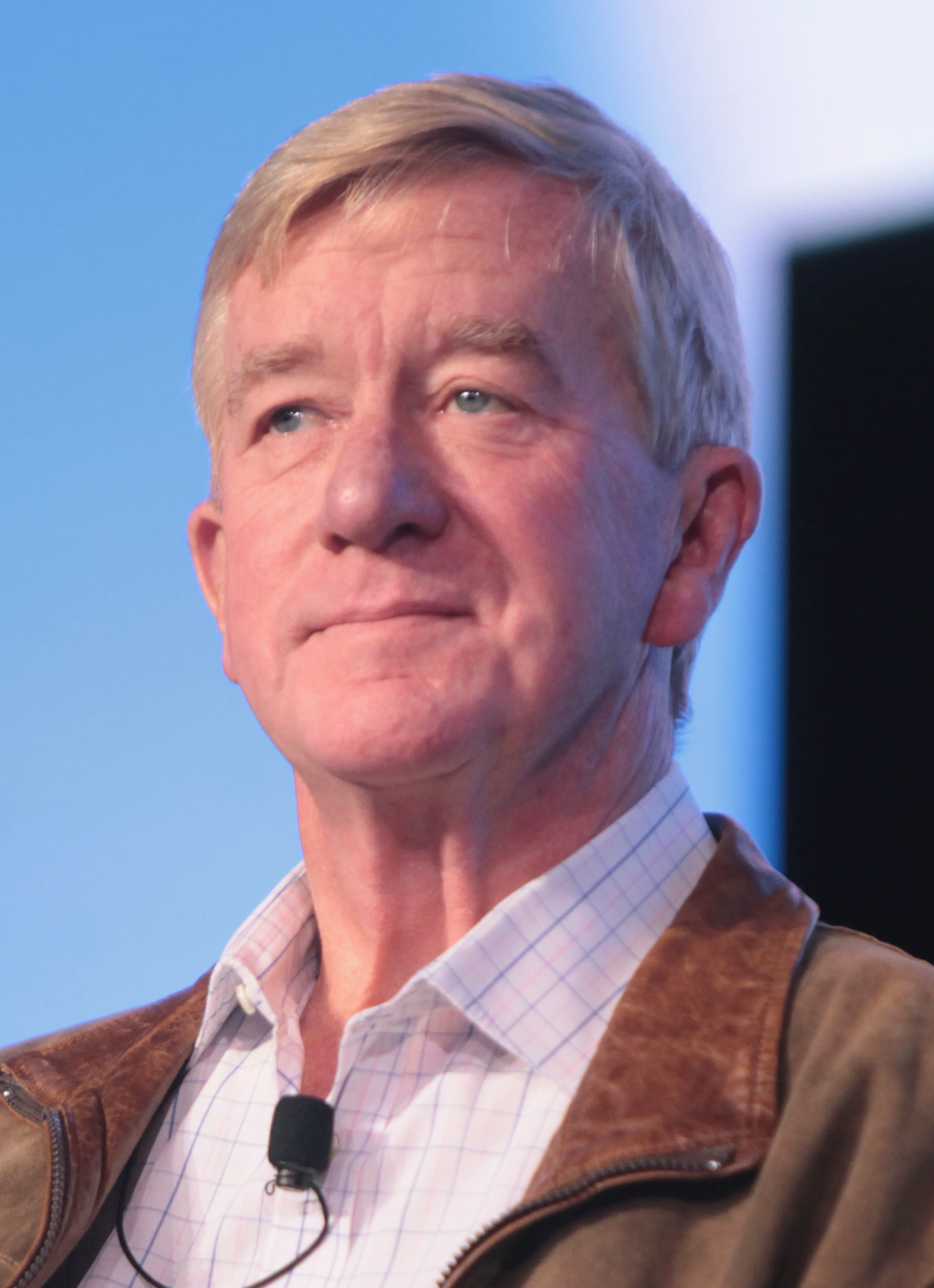
Candidate	Donald Trump	Bill Weld
Home state	Florida	Massachusetts
Delegate count	40	0
Popular vote	302,751	23,652
Percentage	87.79%	6.86%
County results
Trump
80 – 90%
>90%

The 2020 Utah Republican presidential primary took place on Super Tuesday, March 3, 2020.

== Results ==
Incumbent United States President Donald Trump was challenged by five candidates: retired advertising executive Robert Ardini of New York, entrepreneur and investor Bob Ely of Massachusetts, entrepreneur and attorney Matthew John Matern of Louisiana, former congressman Joe Walsh of Illinois, and former governor Bill Weld of Massachusetts. Businessman and perennial candidate Rocky De La Fuente was also initially on the ballot, but later withdrew his name to avoid a 'sore loser' law.

2020 Utah Republican presidential primary
Candidate	Votes	%	Estimated delegates
Donald Trump (incumbent)	302,751	87.79%	40
Bill Weld	23,652	6.86%	0
Joe Walsh (withdrawn)	7,509	2.18%	0
Matthew John Matern	5,751	1.67%	0
Robert Ardini	3,971	1.15%	0
Bob Ely	1,218	0.35%	0
Total	344,852	100%	40

=== Results by county ===
2020 Utah Republican primary (results per county)
County	Donald Trump		Bill Weld		Joe Walsh		Matthew John Matern		Robert Ardini		Bob Ely		Total votes cast
County	Votes	%	Votes	%	Votes	%	Votes	%	Votes	%	Votes	%	Total votes cast
Beaver	1,318	97.63	13	0.96	9	0.67	3	0.22	3	0.22	4	0.30	1,350
Box Elder	7,574	90.75	367	4.40	180	2.16	123	1.47	74	0.89	28	0.34	8,346
Cache	12,978	87.71	1,009	6.82	320	2.16	278	1.88	158	1.07	53	0.36	14,796
Carbon	2,002	95.61	40	1.91	21	1.00	8	0.38	17	0.81	6	0.29	2,094
Daggett	235	91.44	14	5.45	5	1.95	1	0.39	1	0.39	1	0.39	257
Davis	37,488	84.84	3,678	8.32	1,152	2.61	970	2.20	731	1.65	169	0.38	44,188
Duchesne	3,608	96.89	65	1.75	25	0.67	18	0.48	5	0.13	3	0.08	3,724
Emery	1,590	96.13	31	1.87	21	1.27	5	0.30	6	0.36	1	0.06	1,654
Garfield	1,264	94.12	30	2.23	29	2.16	13	0.97	5	0.37	2	0.15	1,343
Grand	1,041	90.29	58	5.03	27	2.34	6	0.52	16	1.39	5	0.43	1,153
Iron	7,775	94.36	230	2.79	126	1.53	64	0.78	28	0.34	17	0.21	8,240
Juab	1,771	95.52	40	2.16	18	0.97	11	0.59	9	0.49	5	0.27	1,854
Kane	1,595	94.38	47	2.78	20	1.18	15	0.89	7	0.41	6	0.36	1,690
Millard	2,712	95.43	59	2.08	37	1.30	8	0.28	22	0.77	4	0.14	2,842
Morgan	1,857	91.16	92	4.52	38	1.87	24	1.18	21	1.03	5	0.25	2,037
Piute	462	97.26	4	0.84	5	1.05	2	0.42	2	0.42	0	0.00	475
Rich	646	95.00	13	1.91	13	1.91	4	0.59	2	0.29	2	0.29	680
Salt Lake	74,980	83.41	8,514	9.47	2,639	2.94	1,999	2.22	1,303	1.45	461	0.51	89,896
San Juan	1,680	93.54	45	2.51	35	1.95	15	0.84	16	0.89	5	0.28	1,796
Sanpete	4,717	93.89	181	3.60	55	1.09	41	0.82	20	0.40	10	0.20	5,024
Sevier	4,195	96.28	71	1.63	41	0.94	19	0.44	16	0.37	15	0.34	4,357
Summit	3,439	86.36	350	8.79	99	2.49	37	0.93	44	1.10	13	0.33	3,982
Tooele	6,369	90.26	341	4.83	147	2.08	103	1.46	76	1.08	20	0.28	7,056
Uintah	6,338	96.75	98	1.50	51	0.78	37	0.56	18	0.27	9	0.14	6,551
Utah	61,258	86.61	5,841	8.26	1,328	1.88	1,272	1.80	827	1.17	201	0.28	70,727
Wasatch	3,685	89.97	207	5.05	98	2.39	57	1.39	42	1.03	7	0.17	4,096
Washington	27,949	94.73	769	2.61	333	1.13	198	0.67	184	0.62	71	0.24	29,504
Wayne	693	93.90	26	3.52	7	0.95	3	0.41	5	0.68	4	0.54	738
Weber	21,532	88.24	1,419	5.82	630	2.58	417	1.71	313	1.28	91	0.37	24,402
Total	302,751	87.79	23,652	6.86	7,509	2.18	5,751	1.67	3,971	1.15	1,218	0.35	344,852

== See also ==
- 2020 Utah Democratic presidential primary
