= List of U.S. states and territories by immigrant population =

This is a list of U.S. states and the District of Columbia by immigrant population.

Immigrant population is defined as "foreign-born," which means "anyone who is not a U.S. citizen at birth."

== Foreign-born population ==
U.S. states by foreign-born population (2023)
State	Total foreign-born population	Foreign-born population (%)
Alabama	203,143	4.0
Alaska	54,571	7.4
Arizona	980,927	13.2
Arkansas	162,340	5.3
California	10,640,017	27.3
Colorado	563,101	9.6
Connecticut	590,608	16.3
Delaware	115,129	11.2
District of Columbia	95,435	14.1
Florida	4,996,874	22.1
Georgia	1,974,462	14.6
Hawaii	255,755	17.8
Idaho	112,009	5.7
Illinois	1,878,890	15.0
Indiana	432,652	6.3
Iowa	188,605	5.9
Kansas	207,421	7.1
Kentucky	201,672	4.5
Louisiana	222,672	4.9
Maine	53,448	3.8
Maryland	1,051,891	17.0
Massachusetts	1,263,580	18.0
Michigan	737,552	7.3
Minnesota	495,352	8.6
Mississippi	75,165	2.6
Missouri	296,832	4.8
Montana	24,623	2.2
Nebraska	152,341	7.7
Nevada	614,779	19.2
New Hampshire	94,873	6.8
New Jersey	2,250,431	24.2
New Mexico	215,697	10.2
New York	4,517,996	23.1
North Carolina	995,127	9.2
North Dakota	31,096	4.0
Ohio	621,863	5.3
Oklahoma	247,828	6.1
Oregon	406,692	9.6
Pennsylvania	1,031,320	8.0
Rhode Island	161,196	14.7
South Carolina	316,438	5.9
South Dakota	39,943	4.3
Tennessee	432,020	6.1
Texas	5,455,292	17.9
Utah	303,784	8.9
Vermont	29,047	4.5
Virginia	1,163,486	13.3
Washington	1,213,933	15.5
West Virginia	32,326	1.8
Wisconsin	307,899	5.2
Wyoming	21,278	3.6

== See also ==
- List of sovereign states and dependent territories by immigrant population
- List of United States cities by foreign-born population
