= Rocky De La Fuente =

American businessman and perennial candidate (born 1954)

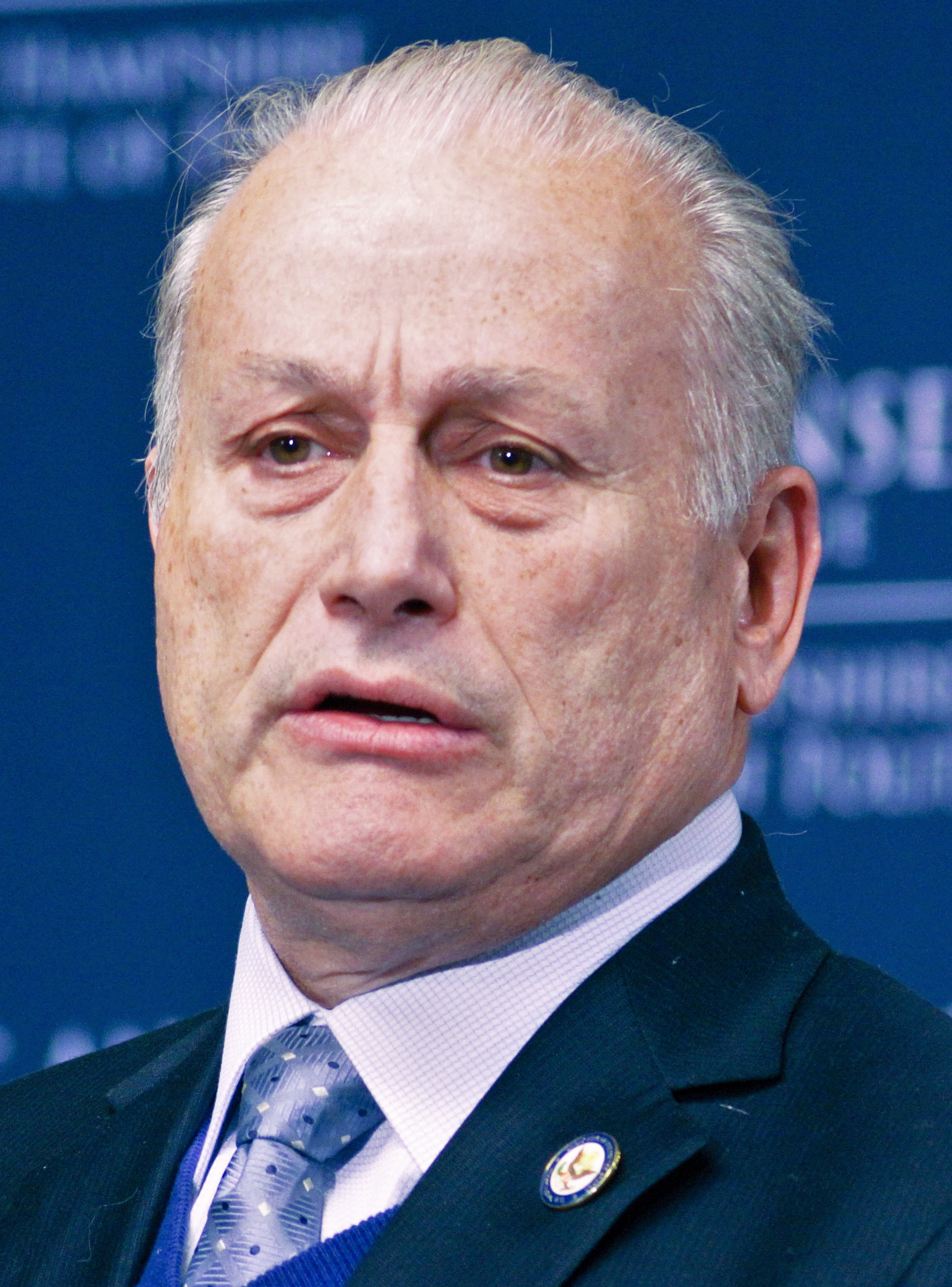
- De La Fuente in 2016
- Born: Roque De La Fuente Guerra; October 10, 1954 (age 72); San Diego, California, U.S.
- Education: National Autonomous University of Mexico
- Political party: Republican (2018–present); Alliance (2020–present); Democratic (2016–2017); Reform (2016, 2020); American Delta (2016)
- Spouse: Katayoun Yazdani
- Children: 5

Roque "Rocky" De La Fuente Guerra (born October 10, 1954) is an American businessman who has sought elected office. A perennial candidate, De La Fuente was the Reform Party nominee in the 2016 and 2020 United States presidential elections; he also appeared on his own American Delta Party's presidential ticket in 2016, and on those of the Alliance Party and American Independent Party in 2020.

De La Fuente unsuccessfully sought the Democratic nomination for president in 2016, and the Republican nomination in 2020. He has also run for Congress numerous times, losing primaries for United States Senate in nine states simultaneously in 2018. He also lost the March 2020 primary for the U.S. House of Representatives seat for California's 21st congressional district. He has campaigned as a critic of President Donald Trump's immigration policies.

== Early life and education ==
De La Fuente was born on October 10, 1954, at Mercy Hospital in San Diego, California, the son of automobile dealer and business park developer Roque Antonio De La Fuente Alexander (circa 1923 – 2002) and Bertha Guerra Yzaguirre. His parents raised him in Mexico (Mexico City, Tijuana, Baja California), and in the United States (San Diego and Anaheim). He was educated by his parents and the Legionaries of Christ, the Marist Brothers, the Carmelite Sisters of the Most Sacred Heart, Daughters of the Holy Spirit and the Jesuits.

De La Fuente earned a B.S. in physics and mathematics from the National Autonomous University of Mexico, and studied accounting and business administration at Anahuac University near Mexico City.

== Career ==
Between 1976 and 1990 (when he took over his father's automobile dealerships after his father had had a stroke), De La Fuente acquired 28 automobile franchises for Alfa Romeo, American Motors Corporation, Audi, Cadillac, Chrysler, Daihatsu, Dodge, GMC, Honda, and other brands. He also opened three banks (one national bank approved by the OCC and two state charter banks approved by the California Banking Commission and the FDIC), assisted living facilities in Los Angeles and Lemon Grove, California, and eleven currency exchange locations in the United States and Mexico.

In 1997, De La Fuente received a settlement of $38.7 million from San Diego County for 524 acres of land belonging to him and his father that the county had taken to build a new county jail.

In 2004, the Federal Deposit Insurance Corporation issued an order barring De La Fuente from participating in any FDIC-insured institution. De La Fuente appealed and the 9th Circuit reversed the order in part and advised the FDIC to reconsider its sentence, stating that "De La Fuente's use of [First International Bank] as his personal piggy bank was in shocking disregard of sound banking practices and the law to the detriment of depositors, shareholders, and the public. Nevertheless, we remand this matter to the Board for it to consider, in light of this disposition, whether this extraordinary sanction remains deserved."

In November 2015, De La Fuente and the city of San Diego settled a decades-long legal dispute over land-use issues regarding a 312-acre area that De La Fuente is developing in Otay Mesa.

As of 2015, De La Fuente owned businesses and properties in Mexico, the United States, and Uruguay. He sees potential profit to be found in the border wall being erected by the Trump administration, as his properties include 2000 acres along the border, surrounding areas that the government will be using. He intends to set a high price for the land, saying, "I'm in the business of making money."

== Political campaigns ==
=== 2016 presidential ===
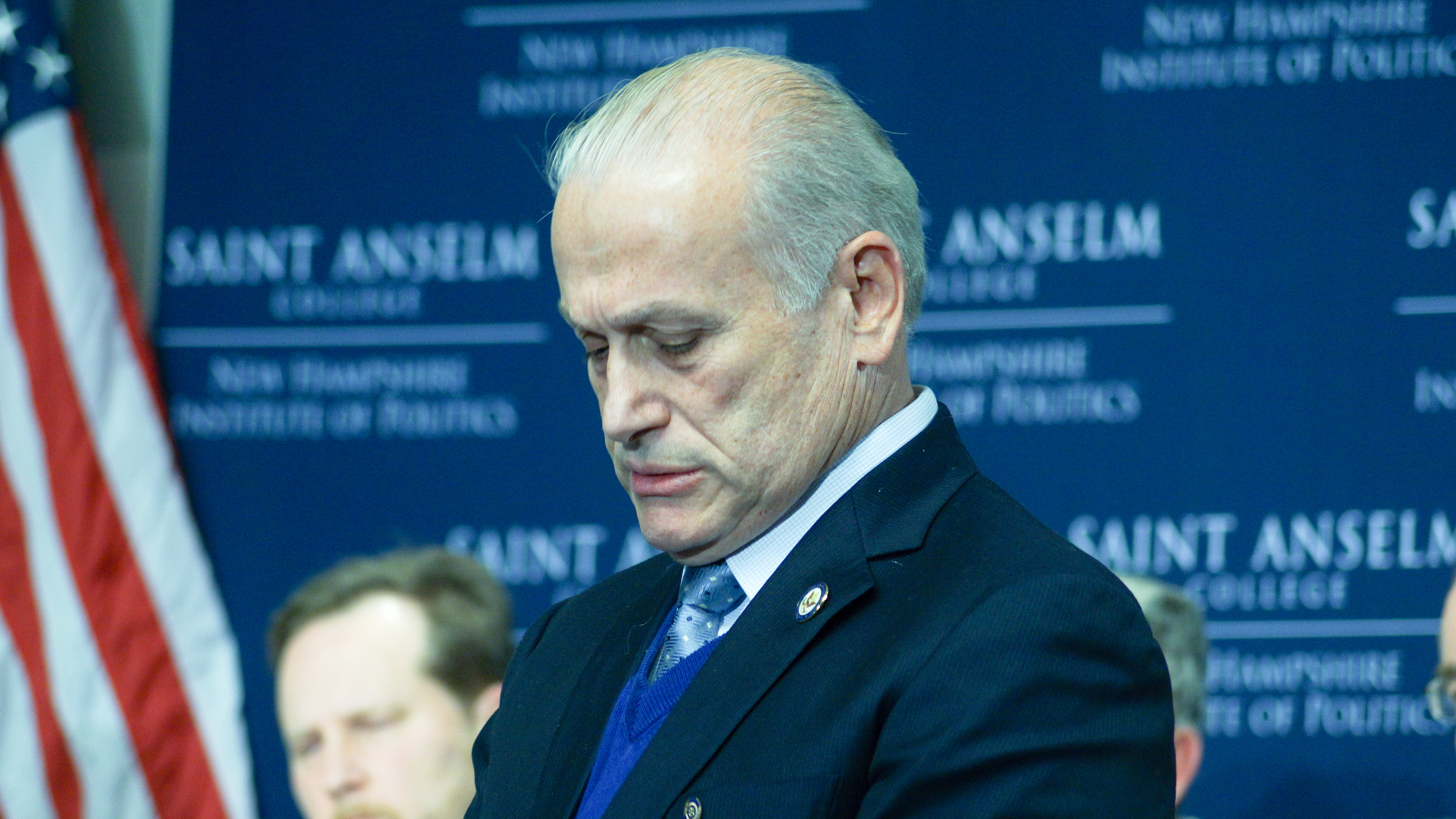
De La Fuente at the Lesser-Known Candidates Forum during his campaign for the Democratic Party presidential nomination, January 2016

De La Fuente campaigned for president in the 2016 United States presidential election. He sought the Democratic Party's nomination during their presidential primaries. His campaign did not win a single primary or a single delegate to the 2016 Democratic National Convention.

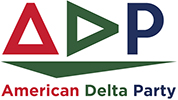
Logo of the American Delta Party

De La Fuente founded the American Delta Party and ran as that party's nominee with his running mate Michael Steinberg. He was also the presidential nominee of the Reform Party, which had ballot access in Florida, Kentucky, Louisiana, Minnesota, and Mississippi. Although De La Fuente's platform was at odds with the Reform Party platform, he was able to get his supporters to vote within its primaries. De La Fuente received 33,136 votes in the general election, 0.02% of the total popular vote. He received no electoral votes. In the popular vote De La Fuente placed eighth overall, behind the Democratic Party's Hillary Clinton, Republican Party's Donald Trump, Libertarian Party's Gary Johnson, Green Party's Jill Stein, independent Evan McMullin, Constitution Party's Darrell Castle, and Party for Socialism and Liberation's Gloria LaRiva.

In 2016, De La Fuente and Stein sued the state of Oklahoma over the state's high requirement for petitions. They dismissed the suit in 2017 after Oklahoma eased their requirements. In February 2018, De La Fuente won two court cases slightly easing ballot access requirements in Virginia and Washington. De La Fuente's history of ballot access suits and his victories received a write-up from the Federal Judicial Center.

=== 2016 senatorial ===
On June 20, 2016, De La Fuente paid the $10,440 (~$13,707 in 2025) qualifying fee to run for the Democratic nomination in the 2016 election for US senator from Florida, over a seat then occupied by Republican Marco Rubio. He competed with Patrick Murphy, Alan Grayson, Pam Keith, and Reginald Luster for the nomination. Murphy won the nomination; De La Fuente came in fourth-place out of five candidates, receiving 60,606 votes (5.38% of the overall vote).

=== 2017 mayoral ===
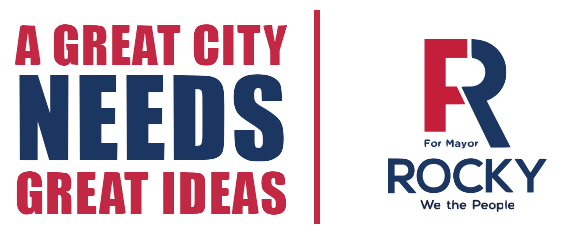
Excerpt from De La Fuente's mayoral campaign material

De La Fuente sought the Republican nomination for Mayor of New York City in the 2017 election. He joined the race claiming that private polling data showed him defeating the two Republican candidates who were then entered, Paul Massey and Michel Faulkner.

De La Fuente's candidacy ran into problems with his lack of residency. City law requires candidates to be residents of the city prior to the election. De La Fuente's campaign said that he had attempted to purchase an apartment, that the building's management refused to interview him because he was Hispanic, and that they might make a federal court case out of this matter.

On March 28, De La Fuente debated mayoral contenders Kevin Coenen, Mike Tolkin, independent Bo Dietl, Democratic challenger Sal Albanese and Republican Faulkner in an event hosted by the Reform Party of New York State (which is not affiliated with the Reform Party of the United States of America).

After Faulkner and Massey suspended their campaigns, only De La Fuente and Nicole Malliotakis remained in the Republican primary. However, two Malliotakis supporters, with the blessing of her campaign, filed objections to De La Fuente's ballot petition signatures. On August 1, the New York City Board of Elections found that De La Fuente did not have sufficient valid signatures to qualify for the ballot, effectively ending De La Fuente's candidacy and leaving Malliotakis unopposed for the nomination.

=== 2018 senatorial ===
De La Fuente ran for U.S. Senate in nine states in 2018, seeking to show problems with the current election process, which he called "Loony Toons!" On February 26, 2018, he filed to run for in California under the Republican Party to unseat incumbent Dianne Feinstein, but failed in the June 5 primary. He came in ninth place out of a field of 35, garnering 135,109 votes for 2% of the total. In a primary system where only the top two make it to the final ballot, this ended his candidacy. On August 8, his candidacy for Senate in Washington state came to an end in the open primary where he was one of the 32 candidates. In Florida, De La Fuente lost the Republican primary to his only challenger, Governor Rick Scott. He also lost primaries in Wyoming, Hawaii, Minnesota, Vermont, Delaware, and Rhode Island.

Some commentators criticized De La Fuente's campaign efforts. The Washington Post noted that in both Hawaii and Vermont, he drew enough votes that he theoretically may have changed the election, as had those same votes had been redirected to the second place candidate instead, that candidate would have won. Jim Camden, a columnist for The Columbian, wrote that "for this year's primaries [...] it's clear the biggest loser was Rocky De La Fuente."

=== 2020 presidential ===
==== Nomination process ====
In January 2017, De La Fuente stated in a court filing that he intended to again seek the Democratic Party nomination in the 2020 presidential election. He reiterated plans to seek the presidency in the wake of his 2018 election failures.

However, De La Fuente ran for the Republican nomination instead. By January 30, 2020, he had raised $17,253 from outside sources and had loaned his own campaign $15.13 million, of which the campaign had returned $8.2 million. For the Republican primaries, he qualified as a candidate in California (where he also qualified for the ballot for the American Independent Party), Connecticut, Delaware, Florida, Idaho, Illinois (where he was on the ballot but did not have delegate candidates to support him), Louisiana, Massachusetts, Mississippi, New Hampshire, Pennsylvania, Texas, and Vermont, and filed in New York, Oklahoma, Rhode Island, and West Virginia. He filed in Tennessee but did not end up on the ballot.

His candidacy survived a ballot access challenge in Alabama, but he withdrew from the state before the ballot was set. He also withdrew from Arkansas, Colorado, and Missouri. His withdrawals from Arkansas and Utah came too late to keep him from appearing on the ballot. He chose to remain in Connecticut's delayed primary, despite pressure from the state's Republican Party chairman. Connecticut's Secretary of the State Denise Merrill then also requested that De La Fuente allow himself to be removed from the ballot, as Trump had already secured enough delegates to win and the voting during the COVID-19 pandemic would put the public's health at risk. De La Fuente remained on the ballot, despite that request and a campaign from the state's Republican Party to have people call the candidate to talk him into dropping out.

He received 0.56% of the 19 million votes cast in Republican primaries and did not earn any delegates.

His failure to make the initial candidate list in Michigan led both to his stating an intention to get on the ballot through submission of petitions and to his campaign manager filing a suit on behalf of a Michigan voter seeking to have De La Fuente on the ballot. He did not end up on the ballot. The Minnesota Supreme Court rejected a similar petition on January 9; in that state, the Republican party chairwoman dictated the candidates who would be printed on the ballot and that a write-in line was to be printed. However, none of the write-in votes for candidates chosen by the party could be counted to advance the election of those candidates. On October 28, 2020, De La Fuente asked the Supreme Court of the United States to review the decision stating the Minnesota Republican Party identified him as eligible to appear in the primary election, that candidates chosen by their party must be treated equally on the ballot, and that Minnesota voters have a right to be presented with a ballot that accurately identifies those candidates. Some states went without Republican primaries for the 2020 cycle, with the Republican leadership in those states having selected incumbent president Donald Trump as their nominee. De La Fuente named Trump, the Trump campaign, the Republican National Committee and various state Republican parties in a suit claiming that there was inappropriate coordination in an attempt to prevent competing candidates for the nomination.

In 2019 De La Fuente filed one of five lawsuits that arose against a California law requiring candidates release their tax returns to appear on the state's primary ballots. That law, which was seen as targeted against the incumbent Donald Trump, was blocked by a federal judge. De La Fuente also requested a U.S. Supreme Court review of a Ninth Circuit court decision which approved California's requirements for ballot access by independent candidates, and mounted a federal challenge to Georgia's granting political parties ultimate control over who appears on their ballots; parties in Florida and Minnesota have similar control. After the lawsuit was filed, Georgia's Republican party submitted a ballot listing only incumbent Donald Trump as a candidate, choosing not to list De La Fuente and three other candidates who had been under consideration.

During the run-up to the primaries, Libertarian Party chairman Nicholas Sarwark suggested that De La Fuente run for his party's nomination, an option which the candidate considered. He did not, however, join the candidate list.

On April 25, De La Fuente became the first presidential nominee of the Alliance Party, with Darcy Richardson as his vice presidential running mate.

On June 20, he received the presidential nomination of the Reform Party, receiving 17 out of the 21 delegate votes cast. Richardson received the vice presidential nomination.

==== General election ====
Total electoral vote eligibility: 229 (Note: The American Independent Party, which nominated De La Fuente in California, did not nominate Richardson for vice-president, instead nominating Kanye West.) On ballot (16 states, 186 electoral votes) Write-in (4 states, 43 electoral votes) Not on ballot

The De La Fuente/Richardson ticket was on the ballot in Florida under the Reform Party; in South Carolina, Tennessee, Mississippi, Maine, Alaska, Colorado, Vermont, Rhode Island, and New Jersey under the Alliance Party; in Michigan under an agreement between the Alliance Party and the Natural Law Party of Michigan; and in Arkansas, Tennessee, and Idaho as an independent. De La Fuente was also on the ballot in California as the American Independent Party candidate, but with Kanye West rather than Richardson as his vice presidential candidate, a decision that was made by the party without De La Fuente (or West, for that matter) being consulted. (Party leaders selected De La Fuente to top the ticket despite him coming in second in the party's primary.)

=== 2020 congressional ===
De La Fuente ran as a Republican in the campaign for the U.S. House of Representatives seat for California's 21st district. (Unlike most other states, California has no law prohibiting simultaneously running for the presidency and for Congress.) His son Ricardo ran for the same seat as a Democrat. Neither De La Fuente lives in the district. Rocky felt that his candidacy would help his son's chances of getting the seat, which was the outcome he desired. Neither De La Fuente succeeded in this primary, coming in third (Ricardo) and fourth (Rocky) in a four-candidate jungle primary in which the top two vote getters compete in the general election.

However, on the same day, Ricardo, who had previously run for the House from California's 34th and Florida's 23rd districts, won the Democratic primary for U.S. representative for Texas's 27th district, but went on to lose the general election.

== Personal life ==
De La Fuente married Katayoun Yazdani.

De La Fuente has five children. He has a stated goal of creating a political dynasty. Two of his sons have also sought office.

His son Ricardo "Ricky" De La Fuente has sought several congressional seats. He first ran as a Democrat in the 2017 California's 34th congressional district special election. He then, in 2018, unsuccessfully sought the Democratic nomination for Florida's 24th US congressional district. In 2020 he unsuccessfully ran as a Democrat in the California's 21st US congressional district (competing against his father, who ran unsuccessfully as a Republican) and successfully won the Democratic nomination for Texas's 27th US congressional district (where he hoped to become a resident). In 2020, Ricardo was also originally running for the Democratic nomination in Florida's 24th US congressional district.

In 2020, his son Roque De La Fuente III entered the Democratic presidential primaries in Arizona, California, Colorado, Idaho, Missouri, New Hampshire, Texas, and Utah.

== Electoral history ==
Year	Office	Type	Party	Votes			Result
Year	Office	Type	Party	Total	%	P.	Result
2016	President	Primary	Democratic	67,468	0.22%	4th	Lost
2016	President	General	Reform	33,136	0.02%	8th	Lost
2016	Senator	Primary	Democratic	60,810	5.4%	4th	Lost
2018	Senator	Primary	Republican	135,278	2.03%	9th	Lost
2018	Senator	Primary	Republican	5,724	0.34%	21st	Lost
2018	Senator	Primary	Republican	3,065	11.42%	5th	Lost
2018	Senator	Primary	Republican	17,051	5.88%	4th	Lost
2018	Senator	Primary	Republican	1,057	4.04%	4th	Lost
2018	Senator	Primary	Republican	1,280	1.16%	5th	Lost
2018	Senator	Primary	Republican	187,209	11.39%	2nd	Lost
2018	Senator	Primary	Republican	1,998	5.28%	3rd	Lost
2018	Senator	Primary	Republican	3,722	12.30%	2nd	Lost
2020	President	Primary	Republican	108,357	0.57%	3rd	Lost
2020	President	General	Alliance	88,234	0.06%	5th	Lost
2020	Rep.	Primary	Republican	1,912	2.4%	4th	Lost

== Notes ==
Party political offices
Preceded by Andre Barnett	Reform nominee for President of the United States; 2016, 2020	Most recent
