= 2016 Mississippi Republican presidential primary =

- March 8, 2016
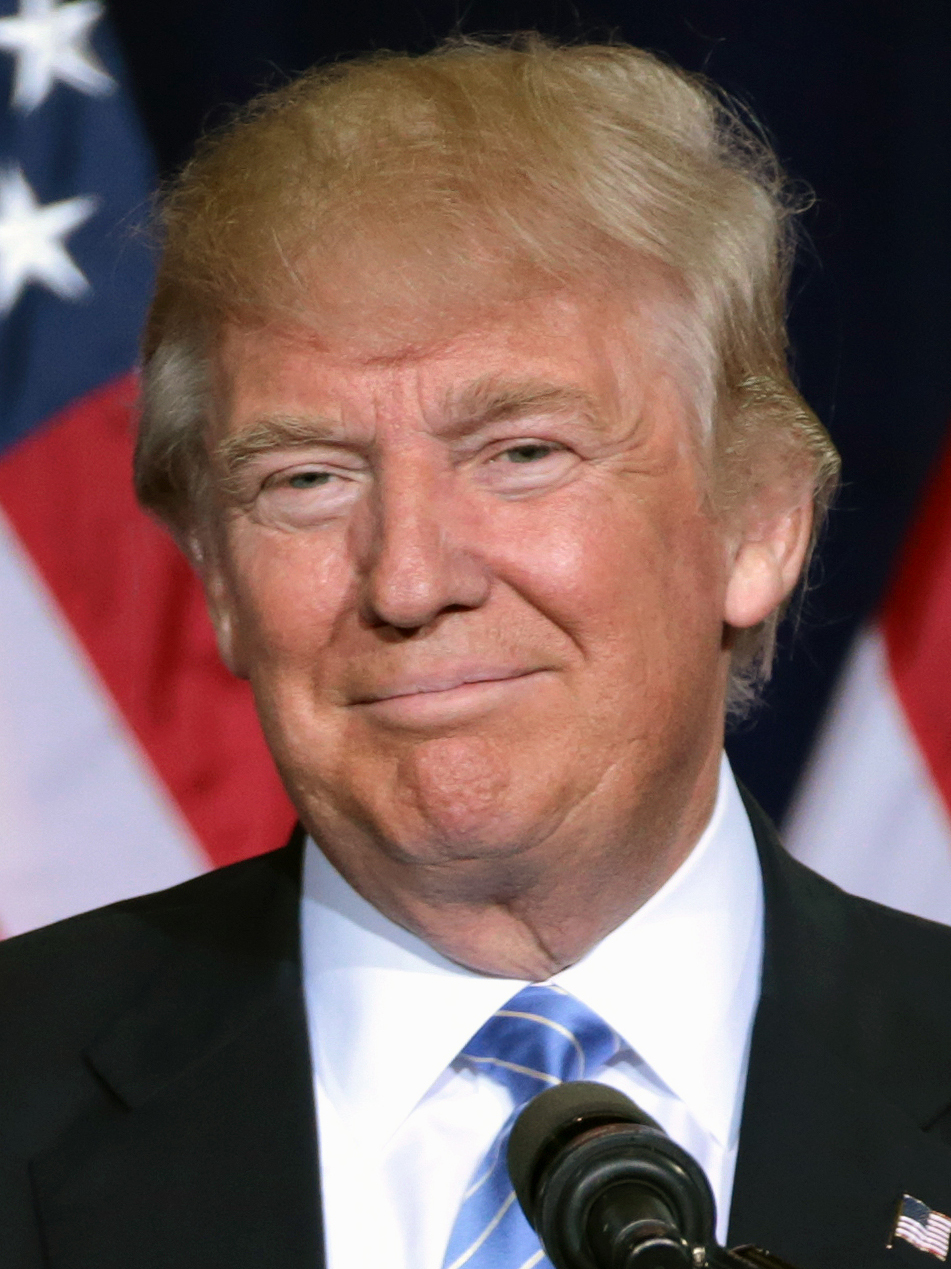

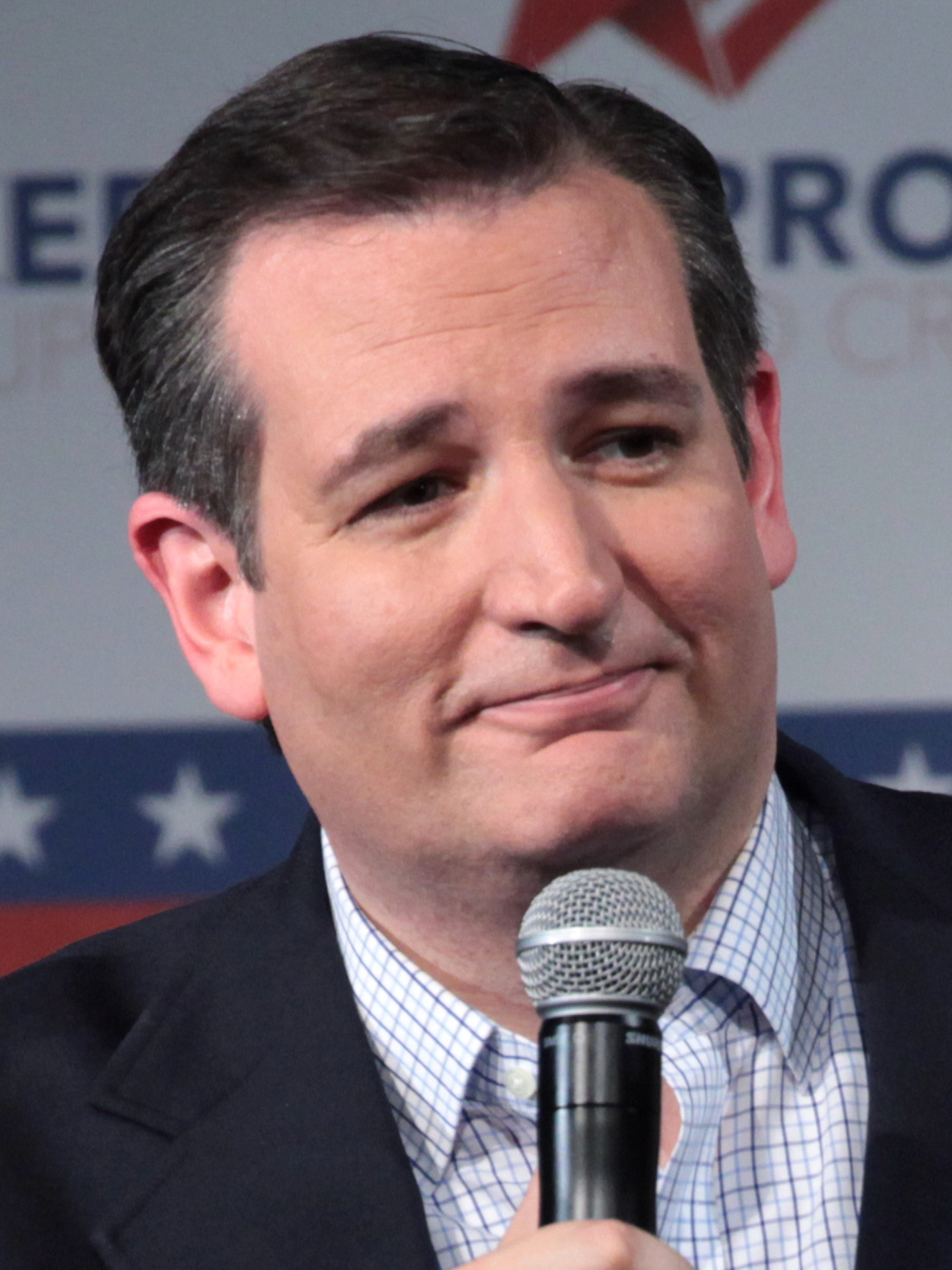

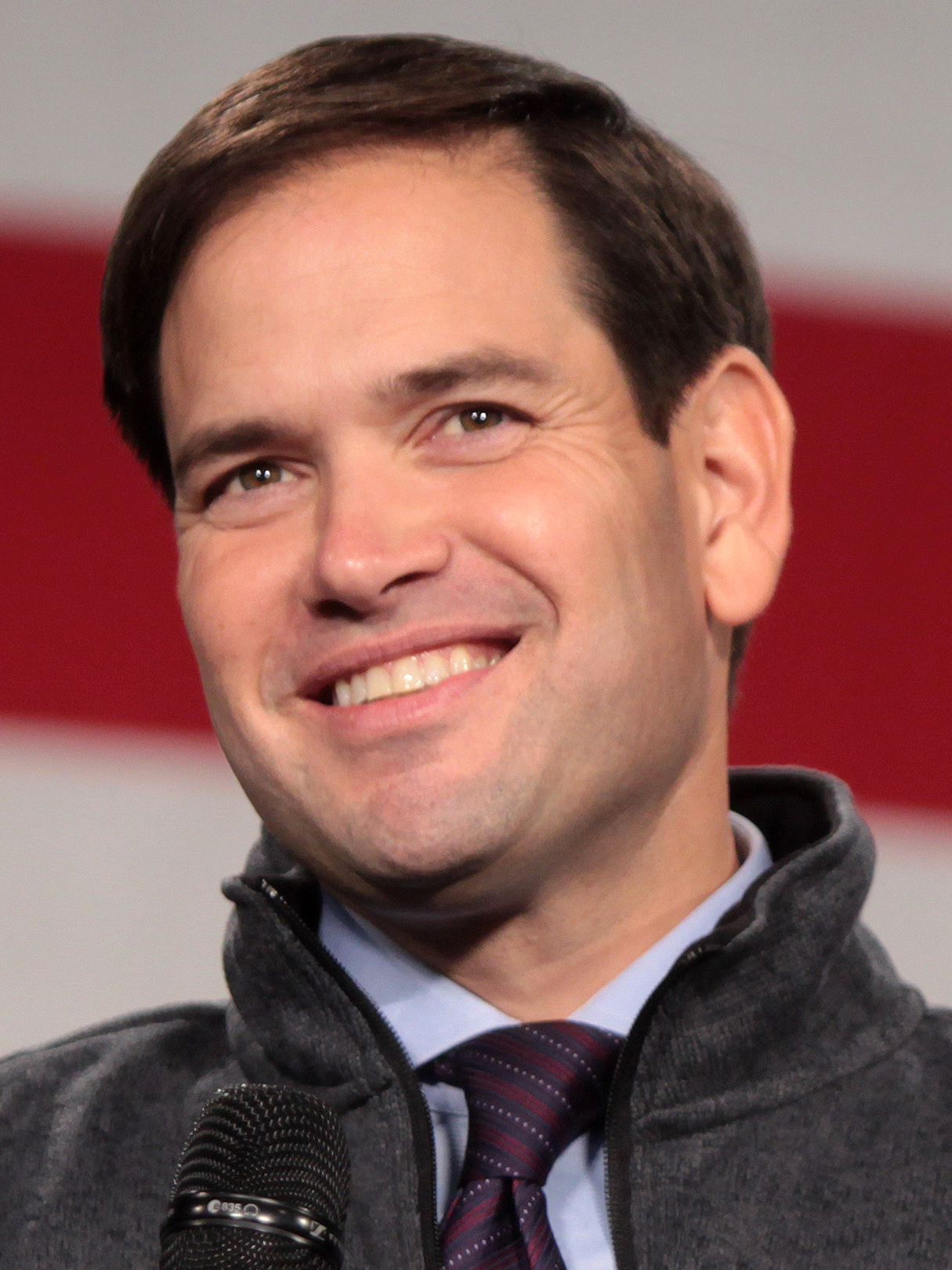

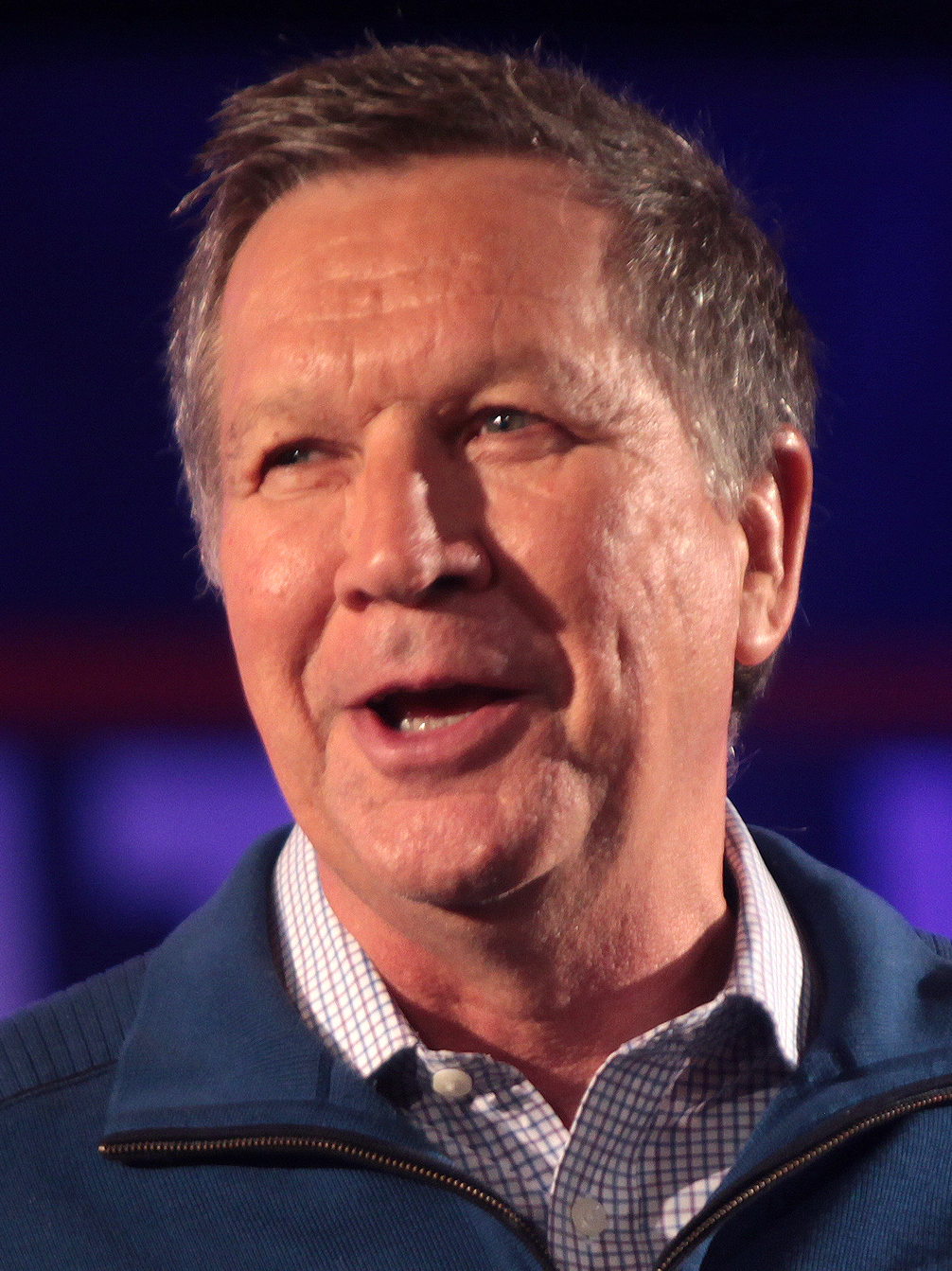
Candidate	Donald Trump	Ted Cruz
Home state	New York	Texas
Delegate count	25	15
Popular vote	196,659	150,364
Percentage	47.24%	36.12%
Candidate	Marco Rubio	John Kasich
Home state	Florida	Ohio
Delegate count	0	0
Popular vote	36,795	21,885
Percentage	8.84%	5.26%
County results
Donald Trump
30–40%
40–50%
50–60%
60–70%
Ted Cruz
30–40%
40–50%

The 2016 Mississippi Republican presidential primary took place in Mississippi on March 8, 2016, ahead of the presidential election that November. The Democrats held their Mississippi primary on the same day.

Mississippi's 40 Republican delegates were contested. Donald Trump won the primary, receiving 47.24% of the vote, while Ted Cruz came in second, with 36.12% of the vote. Trump received 25 of the state's delegates, while Cruz received the remaining 15.

== The state of the campaign ==
Trump had already become the Republican front-runner before the Mississippi primary. He was favored to win Mississippi partly because he had already done well in Southern states' primaries, including Alabama's, which he won with 43.4% of the vote on Super Tuesday.

== Opinion polling ==
A poll of 995 likely Republican Mississippi voters, conducted on February 29, 2016, by Magellan Strategies, gave Trump 41% of the vote, 24% more than second-place Cruz.

== Results ==
Mississippi Republican primary, March 8, 2016
Candidate	Votes	Percentage	Actual delegate count		
Candidate	Votes	Percentage	Bound	Unbound	Total
Donald Trump	196,659	47.24%	25	0	25
Ted Cruz	150,364	36.12%	15	0	15
John Kasich	36,795	8.84%	0	0	0
Marco Rubio	21,885	5.26%	0	0	0
Ben Carson (withdrawn)	5,626	1.35%	0	0	0
Jeb Bush (withdrawn)	1,697	0.41%	0	0	0
Mike Huckabee (withdrawn)	1,067	0.26%	0	0	0
Rand Paul (withdrawn)	643	0.15%	0	0	0
Rick Santorum (withdrawn)	510	0.12%	0	0	0
Chris Christie (withdrawn)	493	0.12%	0	0	0
Carly Fiorina (withdrawn)	224	0.05%	0	0	0
Lindsey Graham (withdrawn)	172	0.04%	0	0	0
George Pataki (withdrawn)	135	0.03%	0	0	0
Unprojected delegates:			0	0	0
Total:	416,270	100.00%	40	0	40
Source: The Green Papers

== Analysis ==
Trump's double-digit victory in Mississippi was seen as solidifying his status as the Republican front-runner, shortly after his disappointing performance in the Louisiana primary. Another unusual aspect of the Mississippi primary results was Marco Rubio's exceptionally poor showing: Rubio came in fourth despite having finished second in several other primaries in the South. Overall, Trump's victory was part of his generally strong performance in the South, where, as a whole, he performed better than either John McCain in 2008 or Mitt Romney in 2012.

Exit polls showed that Trump beat Cruz in virtually every demographic group. They also showed that Trump got an especially large share of the vote among Mississippi voters looking for a candidate who "tells it like it is". Trump also won among white evangelicals, the voters who Cruz had hoped would form his coalition. However, Trump came in second (behind Cruz) among Republican voters who decided whom to vote for in the primary within the previous week.
