= 2016 Louisiana Democratic presidential primary =

- March 5, 2016

Candidate	Hillary Clinton	Bernie Sanders
Home state	New York	Vermont
Delegate count	37	14
Popular vote	221,733	72,276
Percentage	71.12%	23.18%
- Clinton: 40-50% 50-60% 60-70% 70-80% 80-90% Sanders: 40-50% Clinton: 20-30% 30-40% 40-50% 50-60% 60-70% 70-80% 80-90% >90% Sanders: 20-30% 30-40% 40-50% 50–60% 60–70% 70–80% 80–90% >90% Wolfe: 30-40% 50–60% 60–70% >90% O'Malley: 50–60% >90% Wilson: >90% Judd: 30-40% 50-60% Fuente: 20-30% Tie: 20-30% 30-40% 40–50% 50% No votes

The 2016 Louisiana Democratic presidential primary took place on March 5 in the U.S. state of Louisiana as one of the Democratic Party's primaries ahead of the 2016 presidential election.

On the same day, Democratic primaries were held in Kansas and in Nebraska, while the Republican Party held primaries in four states, including their own Louisiana primary.

Clinton won every parish in the state except for Cameron and LaSalle Parishes.

== Opinion polling ==
Poll source	Date	1st	2nd	3rd	Other
Certified Primary results	March 5, 2016	Hillary Clinton; 71.1%	Bernie Sanders; 23.2%		Others; 5.7%
Magellan Strategies Margin of error: ± 3.3% Sample size: 865	March 1, 2016	Hillary Clinton; 61%	Bernie Sanders; 14%		Others / Undecided; 25%
Public Policy Polling Margin of error: ± 4.4; Sample size: 500	February 14–16, 2016	Hillary Clinton; 60%	Bernie Sanders; 29%		
WWL-TV-Clarus Margin of error: ? Sample size: ?	September 20–23, 2015	Hillary Clinton; 57%	Joe Biden; 22%	Bernie; Sanders; 7%	Martin O'Malley 2%, Jim Webb 1%, Lincoln Chafee 0%

== Results ==
Clinton dominated in Louisiana winning all but two of the states parishes. Clinton was declared the winner in Louisiana right when the polls closed.

Louisiana Democratic primary, March 5, 2016
Candidate	Popular vote		Estimated delegates		
Candidate	Count	Percentage	Pledged	Unpledged	Total
Hillary Clinton	221,733	71.12%	37	7	44
Bernie Sanders	72,276	23.18%	14	0	14
Steve Burke	4,785	1.53%			
John Wolfe Jr.	4,512	1.45%			
Martin O'Malley (withdrawn)	2,550	0.82%			
Willie Wilson	1,423	0.46%			
Keith Russell Judd	1,357	0.44%			
Rocky De La Fuente	1,341	0.43%			
Michael Steinberg	993	0.32%			
Henry Hewes	806	0.26%			
Uncommitted	—N/a		0	1	1
Total	311,776	100%	51	8	59

=== Results by parish ===
Parish	Clinton	Votes	Sanders	Votes
Acadia	53.7%	1,862	31.4%	1,087
Allen	55.1%	536	30.6%	297
Ascension	71.1%	4,221	23.3%	1,384
Assumption	71.4%	1,139	19.5%	312
Avoyelles	64.0%	1,181	24.7%	455
Beauregard	53.5%	679	30.8%	391
Bienville	76.9%	1,056	16.2%	222
Bossier	66.5%	2,919	27.0%	1,187
Caddo	79.8%	16,666	16.8%	3,513
Calcasieu	65.7%	6,594	26.2%	2,625
Caldwell	56.4%	250	26.9%	119
Cameron	37.4%	123	40.1%	132
Catahoula	60.6%	431	27.3%	194
Claiborne	76.3%	768	15.7%	158
Concordia	76.7%	1,830	13.8%	329
DeSoto	77.1%	1,508	16.3%	318
East Baton Rouge	78.4%	32,960	19.0%	7,970
East Carroll	88.0%	508	8.1%	47
East Feliciana	77.6%	1,847	14.6%	347
Evangeline	63.1%	1,319	23.8%	498
Franklin	65.5%	650	22.0%	218
Grant	48.6%	367	32.7%	247
Iberia	66.4%	2,171	24.7%	806
Iberville	69.6%	3,699	19.6%	1,042
Jackson	65.9%	827	21.3%	267
Jefferson	67.7%	17,581	27.1%	7,024
Jefferson Davis	56.0%	738	31.7%	418
Lafayette	59.7%	5,920	35.5%	3,523
Lafourche	50.5%	2,512	36.0%	1,789
LaSalle	30.2%	136	40.8%	184
Lincoln	75.3%	1,692	19.4%	436
Livingston	45.4%	1,633	38.7%	1,392
Madison	82.3%	722	11.2%	98
Morehouse	78.8%	1,513	15.5%	298
Natchitoches	68.1%	2,545	22.6%	846
Orleans	74.7%	40,601	24.1%	13,086
Ouachita	78.6%	8,995	15.8%	1,803
Plaquemines	71.6%	674	22.7%	214
Pointe Coupee	76.7%	1,680	16.1%	352
Rapides	71.3%	4,722	21.9%	1,451
Red River	75.3%	530	16.6%	117
Richland	76.1%	696	14.8%	135
Sabine	49.8%	387	33.3%	259
St. Bernard	62.3%	1,057	31.1%	527
St. Charles	69.2%	2,245	24.2%	787
St. Helena	83.8%	1,407	11.1%	186
St. James	82.2%	2,114	12.6%	324
St. John the Baptist	84.8%	3,818	12.5%	564
St. Landry	74.1%	4,606	19.1%	1,184
St. Martin	66.5%	1,869	24.6%	690
St. Mary	72.93%	1,996	19.55%	535
St. Tammany	57.2%	5,996	36.3%	3,800
Tangipahoa	65.7%	4,267	25.5%	1,656
Tensas	82.8%	492	10.3%	61
Terrebonne	66.7%	2,647	25.8%	1,023
Union	68.7%	822	18.1%	217
Vermilion	54.0%	1,002	34.9%	648
Vernon	49.5%	610	35.8%	441
Washington	69.3%	1,663	21.4%	513
Webster	74.8%	1,878	17.4%	436
West Baton Rouge	73.4%	2,178	19.9%	589
West Carroll	49.0%	171	31.5%	110
West Feliciana	80.1%	902	14.7%	166
Winn	63.5%	488	25.1%	193
Total	71.1%	221,615	23.2%	72,240

== Analysis ==
A state Hillary Clinton lost solidly to Barack Obama in 2008, she progressed to victory in 2016. With its heavily African American population, Hillary Clinton solidly defeated Bernie Sanders in Louisiana. The electorate in Louisiana was expected to be about half African American, as it was about 48% African American in 2008. Clinton won overwhelmingly in the major cities of New Orleans, Baton Rouge, Lafayette, and Shreveport, all with significant minority populations. Clinton also did well in the areas north of New Orleans and east of Baton Rouge in the 1st Congressional District, which is among the most conservative in Louisiana and the South at large. She also performed well in rural counties in Central Louisiana and those along the Louisiana-Texas border that are majority white as she had likewise done eight years prior.

== See also ==
- 2016 Louisiana Republican presidential primary
