= 2016 Mississippi Democratic presidential primary =

Presidential primary in 2016

- March 8, 2016

Candidate	Hillary Clinton	Bernie Sanders
Home state	New York	Vermont
Delegate count	31	5
Popular vote	187,334	37,748
Percentage	82.47%	16.62%
- County results Clinton: 60-70% 70-80% 80-90% >90%

The 2016 Mississippi Democratic presidential primary took place on March 8 in the U.S. state of Mississippi as one of the Democratic Party's primaries ahead of the 2016 presidential election.

On the same day, the Democratic Party held a second primary in Michigan, while the Republican Party held primaries in four states, including their own Mississippi primary.

== Opinion polling ==
Poll source	Date	1st	2nd	Other
Official Primary results	March 8, 2016	Hillary Clinton; 82.5%	Bernie Sanders; 16.6%	Others / Uncommitted; 0.9%
Magellan Strategies Margin of error: ±4.5% Sample size: 471	February 29, 2016	Hillary Clinton; 65%	Bernie Sanders; 11%	Others / Undecided; 24%
Public Policy Polling Margin of error: ± 4.3; Sample size: 514	February 14–16, 2016	Hillary Clinton; 60%	Bernie Sanders; 26%	

== Results ==
Mississippi Democratic primary, March 8, 2016
Candidate	Popular vote		Estimated delegates		
Candidate	Count	Percentage	Pledged	Unpledged	Total
Hillary Clinton	187,334	82.47%	31	3	34
Bernie Sanders	37,748	16.62%	5	2	7
Willie Wilson	919	0.40%			
Martin O'Malley (withdrawn)	672	0.30%			
Rocky De La Fuente	481	0.21%			
Write-in	10	0.00%			
Total	227,164	100%	36	5	41

=== Results by county ===
County	Clinton	Votes	Sanders	Votes
Adams	86.7%	3,013	12.6%	438
Alcorn	70.8%	809	26.4%	302
Amite	89.0%	1,212	9.3%	127
Attala	87.7%	1,519	11.3%	195
Benton	85.2%	557	14.2%	93
Bolivar	85.4%	3,029	13.9%	493
Calhoun	84.9%	748	13.6%	120
Carroll	90.0%	828	8.9%	82
Chickasaw	83.1%	1,398	15.6%	263
Choctaw	83.9%	517	15.1%	93
Claiborne	90.3%	1,411	9.0%	141
Clarke	86.3%	1,044	12.5%	151
Clay	86.0%	2,372	12.7%	351
Coahoma	82.3%	2,301	15.8%	442
Copiah	88.2%	3,373	10.7%	411
Covington	88.2%	1,356	10.7%	164
DeSoto	73.3%	5,420	26.3%	1,940
Forrest	73.1%	3,708	26.1%	1,323
Franklin	84.1%	701	14.4%	120
George	72.1%	349	25.2%	122
Greene	84.0%	374	13.7%	61
Grenada	86.0%	1,634	12.9%	245
Hancock	62.0%	893	36.8%	531
Harrison	74.3%	6,886	25.0%	2,313
Hinds	84.1%	31,386	15.3%	5,723
Holmes	92.9%	3,301	6.5%	231
Humphreys	94.2%	2,894	4.4%	134
Issaquena	88.4%	175	10.1%	20
Itawamba	69.2%	377	27.7%	151
Jackson	76.1%	4,811	22.9%	1,448
Jasper	89.6%	1,976	9.2%	203
Jefferson	89.0%	1,550	10.1%	175
Jefferson Davis	89.2%	1,806	9.4%	190
Jones	83.5%	2,681	15.9%	510
Kemper	89.2%	1,008	9.4%	106
Lafayette	64.3%	2,451	35.0%	1,336
Lamar	72.5%	1,464	27.5%	544
Lauderdale	83.5%	3,306	15.6%	619
Lawrence	85.0%	1,112	13.7%	179
Leake	85.4%	1,614	13.8%	260
Lee	76.9%	3,020	22.5%	884
LeFlore	90.4%	2,094	9.5%	219
Lincoln	85.1%	1,817	14.5%	309
Lowndes	82.4%	4,030	17.3%	846
Madison	83.4%	7,414	16.1%	1,434
Marion	87.5%	1,539	11.5%	202
Marshall	88.7%	3,361	10.2%	386
Monroe	84.9%	1,913	13.8%	311
Montgomery	89.0%	953	10.2%	109
Neshoba	78.1%	929	20.9%	248
Newton	83.5%	1,000	15.2%	182
Noxubee	90.5%	1,397	8.7%	134
Oktibbeha	75.8%	2,389	23.5%	739
Panola	85.8%	3,061	13.4%	479
Pearl River	72.4%	974	26.2%	352
Perry	82.7%	401	15.9%	77
Pike	86.5%	2,870	12.8%	425
Pontotoc	71.2%	733	26.3%	271
Prentiss	71.0%	681	26.2%	251
Quitman	85.3%	986	12.3%	142
Rankin	77.1%	4,689	22.3%	1,356
Scott	85.5%	2,013	13.1%	309
Sharkey	91.4%	645	8.1%	57
Simpson	85.3%	1,855	13.5%	294
Smith	81.4%	712	16.8%	147
Stone	77.5%	544	20.5%	144
Sunflower	87.8%	2,332	11.3%	299
Tallahatchie	87.4%	1,341	10.8%	166
Tate	85.1%	1,435	14.4%	242
Tippah	74.9%	575	22.4%	172
Tishomingo	61.3%	361	33.4%	197
Tunica	77.4%	904	18.8%	220
Union	71.3%	593	26.8%	223
Walthall	88.5%	1,111	10.5%	132
Warren	84.4%	3,463	14.9%	612
Washington	87.7%	2,982	12.0%	409
Wayne	83.8%	1,441	14.6%	251
Webster	81.9%	397	16.3%	79
Wilkinson	93.4%	1,269	5.1%	69
Winston	86.3%	1,442	12.1%	202
Yalobusha	84.2%	1,214	14.9%	215
Yazoo	90.8%	2,203	8.4%	203
Total	82.5%	187,334	16.6%	37,748

== Analysis ==
After losing badly in Mississippi to Barack Obama eight years earlier, Hillary Clinton managed a 66-point routing against Bernie Sanders in the state in 2016. She carried all counties and won across all demographics, income levels and educational attainment levels. The key to Clinton's success, however, was an 89-11 showing among African American voters, who made up 71% of the Democratic electorate in the state.

Mississippi gave Clinton her largest win in any state during the 2016 primaries.
