= 2016 Alabama Republican presidential primary =

- March 1, 2016

50 pledged delegates to the 2016 Republican National Convention
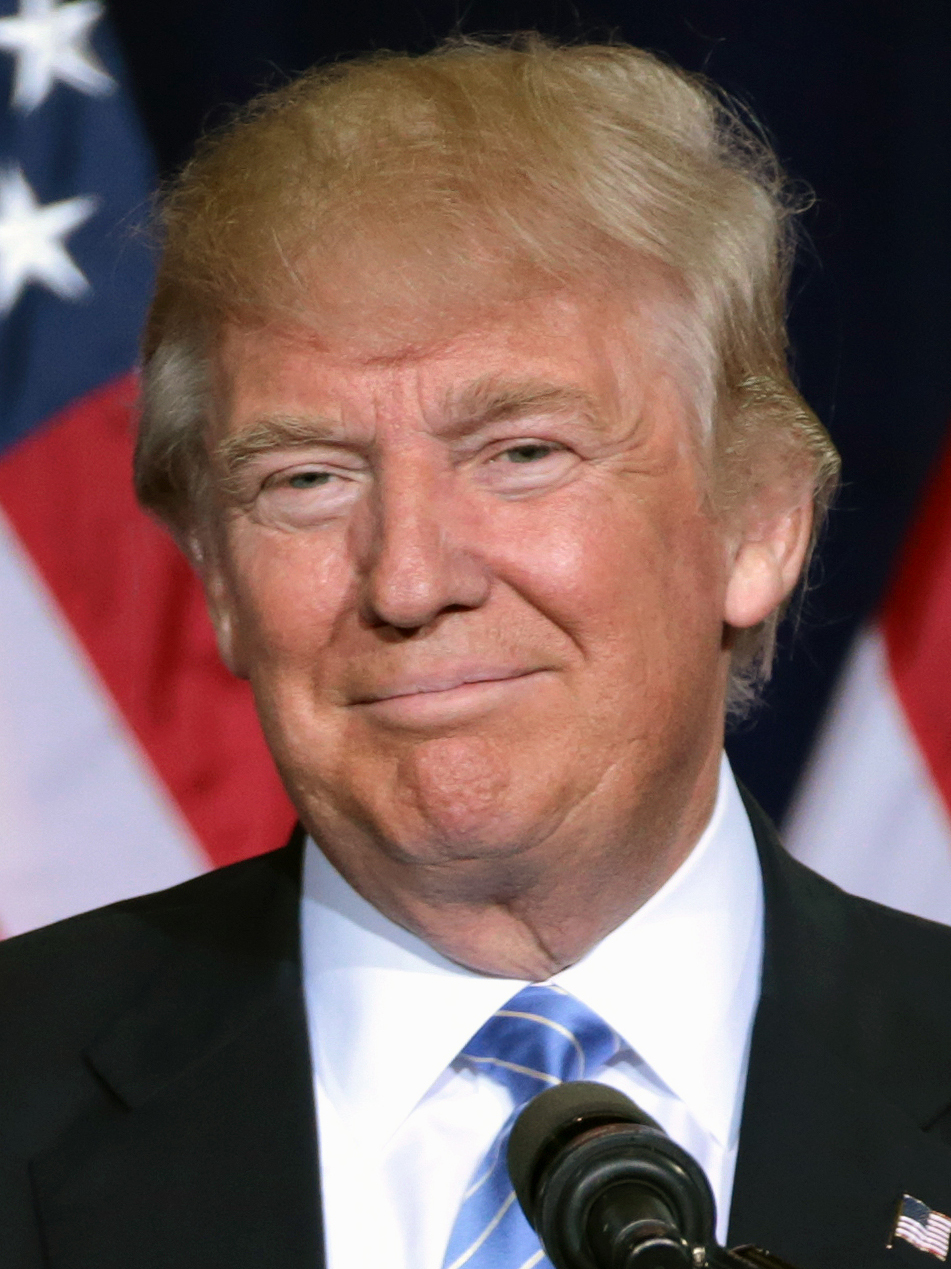

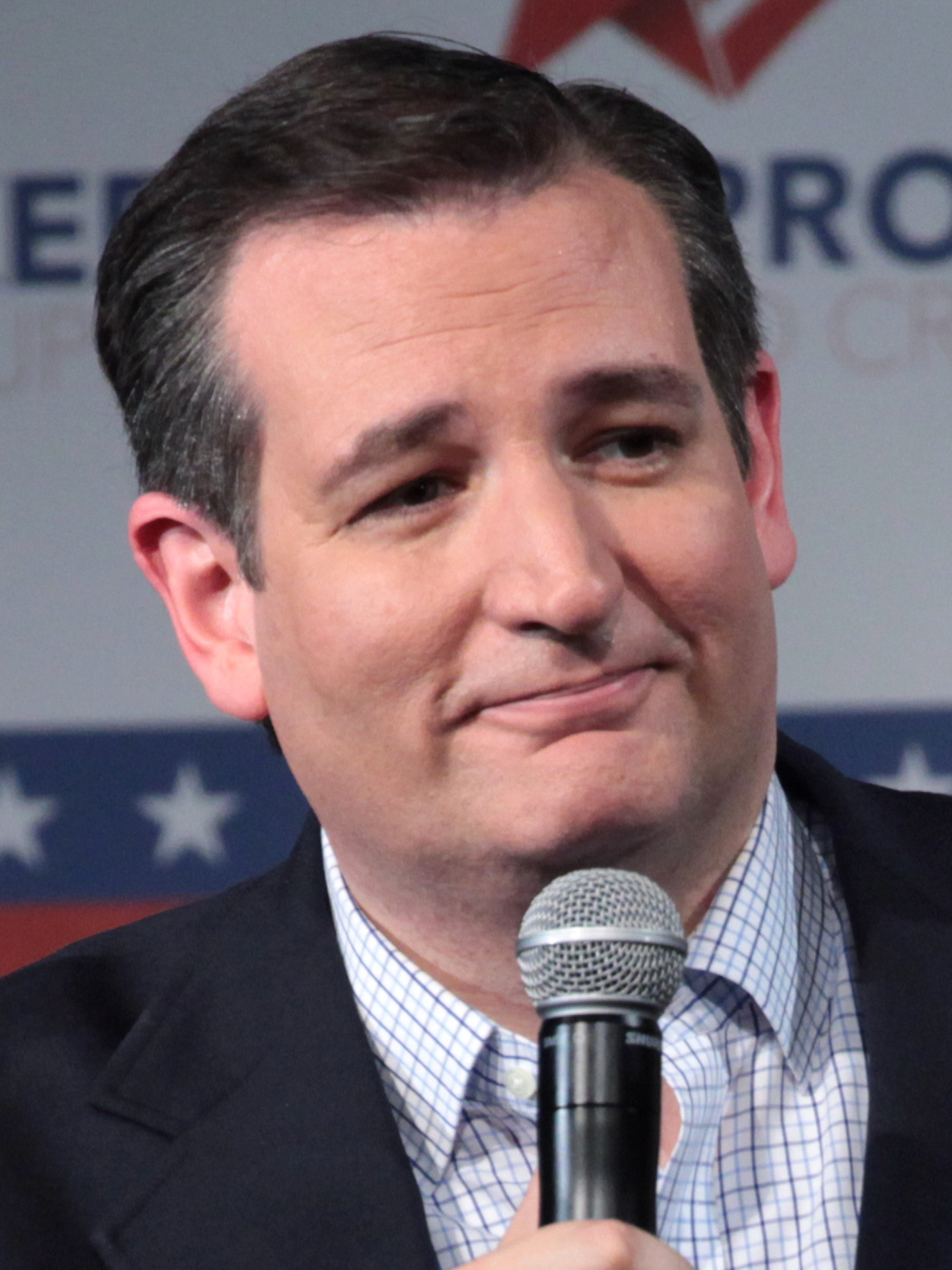

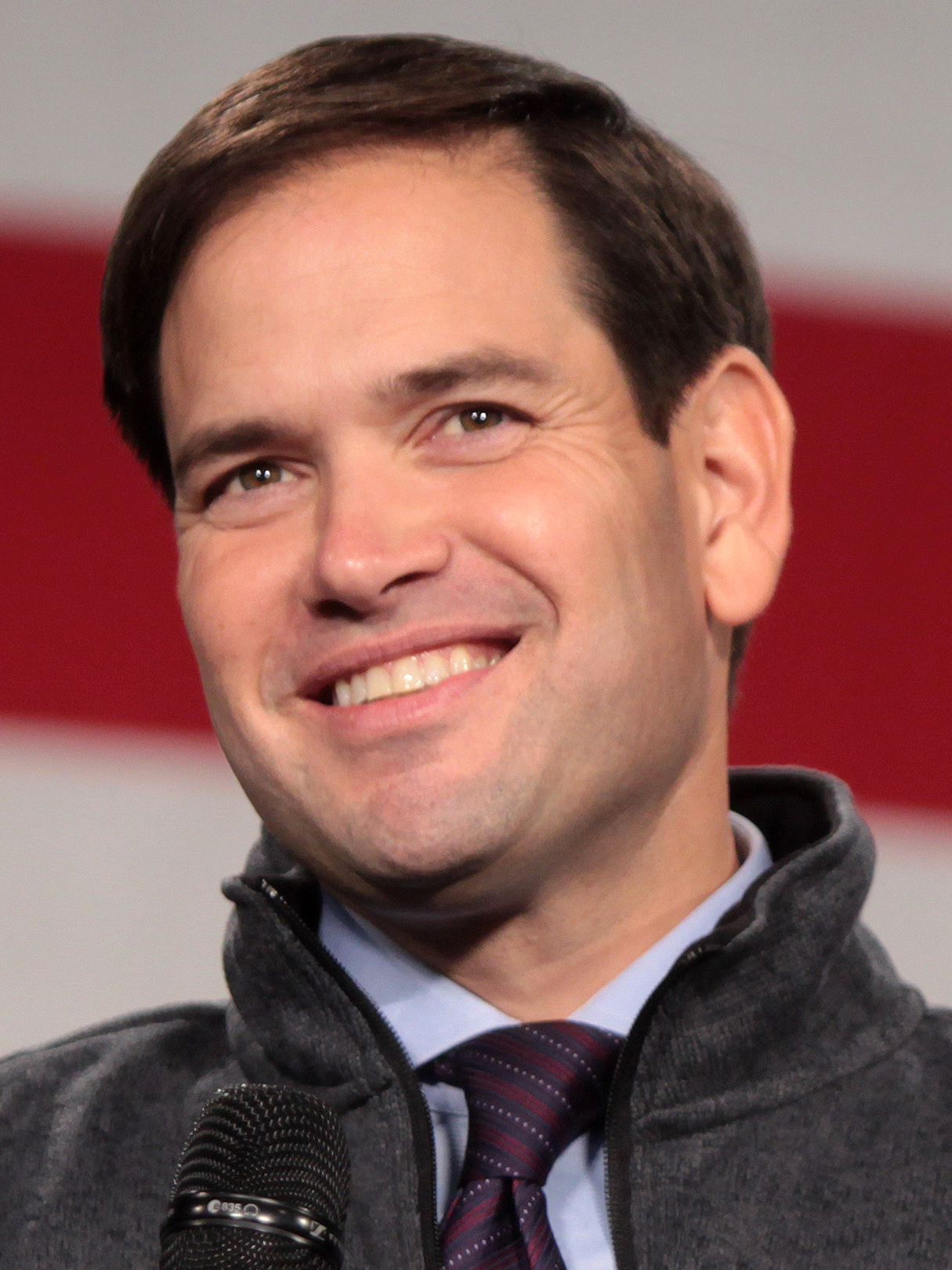

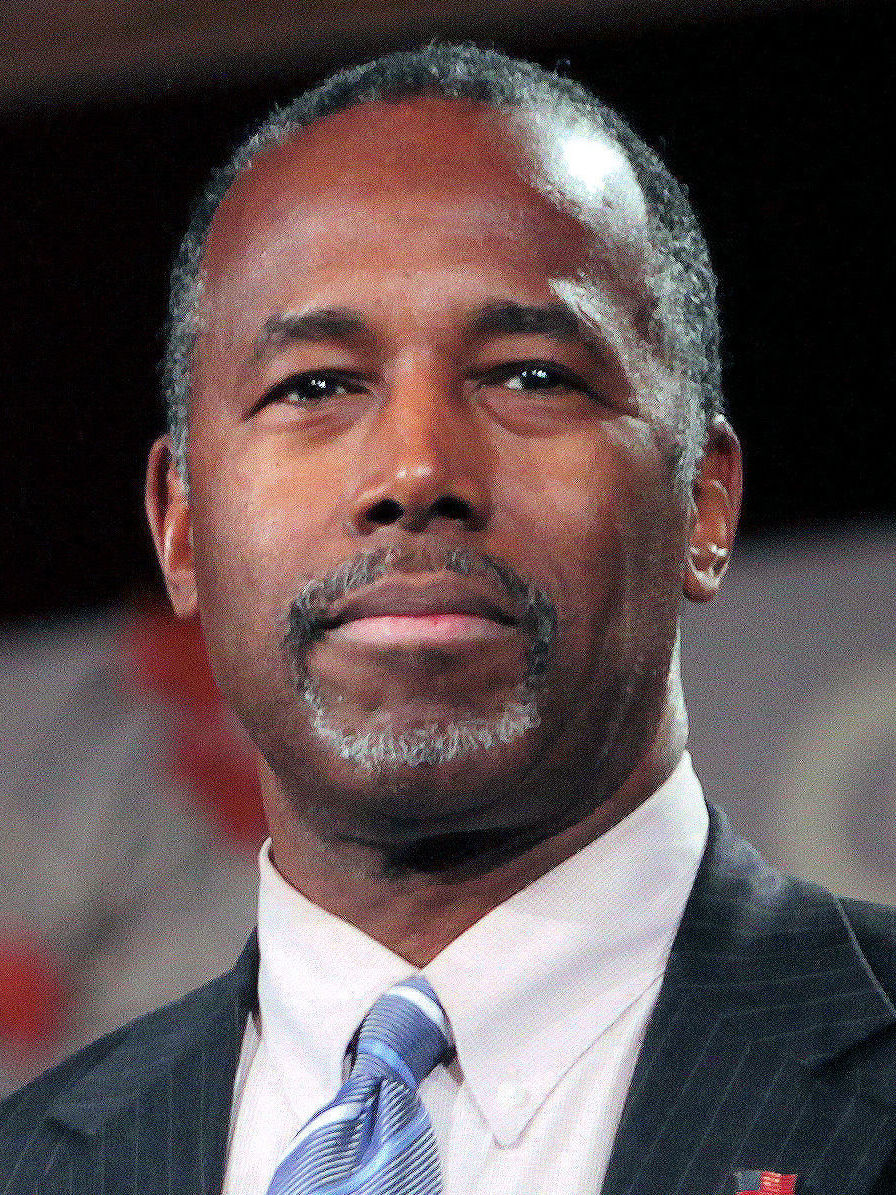
Candidate	Donald Trump	Ted Cruz
Home state	New York	Texas
Delegate count	36	13
Popular vote	373,721	181,479
Percentage	43.42%	21.09%
Candidate	Marco Rubio	Ben Carson
Home state	Florida	Virginia
Delegate count	1	0
Popular vote	160,606	88,094
Percentage	18.66%	10.24%
- Donald Trump 30–40% 40–50% 50–60%

The 2016 Alabama Republican presidential primary took place on March 1, 2016. This was the fifth primary held in the 2016 Republican primary. Donald Trump won the primary handily. The election was also held on Super Tuesday. Trump eventually won the Republican primary. He was elected President of the United States on November 8, 2016, against Hillary Clinton.

Ahead of the primary, Alabama was considered one of Donald Trump's strongest states. Trump enjoyed the endorsement of Senator Jeff Sessions, who would later join his Department of Justice as Attorney General. Sessions was Trump's first endorsement in the U.S. Senate.

== Candidates ==
- Donald Trump
- Ted Cruz
- Marco Rubio
- John Kasich
- Ben Carson

== Endorsements ==
Donald Trump

U.S. Senators

- Jeff Sessions, U.S. Senator

== Polling ==
=== Aggregate polls ===
Source of poll aggregation	Dates administered	Dates updated	Marco Rubio Republican	Donald Trump Republican	Ted Cruz Republican	Margin
RealClearPolitics	until March 1, 2016	March 1, 2016	20.3%	38.0%	14.7%	Trump +17.7
FiveThirtyEight	until March 1, 2016	March 1, 2016	20.4%	43.4%	17.2%	Trump +23.0

Poll source	Date	1st	2nd	3rd	Other
Primary results	March 1, 2016	Donald Trump43.42%	Ted Cruz21.09%	Marco Rubio18.66%	Ben Carson 10.24%, John Kasich 4.43%, Jeb Bush 0.46%, Mike Huckabee 0.30%, Rand Paul 0.22%, Chris Christie 0.10%, Rick Santorum 0.07%, Carly Fiorina 0.06%, Lindsey Graham 0.03%
SurveyMonkey Margin of error: ± ?% Sample size: 741	February 22–29, 2016	Donald Trump; 47%	Ted Cruz 18%	Marco Rubio 14%	Ben Carson 9%, John Kasich 3%, Undecided 9%
Monmouth University Margin of error: ± 4.6% Sample size: 450	February 25–28, 2016	Donald Trump; 42%	Marco Rubio 19%	Ted Cruz 16%	Ben Carson 11%, John Kasich 5%, Undecided 7%
Opinion Savvy Margin of error: ± 4.6% Sample size: 460	February 25–26, 2016	Donald Trump; 35.8%	Marco Rubio 23.0%	Ted Cruz 16.2%	Ben Carson 10.5%, John Kasich 7.5%, Undecided 7.0%
AL.com Margin of error: ± 4.5% Sample size: 500	December 10–13, 2015	Donald Trump; 35%	Ted Cruz 15%	Marco Rubio 12%	Ben Carson 12%, Jeb Bush 4%, Mike Huckabee 4%, Chris Christie 3%, John Kasich 2%, Carly Fiorina 1%, Rand Paul <1%, Rick Santorum <1%, Lindsey Graham <1%
Gravis Marketing Margin of error: ± 2% Sample size: 1616	September 3, 2015	Donald Trump; 38%	Ben Carson 16.7%	Jeb Bush 4.9%	Ted Cruz 4.1%, Mike Huckabee 2.7%, Marco Rubio 2.3%, Carly Fiorina 2.3%, Rand Paul 1.5%, John Kasich 1.3%, Scott Walker 1.1%, Chris Christie 0.9%, Rick Santorum 0.4%, Rick Perry 0.3%, Bobby Jindal 0.3%, Lindsey Graham 0.1%, unsure 23.2%
News-5/Strategy Research Margin of error: ± 2% Sample size: 3500	August 11, 2015	Donald Trump; 30%	Jeb Bush 15%	Ben Carson 11%	Marco Rubio 11%, Mike Huckabee 8%, Carly Fiorina 8%, Ted Cruz 7.5%, Scott Walker 3%, Other 5%
Opinion Savvy/Insider Advantage Margin of error: ± 4.4% Sample size: 481	August 2–3, 2015	Donald Trump; 37.6%	Ben Carson 14.6%	Jeb Bush 11.8%	Mike Huckabee 7.9%, Ted Cruz 4.5%, Scott Walker 3.8%, Chris Christie 3.2%, Marco Rubio 2.6%, Rand Paul 2.2%, Bobby Jindal 2.0%, John Kasich 1.4%, Rick Santorum 1.2%, Rick Perry 1.0%, Lindsey Graham 0.7%, Carly Fiorina 0.5%, George Pataki 0.0%, Someone else 1.9%, Undecided 3.1%
Cygnal Margin of error: ± 3.42% Sample size: 821	July 7–8, 2014	Jeb Bush; 19.8%	Ben Carson 12.6%	Rand Paul 10.5%	Chris Christie 8.8%, Rick Perry 7.2%, Ted Cruz 5.6%, Rick Santorum 5.3%, Bobby Jindal 3.9%, Scott Walker 3.6%, Undecided 22.6%

== Results ==
Alabama Republican primary, March 1, 2016
Candidate	Votes	Percentage	Actual delegate count		
Candidate	Votes	Percentage	Bound	Unbound	Total
Donald Trump	373,721	43.42%	36	0	36
Ted Cruz	181,479	21.09%	13	0	13
Marco Rubio	160,606	18.66%	1	0	1
Ben Carson	88,094	10.24%	0	0	0
John Kasich	38,119	4.43%	0	0	0
Uncommitted	7,953	0.92%	0	0	0
Jeb Bush (withdrawn)	3,974	0.46%	0	0	0
Mike Huckabee (withdrawn)	2,539	0.30%	0	0	0
Rand Paul (withdrawn)	1,895	0.22%	0	0	0
Chris Christie (withdrawn)	858	0.10%	0	0	0
Rick Santorum (withdrawn)	617	0.07%	0	0	0
Carly Fiorina (withdrawn)	544	0.06%	0	0	0
Lindsey Graham (withdrawn)	253	0.03%	0	0	0
Unprojected delegates:			0	0	0
Total:	860,652	100.00%	50	0	50
Source: The Green Papers

=== Results by county ===
County	Trump	Cruz	Rubio	Carson	Kasich	Uncommitted	Bush	Huckabee	Other
Autauga	44.57%	20.48%	14.75%	14.57%	3.48%	1.01%	0.47%	0.26%	0.40%
Baldwin	46.87%	17.02%	19.26%	8.39%	5.93%	1.38%	0.45%	N/A	0.70%
Barbour	50.16%	17.77%	14.62%	12.26%	3.6%	0.61%	0.3%	0.26%	0.41%
Bibb	49.46%	25.45%	11.18%	9.89%	2.11%	0.76%	0.43%	0.38%	0.35%
Blount	48.75%	24.39%	12.15%	10.05%	2.22%	1.12%	0.37%	0.51%	0.42%
Bullock	56.50%	16.97%	11.55%	8.48%	4.15%	0.54%	1.26%	0.18%	0.36%
Butler	53.78%	16.68%	13.37%	11.77%	2.69%	0.53%	0.66%	N/A	0.53%
Calhoun	45.06%	19.43%	16.32%	11.83%	4.78%	1.04%	0.64%	0.36%	0.53%
Chambers	47.52%	20.11%	13.04%	13.07%	3.68%	0.96%	0.79%	0.26%	0.57%
Cherokee	52.10%	17.23%	15.19%	10.01%	2.83%	1.29%	0.37%	0.54%	0.43%
Chilton	49.43%	21.78%	13.44%	10.75%	2.04%	1.10%	0.59%	0.48%	0.38%
Choctaw	49.93%	21.05%	14.70%	7.89%	3.17%	1.26%	0.93%	0.51%	0.56%
Clarke	50.22%	19.28%	17.48%	8.92%	2.71%	0.41%	0.33%	0.39%	0.26%
Clay	47.48%	20.89%	12.49%	12.25%	3.09%	1.60%	1.06%	0.52%	0.62%
Cleburne	48.30%	21.13%	13.62%	9.95%	2.41%	1.64%	1.55%	0.57%	0.82%
Coffee	41.40%	23.37%	15.52%	13.16%	3.4%	1.32%	0.66%	0.38%	0.64%
Colbert	47.45%	19.62%	17.68%	10.89%	3.05%	0.54%	N/A	N/A	0.77%
Conecuh	59.02%	15.96%	10.82%	10.51%	1.30%	0.84%	0.61%	0.46%	0.46%
Coosa	55.32%	19.56%	10.81%	9.02%	2.96%	0.99%	0.45%	0.27%	0.63%
Covington	48.14%	18.51%	13.33%	13.33%	3.37%	1.56%	0.81%	0.43%	0.51%
Crenshaw	54.50%	21.93%	9.11%	10.42%	2.55%	0.51%	0.44%	N/A	0.55%
Cullman	50.65%	20.25%	13.49%	10.96%	2.66%	0.80	0.37%	0.31%	0.51%
Dale	45.28%	21.90%	13.02%	12.54%	3.63%	1.76%	0.61%	0.61%	0.66%
Dallas	59.70%	20.66%	8.68%	5.25%	2.63%	1.48%	0.91%	0.57%	0.11%
DeKalb	47.59%	16.39%	21.60%	9.79%	2.47%	1.01%	0.39%	0.39%	0.37%
Elmore	47.49%	18.35%	13.43%	14.90%	3.58%	0.91%	0.54%	0.29%	0.51%
Escambia	49.33%	18.00%	17.14%	10.24%	3.40%	0.56%	0.49%	0.37%	0.47%
Etowah	46.09%	20.75%	16.79%	11.19%	3.27%	0.74%	0.41%	0.28%	0.49%
Fayette	49.86%	20.97%	13.35%	9.81%	2.49%	1.77%	0.50%	0.88%	0.36%
Franklin	51.47%	21.29%	13.42%	9.26%	2.55%	0.72%	0.33%	0.48%	0.48%
Geneva	48.62%	23.73%	12.99%	9.26%	2.30%	1.31%	0.66%	0.55%	0.59%
Greene	53.85%	21.61%	12.09%	6.96%	3.66%	N/A	0.73%	0.37%	0.74%
Hale	52.07%	24.98%	11.74%	7.77%	2.12%	0.53%	N/A	0.26%	0.53%
Henry	46.79%	22.28%	14.36%	11.47%	2.81%	1.05%	0.55%	0.29%	0.39%
Houston	40.39%	22.56%	18.19%	11.43%	4.13%	1.66%	0.68%	0.44%	0.53%
Jackson	49.89%	16.37%	16.90%	10.82%	2.83%	2.00%	0.37%	0.44%	0.40%
Jefferson	35.02%	23.82%	24.67%	8.92%	6.09%	0.55%	0.36%	N/A	0.58%
Lamar	50.43%	19.26%	12.97%	9.57%	2.87%	2.25%	0.78%	1.03%	0.83%
Lauderdale	42.14%	18.36%	18.69%	12.05%	5.52%	1.66%	0.36%	0.53%	0.69%
Lawrence	52.89%	17.53%	13.53%	10.74%	2.87%	0.93%	0.55%	0.41%	0.55%
Lee	32.96%	23.17%	22.50%	11.72%	7.11%	0.98%	0.61%	0.35%	0.59%
Limestone	43.03%	21.39%	18.85%	10.87%	3.90%	0.89%	0.37%	N/A	0.70%
Lowndes	59.52%	16.31%	9.88%	10.48%	3.10%	0.36%	N/A	N/A	0.36%
Macon	47.91%	19.78%	12.38%	12.79%	5.25%	0.67%	0.54%	0.54%	0.13%
Madison	36.18%	20.69%	26.03%	9.58%	5.94%	0.59%	0.31%	N/A	0.69%
Marengo	53.95%	21.17%	11.79%	7.89%	2.41%	1.21%	0.93%	0.28%	0.37%
Marion	52.92%	19.15%	13.91%	8.89%	2.52%	0.77%	0.56%	0.60%	0.68%
Marshall	49.51%	15.12%	20.56%	9.86%	3.23%	0.69%	0.30%	0.29%	0.44%
Mobile	45.22%	21.41%	18.93%	7.71%	4.59%	0.93%	0.49%	N/A	0.73%
Monroe	52.06%	17.42%	15.78%	9.87%	2.86%	0.50%	0.53%	0.53%	0.45%
Montgomery	39.42%	17.59%	20.85%	12.65%	7.30%	0.83%	0.64%	N/A	0.73%
Morgan	44.59%	19.73%	18.31%	11.40%	4.53%	0.50%	0.25%	0.27%	0.42%
Perry	51.73%	32.80%	8.80%	4.00%	0.53%	1.33%	0.53%	0.27%	N/A
Pickens	44.05%	25.74%	13.81%	11.31%	2.54%	0.63%	0.70%	0.98%	0.23%
Pike	46.02%	20.15%	14.79%	12.81%	3.16%	1.23%	0.79%	0.40%	0.66%
Randolph	51.59%	20.65%	12.83%	9.36%	2.92%	0.94%	0.77%	0.55%	0.39%
Russell	47.45%	27.03%	12.31%	7.92%	2.82%	1.04%	0.53%	N/A	0.90%
St. Clair	44.60%	26.88%	13.42%	10.86%	2.69%	0.53%	0.41%	N/A	0.61%
Shelby	34.35%	26.37%	22.95%	9.42%	5.03%	0.83%	0.37%	N/A	0.67%
Sumter	59.36%	15.90%	13.78%	7.42%	1.41%	0.35%	1.41%	0.35%	N/A
Talladega	51.05%	19.98%	13.56%	9.54%	3.80%	0.71%	0.59%	0.35%	0.40%
Tallapoosa	52.78%	15.01%	14.60%	11.40%	4.20%	0.53%	0.62%	0.27%	0.58%
Tuscaloosa	37.46%	25.05%	20.37%	10.64%	4.44%	0.88%	0.41%	0.29%	0.44%
Walker	55.11%	20.37%	10.84%	8.97%	2.37%	1.17%	0.46%	0.32%	0.40%
Washington	53.78%	21.82%	15.31%	6.43%	1.14%	0.85%	N/A	N/A	0.68%
Wilcox	54.36%	21.59%	12.12%	8.33%	2.27%	N/A	0.57%	0.38%	0.38%
Winston	56.12%	18.01%	11.85%	9.02%	2.73%	0.90%	0.45%	0.37%	0.54%
TOTAL	43.42%	21.09%	18.66%	10.24%	4.43%	0.92%	0.46%	0.30%	0.48%

=== By congressional district ===
Trump won all 7 congressional districts.

District	Trump	Cruz	Rubio
1st	46%	19%	19%
2nd	46%	21%	15%
3rd	44%	21%	16%
4th	49%	19%	16%
5th	40%	20%	22%
6th	37%	25%	22%
7th	43%	23%	18%

== Analysis ==
According to Pew Research, Alabama's Republican electorate has the second-highest proportion of white Evangelicals of any Super Tuesday state, at 63% of Republican voters.

Donald Trump won the Alabama primary in a landslide due to support from Evangelical primary voters. Trump carried 43% of Evangelicals compared to 22% for Ted Cruz, according to exit polls by Edison Research. Many pundits were perplexed by Trump's dominance among culturally conservative Southern whites who were expected to view him as immoral, but he benefitted from voters' racial, cultural, and economic angst that mattered more than shared values.
