= 2016 Louisiana Republican presidential primary =

- March 5, 2016
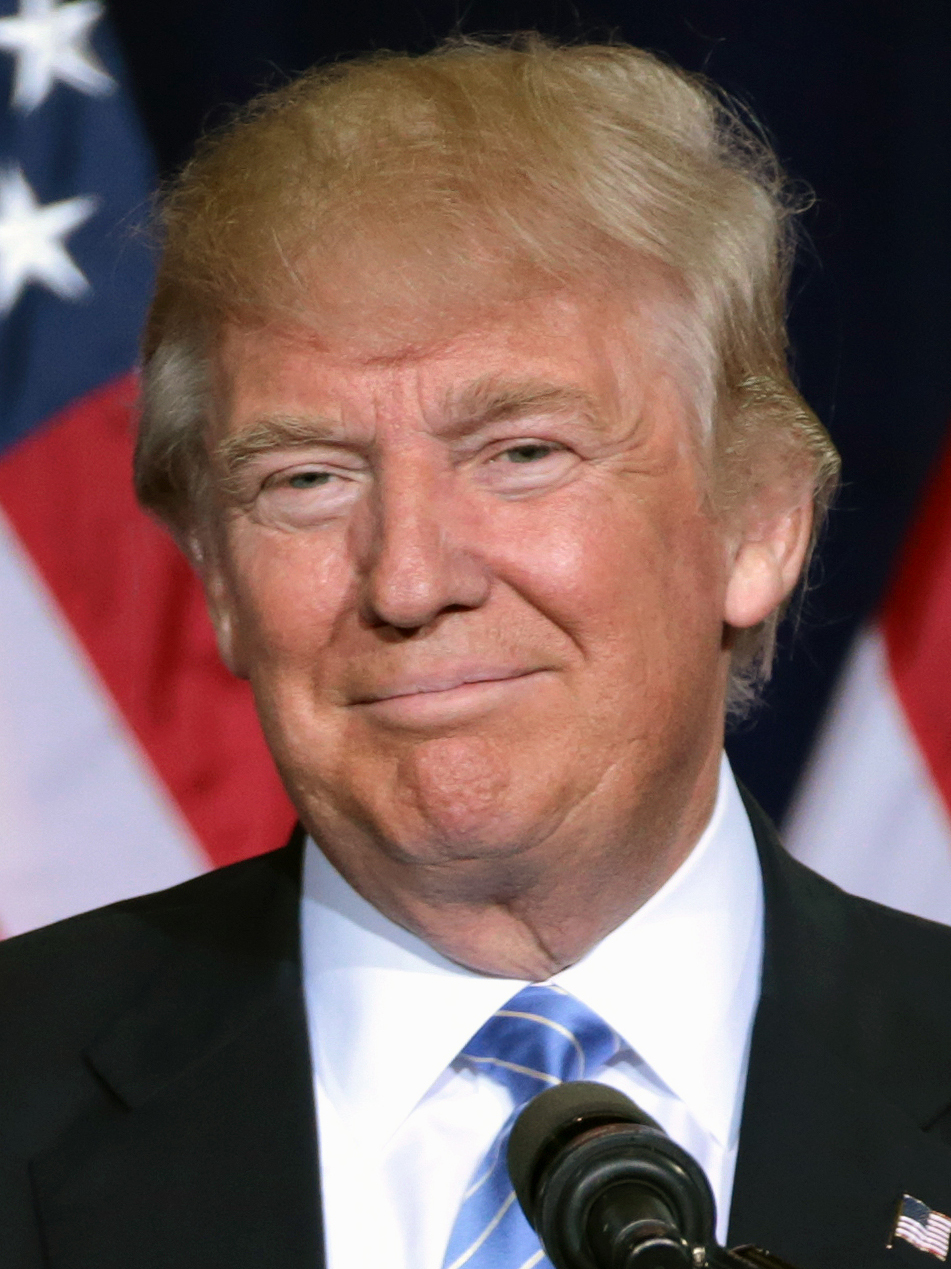

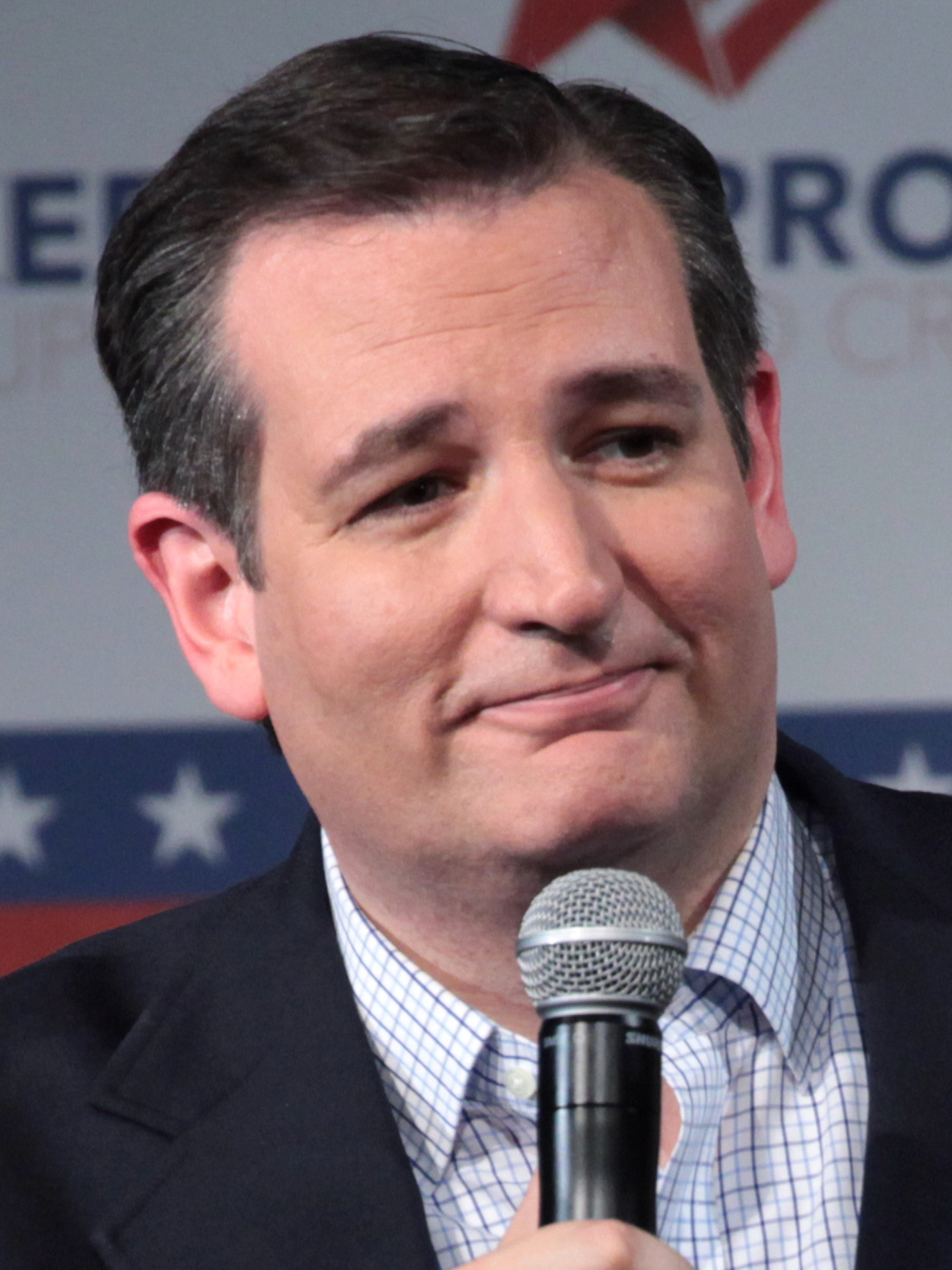

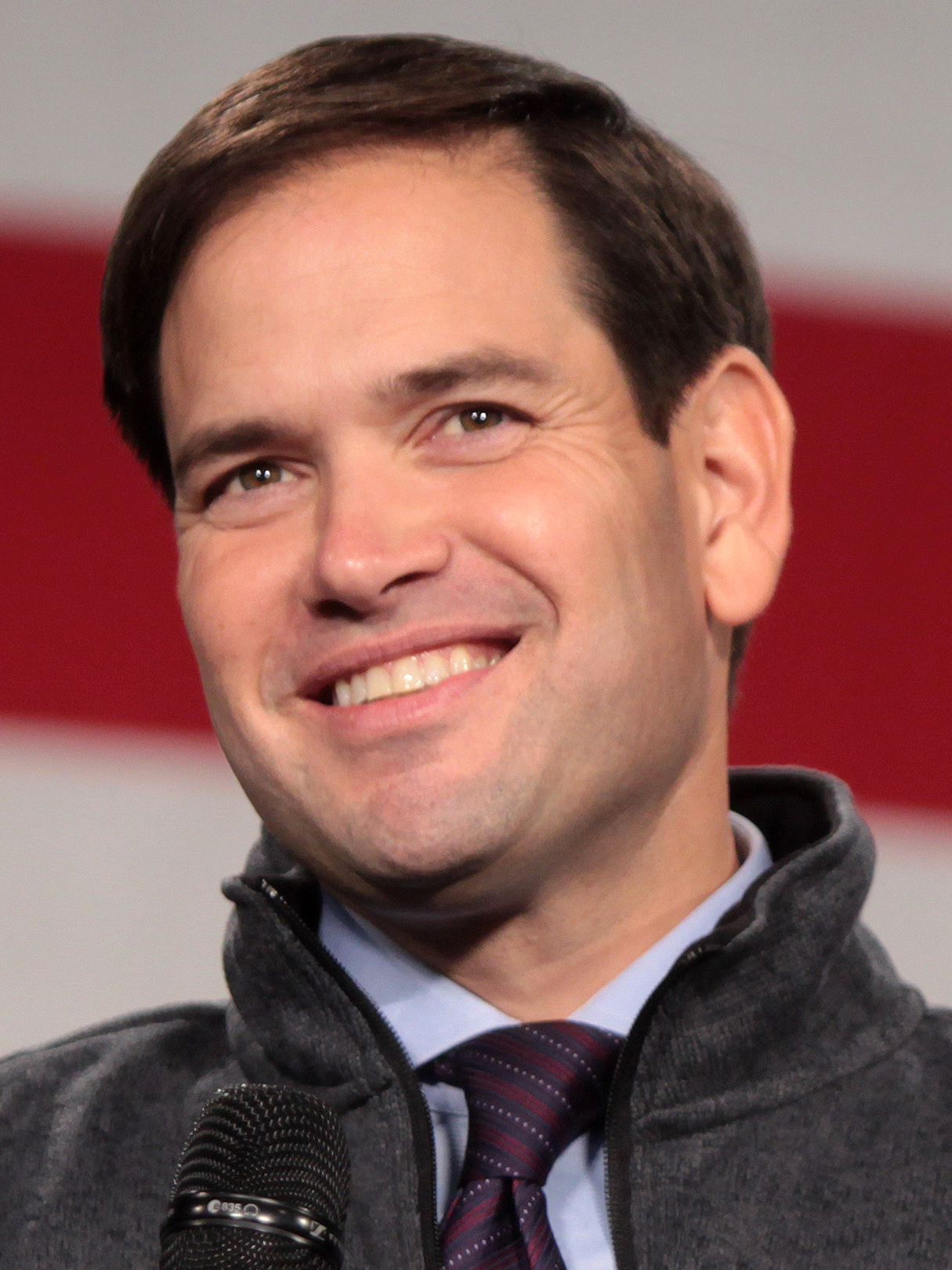

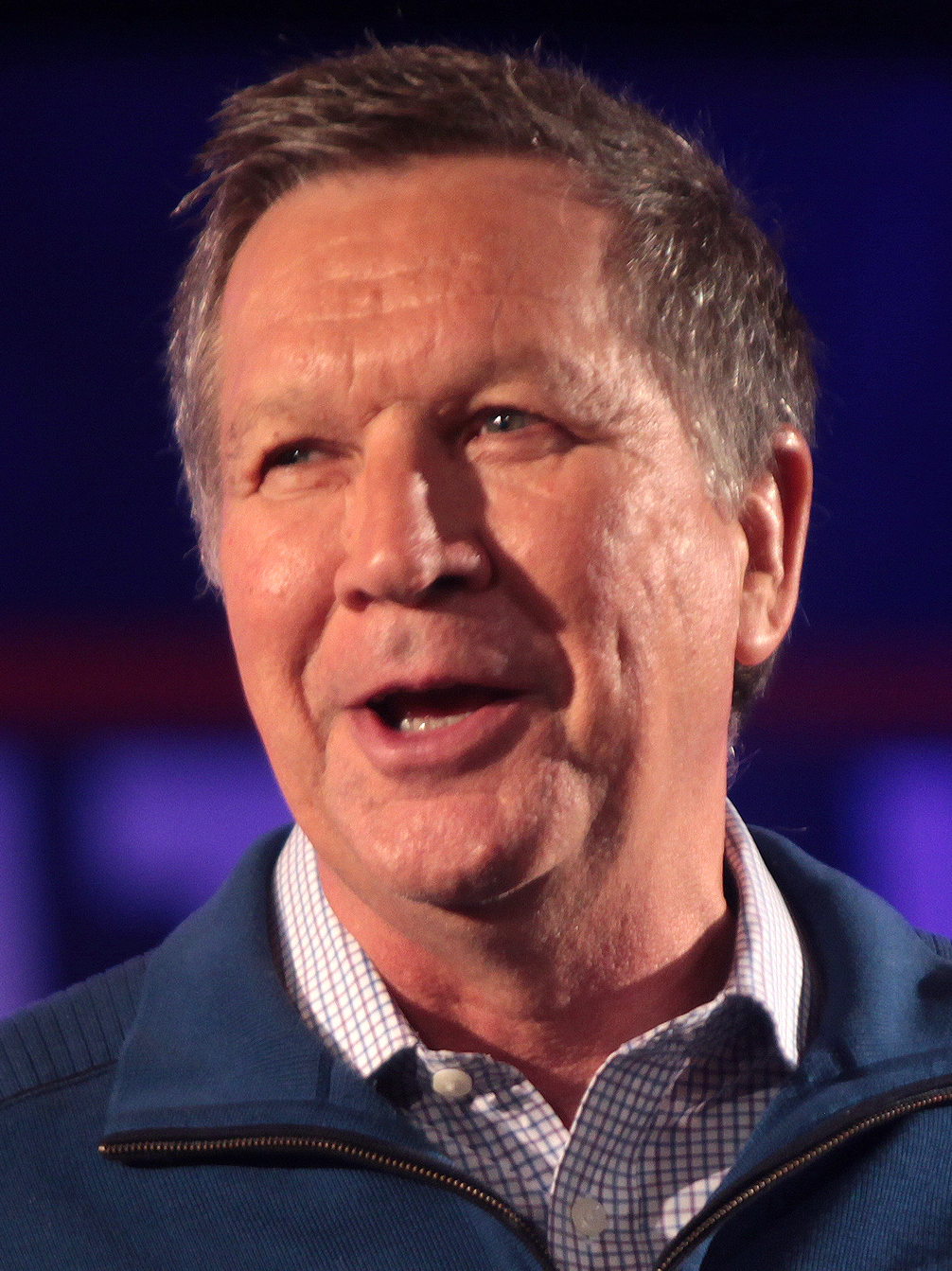
Candidate	Donald Trump	Ted Cruz
Home state	New York	Texas
Delegate count	25	18
Popular vote	124,888	113,888
Percentage	41.45%	37.83%
Candidate	Marco Rubio	John Kasich
Home state	Florida	Ohio
Delegate count	0	0
Popular vote	33,813	19,359
Percentage	11.22%	6.43%
Parish results
Donald Trump 30–40% 40–50% 50–60% 60–70%	Ted Cruz 30-40% 40–50% 50–60%

The 2016 Louisiana Republican presidential primary was held on March 5, 2016, as part of the 2016 Republican Party presidential primaries. In this primary, voters in the United States state of Louisiana voted on who the Republican nominee for President of the United States should be in the 2016 United States presidential election. The Democratic Party held their Louisiana primary on the same day.

The Republican primary in Louisiana was a closed primary, meaning that only registered Republicans could vote in it. It was won by Donald Trump, with Texas Senator Ted Cruz finishing in second place.

== Delegate allocation rules ==
Louisiana's 2016 Republican primary had a total of 46 delegates available. They were allocated as follows:

- 18 delegates were awarded to the winner of one of Louisiana's congressional districts.
- 28 delegates were at-large, meaning they were awarded proportionally based on the percentage of the vote a candidate received in the entire state. Candidates had to receive at least 20 percent of the statewide vote to receive any at-large delegates.
- If any delegates were left over, they became unbound and could support whichever candidate they wanted at the convention.

== Results ==
Louisiana Republican primary, March 5, 2016
Candidate	Votes	Percentage	Actual delegate count		
Candidate	Votes	Percentage	Bound	Unbound	Total
Donald Trump	124,854	41.45%	25	0	25
Ted Cruz	113,968	37.83%	18	0	18
Marco Rubio	33,813	11.22%	0	0	0
John Kasich	19,359	6.43%	0	0	0
Ben Carson (withdrawn)	4,544	1.51%	0	0	0
Jeb Bush (withdrawn)	2,145	0.71%	0	0	0
Rand Paul (withdrawn)	670	0.22%	0	0	0
Mike Huckabee (withdrawn)	645	0.21%	0	0	0
Chris Christie (withdrawn)	401	0.13%	0	0	0
Carly Fiorina (withdrawn)	243	0.08%	0	0	0
Rick Santorum (withdrawn)	180	0.06%	0	0	0
Lindsey Graham (withdrawn)	152	0.05%	0	0	0
Unprojected delegates:			3	0	3
Total:	301,241	100.00%	46	0	46
Source: The Green Papers

== Analysis ==
The Louisiana primary was called for Trump by the Associated Press about half an hour after the polls closed. Trump's victory in Louisiana was seen as evidence against the argument, made by some of his critics, that he would do worse in a closed primary, in contrast to his defeat in the Kansas caucus that was held the same day. It was also viewed as an opportunity to see whether Cruz's campaign was gaining momentum, and whether Cruz was well-positioned to defeat Trump and win the nomination. Trump's relatively narrow victory over Cruz, whom he beat by less than four percentage points, contrasted with many polls of Louisiana in which he had a double-digit lead over Cruz. However, the fact that Trump won the state at all was in line with the results of every primary poll conducted there.

Among those who voted early in the primary, Trump beat Cruz by almost 24 points, but Cruz defeated Trump among those who voted on Election Day, which led the race to be relatively close statewide. The stark contrast between early and Election-Day results led to the Louisiana primary facing criticism from critics of early voting. Trump's strong performance among those who decided who they wanted to vote for further in advance of the primary in Louisiana was different from most previous contests, in which Rubio had generally done better among early deciders.

On December 23, 2015 the Donald J. Trump campaign announced that political advisor Ryan Lambert was selected as Louisiana's Campaign State Director.

== Delegate dispute ==
Initially, because the race in Louisiana was relatively close (Trump won by only 3.6%), Trump and Cruz each received 18 of the state's 46 delegates. Marco Rubio won five more delegates, and the remaining five were "unbound", meaning they could choose to support whichever candidate they wanted. After Rubio withdrew from the race, the five Louisiana delegates that had been pledged to him became "free agents" who, like the five previously unbound delegates, were expected to support Cruz.

In March 2016, it was reported that, despite having lost the Louisiana primary to Trump, Cruz could get more of the state's delegates overall, because he could receive support from more of Louisiana's unbound delegates than was Trump. Despite the reporting of their support to Cruz, a majority of Rubio's delegates rebuked the false reporting and voted with Donald J. Trump.

In response, the Trump campaign announced that they would challenge the delegate distribution in Louisiana, with Trump himself tweeting that a "lawsuit" would be coming. Trump campaign senior adviser Barry Bennett responded by saying that Trump was referring to a "decertification process" that the campaign would pursue through the Republican National Committee.

In response to Trump's claims, Republican Party of Louisiana executive director Jason Dore stated in March 2016 that the proportional delegate allocation rules for Louisiana's primary were adopted before Trump announced his presidential candidacy, and that it was too late by then to change them. Dore also said that Cruz was not going to receive more delegates than Trump, adding, "Everybody's been allocated what they're going to be allocated."

== See also ==
- 2016 Louisiana Democratic presidential primary
