= Ben Carson 2016 presidential campaign =

United States political campaign

Ben Carson for President
- Campaign: 2016 Republican Party presidential primaries
- Candidate: Ben Carson
- Affiliation: Republican Party
- Announced: May 3, 2015
- Suspended: March 4, 2016
- Headquarters: 1800 Diagonal Road, Suite 140; Alexandria, Virginia
- Key people: Robert F. Dees (Campaign Chairman); Ed Brookover (Campaign Manager); Larry Ross (Communications Director); Deana Bass (Press Secretary); Amy Pass (National Finance Director); G. Michael Brown (National Political Director); Donald Green (Head Researcher)
- Receipts: US$54,036,610 (2015-12-31)
- Slogan

Website
- www.bencarson.com (archived - February 2, 2016)

The 2016 presidential campaign of Ben Carson, a pediatric neurosurgeon and bestselling author, was announced May 3, 2015, in an interview with a local television station in Cincinnati, Ohio. He formally announced his candidacy for the Republican nomination in the 2016 presidential election at a rally in his hometown of Detroit on May 4, 2015. On March 4, 2016, Carson officially ended his campaign in a speech at CPAC. He endorsed Donald Trump on March 11. After Trump won the general election, he selected Carson to be his Secretary of Housing and Urban Development, with Carson announcing an additional administration role overseeing the repeal and replacement of the Patient Protection and Affordable Care Act.

== Background ==
=== 2013 National Prayer Breakfast ===
Carson entered the political scene at the 2013 National Prayer Breakfast on February 7. In his speech, he commented on political correctness ("dangerous", because it goes against freedom of expression), education, health care, and taxation. Regarding education, he spoke favorably about graduation rates in 1831, when Alexis de Tocqueville visited the United States, and when "anybody finishing the second grade was completely literate". He espoused the idea of a tax-exempt health savings account created at birth, that can be bequeathed at death, along with an electronic medical record and birth certificate. He supports a flat tax, which he calls the "proportional tax" in reference to the biblical tithe. The speech garnered Carson considerable attention because the event is normally apolitical in nature, and the speech was critical of the philosophy and policies of President Barack Obama, who was sitting less than 10 feet away. Conservative commentators from Rush Limbaugh to Sean Hannity and Neil Cavuto of Fox News praised the speech as an example of speaking "truth to power". The Wall Street Journal published an op-ed article the day after the Prayer Breakfast titled "Ben Carson for President", which said that "the Johns Hopkins neurosurgeon may not be politically correct, but he's closer to correct than anything we've heard in years."

=== Polling ===
Carson was a featured speaker at the 2013 Conservative Political Action Conference (CPAC), and tied for seventh place in the Washington Times/CPAC 2013 Straw Poll with 4% of the 3,000 ballots cast. In the 2014 CPAC straw poll, he came in third place with 9% of the vote, behind senators Ted Cruz of Texas (with 11%) and Rand Paul of Kentucky (31%). In the 2015 CPAC poll, Carson came in fourth behind Paul, Wisconsin governor Scott Walker, and Cruz with 11.4%.

Carson also had a strong showing in the polls at the 2013 and 2014 Values Voter Summits; in 2013, he tied with former Pennsylvania senator Rick Santorum for second place with 13%, behind Ted Cruz's 42%. In 2014, he came in second with 20%, behind Cruz's 25%, and also came in first place in the same group's vice presidential poll.

In February 2014 a Baltimore Sun poll ranked him first among potential Republican candidates, with 24% (Jeb Bush was in second place with 15%); in another during the same month, an online poll of 62,000 conservative activists, Carson came in third. In an interview with The Weekly Standard in May 2014, Carson said that he was "warming up to the idea" of a presidential run. In June 2014, Carson appeared in the first national poll for the 2016 presidential election through Rasmussen. In a hypothetical race against Hillary Clinton, Carson tied with Rand Paul for the strongest showing out of any potential Republican nominee, trailing Clinton by only 7%. Carson also polled well in a Cygnal poll in Alabama, where he came in second behind Jeb Bush.

=== "Draft Ben Carson Committee" and fundraising ===
A group using the catchphrase "Run, Ben, Run" got started to draft him for the Republican nomination. The organization, then called the "National Draft Ben Carson for President Committee" and later known as "The 2016 Committee", was founded by John Philip Sousa IV, a great-grandson of John Philip Sousa. It has also served as the primary fundraiser for a potential campaign, with Sousa reporting on April 12 that the movement had raised over US$4 million, and that a potential campaign apparatus, from television ads to mailing lists, had already been set up. At the end of June 2014, the Draft Committee reported that it had raised over US$7 million from 91,000 donors.

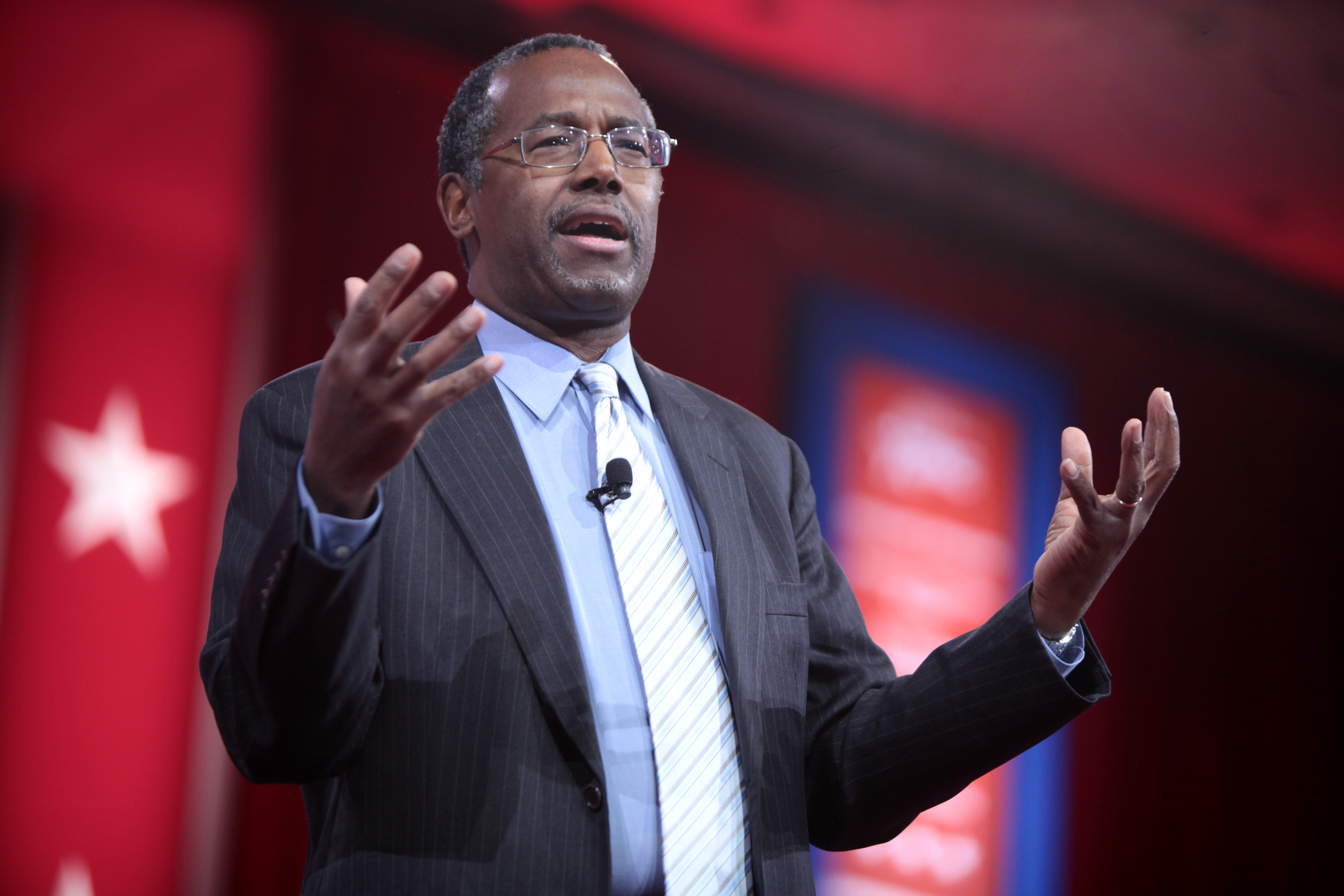
Carson speaking at the 2015 Conservative Political Action Conference (CPAC) in National Harbor, Maryland, on February 26, 2015.

On August 2, 2014, it was reported that Carson had officially approved the formation of his own Political Action Committee, named One Nation, and also appointed Texas businessman Terry Giles as chairman of a potential presidential campaign. Carson suggested that his final decision on whether or not to run would depend on the results of the 2014 midterms, and whether the Republicans would regain control of the U.S. Senate. This announcement came shortly after Sousa reported that the draft committee had raised yet another US$1 million, resulting in US$8 million raised overall.

When interviewed by radio host Hugh Hewitt in late September 2014, Carson said "the likelihood is strong" that he would run for president. In October 2014 Bloomberg Politics reported that the Draft Carson movement out-fundraised the pro-Hillary Clinton PAC Ready for Hillary in the third quarter of 2014, shortly after an Iowa poll by the Des Moines Register showed Carson in second place among potential 2016 candidates, only behind Mitt Romney. He came in second place in a similar Fox News poll, behind former Arkansas governor Mike Huckabee by 1%.

In early November 2014, following the Republicans' recapture of the Senate, Carson announced that he would air an hour-long ad called A Breath of Fresh Air: A New Prescription for America to introduce himself in 22 states. This move, along with Carson's announcement that he was officially switching his political affiliation from independent to Republican, spurred even more speculation that he would run for the Republican nomination.

On November 7, Fox News and Carson confirmed that his relationship with the cable news channel had ended. Carson had been hired by Fox News in October 2013.

In January 2015, The Weekly Standard reported that the Draft Carson Committee had raised US$13 million by the end of 2014, shortly after Carson performed well in a CNN/ORC poll of potential candidates in December 2014, coming in second in two different versions: He came in second with 10% behind Mitt Romney's 20%, but in the same poll with Romney removed from the list, Carson closed the gap with 11% to Jeb Bush's 14%. The Wall Street Journal mentioned that the Draft Carson Committee had chairmen in all of Iowa's 99 counties, and that Carson had recently come in first place in two separate Public Policy polls for the state of Pennsylvania.

The National Draft Ben Carson for President Committee helped make the retired neurosurgeon the first candidate successfully drafted for president since 1964, when Arizona Senator Barry Goldwater, an early leader of conservatism in the United States, won the GOP nomination.

Many considered the fact that Carson has never held public office to be one of his largest obstacles, as only one person, Wendell Willkie, has ever been nominated by a major party without having held public office or flag rank in the armed forces. His lack of political experience, however, also has been acclaimed by both himself and others, as they argue that it shows him to be someone who can relate to the people of the US, rather than being the "typical politician", and that the teams of doctors he has overseen; his nonprofit scholarship program, which is in all 50 states and Washington, D.C.; and especially his corporate board work at Kellogg's and Costco for 18 and 16 years respectively provide him with enough experience for the presidency as well as help him to relate with the people of the real world as president.

== Campaign ==
On May 2, 2015, Carson proclaimed that in two days, he was going to make a major announcement on his decision on whether to enter the presidential race. In an interview with a Cincinnati TV station WKRC (AM) on May 3, 2015, Carson accidentally confirmed his candidacy for president. The interview was also broadcast live on WPEC. The next day, May 4, 2015, at the Music Hall Center for the Performing Arts in his home town of Detroit, he officially announced his run for the Republican nomination in the 2016 U.S. presidential election. The announcement speech was preceded by a choir singing "Lose Yourself" with Carson sitting in the audience. After the song, Carson took the stage and announced his candidacy alongside a rousing speech on his rags to riches life story; at one point, he stated: "I remember when our favorite drug dealer was killed." At the event, he announced his campaign team, which included his campaign manager, Barry Bennett.

In late March 2015, Carson had his first-ever victory in a national poll for the 2016 GOP field when a Fox News poll showed him tied for first place with former Florida governor Jeb Bush (each candidate polled at 13%). He continued to poll well in Fox News polls, later matching this same result in early May. He also tied for first in a Quinnipiac University poll along with four others, all at 10% each; the others were Bush, Mike Huckabee, Marco Rubio, and Scott Walker. In an early June poll by The Economist and YouGov, Carson tied once more with Rubio for first, at 10% each. His first ever first-place performance in a national poll came in mid-June, in a Monmouth University poll that had him at 11%.

In late May, Carson won the presidential straw poll at the 2015 Southern Republican Leadership Conference, with 25.4% of the vote, and in July he came first in a straw poll of the Washington, D.C. Republican Party, with 44%. Carson also came in first in two consecutive annual polls from the Western Conservative Summit; in 2014, he won 22% of the vote, and in 2015, he won with 26% – 224 votes out of 871 total.

In June, a few of the most important officials in Carson's campaign, including his campaign chairman and finance chief and chief legal counsel, left; his super-PACs have been competing against each other and his own campaign fund for funding. An attempt is underway by his departing campaign chairperson, who must first observe a legally-mandated 120-day 'cool-off period', to form a single super-PAC (political action committee) to better channel funds.

In early July, communications director Doug Watts reported that the campaign had raised US$8.3 million over the second quarter of 2015 alone, via 210,000 donations from 151,000 donors. Later that same month, the Des Moines Register reported that Carson had raised more money in Iowa than any other Republican candidate, and in the overall general election field, was rivaled in Iowa fundraising only by Democratic frontrunner Hillary Clinton.

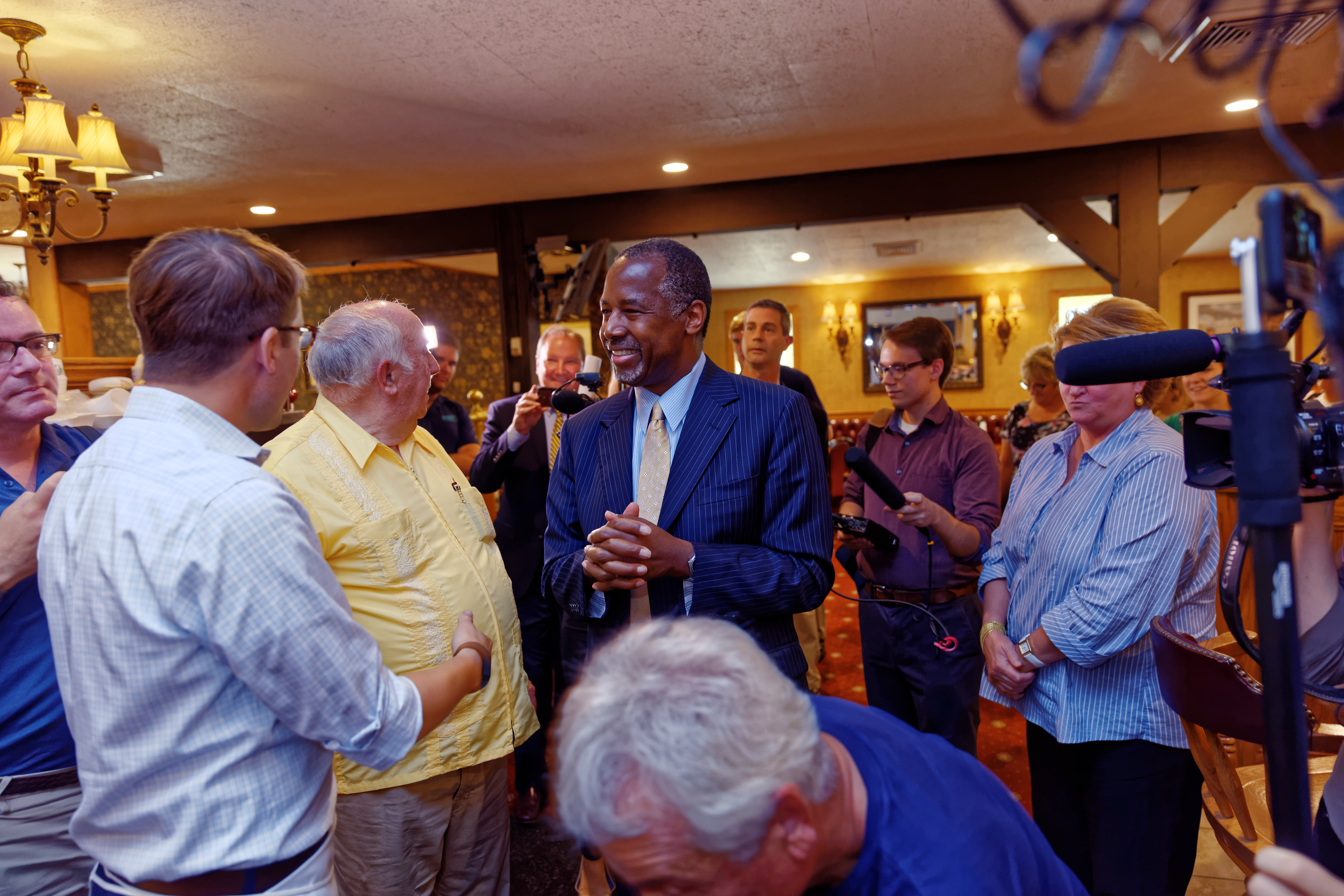
Carson meeting with supporters in New Hampshire, August 2015.

In September 2015, Carson came in second in the Values Voter Summit presidential straw poll for the third consecutive year, once again only behind Ted Cruz, receiving 18% of the vote.

=== Post-debate surge ===
Carson successfully qualified for the first presidential debate of the 2016 cycle, hosted by Fox News, coming in 5th place in the overall list of the top 10 candidates.

Carson's performance in the first debate was well-received overall, and in a Suffolk University poll held afterward, Carson was the second-highest performing candidate in the question of who won the debate, with 22%; only Florida Senator Marco Rubio polled higher, by a margin of only 1%. A Fox News poll released after the debate showed that Carson had the biggest average increase in poll performance and approval ratings after the debate; his average increase in most national polls was 5%, or a 71% overall increase in his position. In the immediate aftermath of the debate, Carson saw a bigger increase in his social media followers than any other Republican candidate; he gained 24,000 new Twitter followers (a 10% increase) and 230,000 more likes on his Facebook page (a 12% increase), as well as a 37% increase in Instagram followers.

Carson quickly began to rise in many national polls, eventually polling in double digits and securing second place, only behind Trump. Carson subsequently saw a significant increase in two major aggregate polls for the Republican nomination, from Real Clear Politics and The Huffington Post - in both cases, he rose to the #3 spot in the race for the nomination, behind Jeb Bush and Donald Trump, by mid-August. By late August, he had increased his lead in said aggregate polls even further to rise to the #2 position, only behind Trump. His rise had further fueled the perception that candidates with little to no political experience, like Carson and Trump, were the new favorite types of candidates among potential primary voters. It also led some commentators to believe that Carson's soft-spoken and calm mannerisms were actually working in his favor among potential voters, in contrast to more conventional rhetoric or the blunt language of such candidates as Trump; this was also noted in Carson repeatedly having the highest ratings out of all the Republican candidates in regards to personal favorability.

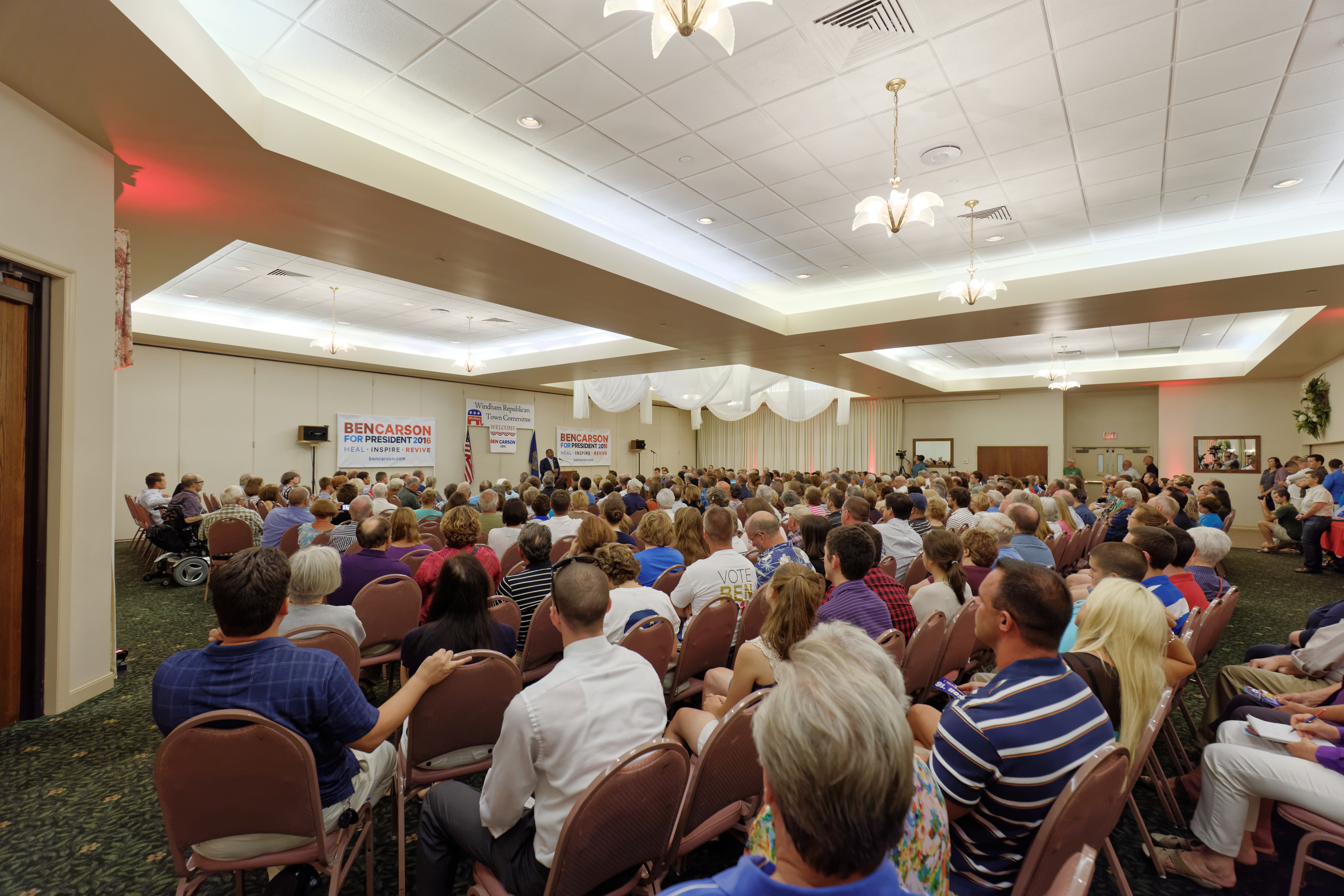
Ben Carson in New Hampshire, 13 August 2015

Carson's performance in the second debate was also very well-received, and solidified his status as the second highest-polling candidate. Over the course of the three-hour debate and the hours immediately after, Carson's Facebook page gained an additional 500,000 likes. Less than 10 days after the debate, Carson's Facebook page reached 4 million likes, thus garnering the highest amount of Facebook likes out of any candidate in the 2016 election, from either party.

Carson's surge after the debates also translated well into his national poll standing in general election match-ups. Since late August, Carson became one of the few Republican candidates (alongside Trump, Bush, and Carly Fiorina) who began to develop a lead over Democratic frontrunners Hillary Clinton, Joe Biden, and Bernie Sanders, in polls from such organizations as Public Policy Polling, CNN, Quinnipiac University, NBC, Fox News, and The Morning Consult. Eventually, these leads resulted in Carson becoming the one and only Republican candidate who developed a lead over Hillary Clinton in both major aggregate polls, from the Huffington Post and Real Clear Politics.

On September 30, it was reported that Carson's campaign had raised US$20.2 million in the third quarter of 2015, thus bringing the campaign's grand total to US$31 million. The additional US$20.2 million was raised through just over 600,000 donations from 353,000 individuals, and altogether was more money raised than the entirety of the 2012 GOP field up to that same point in 2011, and was the highest amount raised by any candidate in the 2016 field; the next-highest was Bush, who raised US$13.4 million. Carson also had the second-highest amount of money on hand at the end of the third quarter, with US$12 million, only behind Ted Cruz's US$13.5 million. In the same period, The 2016 Committee reported that it had raised US$2.8 million and had reached a new total of 31,000 volunteers.

=== Autumn of 2015 ===
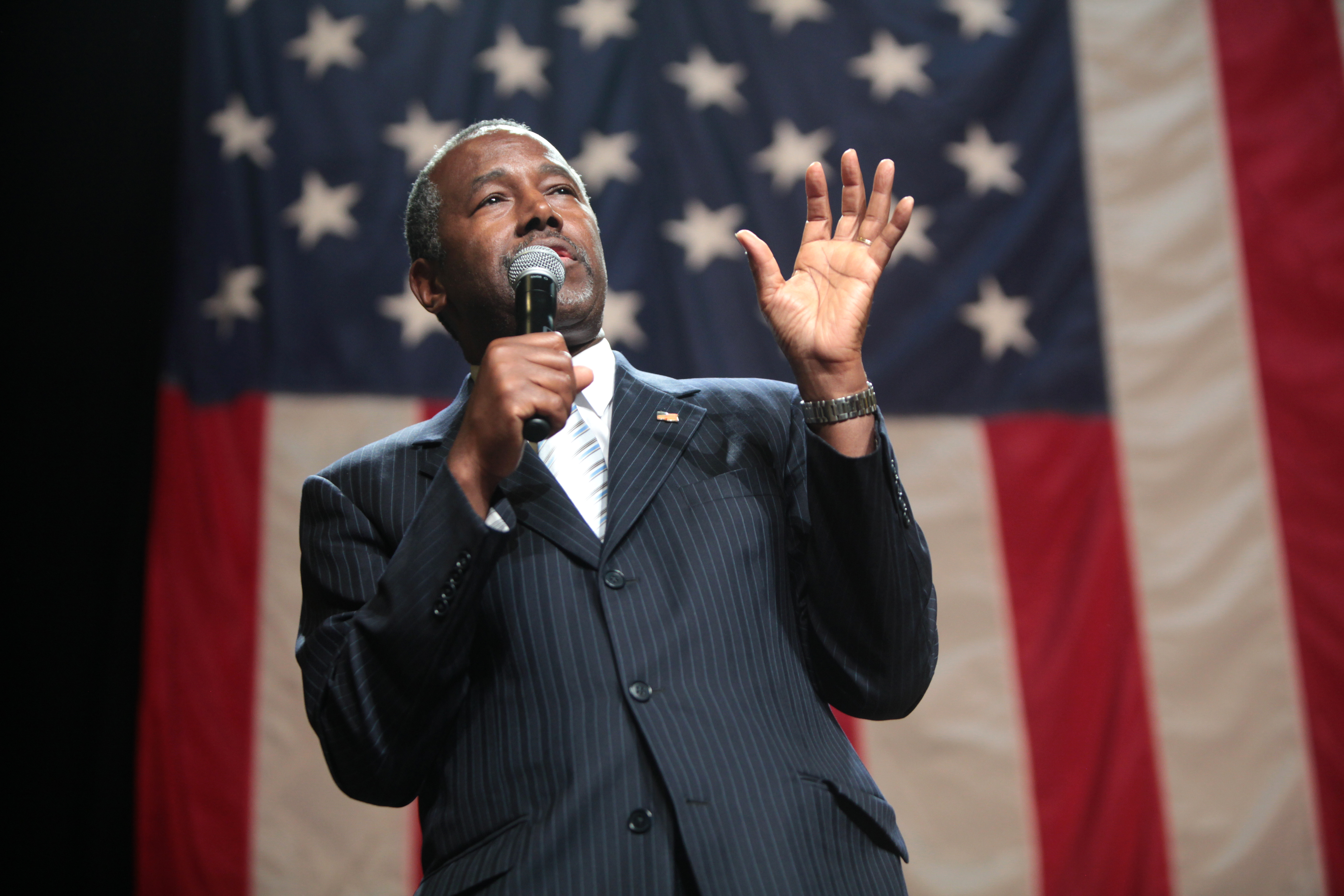
Carson speaking at an event in Phoenix, Arizona.

As the fall of 2015 began, Carson's rise in the polls began to enter the low 20s and solidified Carson as the #2 candidate by double-digit leads over the remaining candidates, while narrowing down the gap between Carson and Trump. This was marked by an NBC News and The Wall Street Journal poll where Carson garnered 20% of the vote to Trump's 21%, a Fox News poll where Carson had 23% to Trump's 24%, and eventually taking the lead himself in an IBD/TIPP poll, with 24% to Trump's 17%. With the latter poll, Carson became the first Republican candidate in over two months to take first place over Trump in any national poll, since Jeb Bush in late July. An op-ed article released in conjunction with the Fox News poll declared that Carson was "giving Trump a run for his money" in the race for the nomination. By mid-October, Carson had increased his standing in national general election polls, with his leads over Hillary Clinton increasing to 3.5% in the Real Clear Politics poll, and 5.6% in the Huffington Post poll.

On October 14, it was reported that Carson was temporarily halting his presidential campaign in order to do a two-week promotional tour for his latest book, A More Perfect Union. However, Carson stated that it was not a suspension of his campaign, and he would still be holding private fundraising events throughout the two-week period. During the two-week period, Carson joined with frontrunner Donald Trump in threatening a boycott of CNBC over conditions for the third debate, which would be held at the end of Carson's book tour. The two of them demanded that the debate be limited to a maximum running time of two hours (in response to the previous debate on CNN running for over three hours), and also that opening and closing statements be allowed from the candidates; otherwise, if the conditions were not met, both Carson and Trump would withdraw from the debate. On October 16, CNBC announced that it had accepted the demands of Carson and Trump, setting the two-hour maximum and allowing for opening and closing statements.

As the fall continued, Carson began to increase his lead in numerous statewide polls. In addition to coming in second, behind Trump, in many crucial primary states, Carson took the lead himself in both Utah and Louisiana, and tied for first with Trump in Michigan, Pennsylvania, and the crucial state of Florida. Most prominently, Carson took the lead in two consecutive Iowa polls in late October, thus becoming the first candidate to take the lead in the state since Trump took the lead from Scott Walker in mid-July. Hoping to continue Carson's momentum, the two main super PACs backing Carson - The 2016 Committee, focusing primarily on small donations, and Our Children's Future, focusing on larger donations - announced on October 22 that they would be combining their efforts, pooling together all funds raised and coordinating their advertising campaigns, in the hope that it would be enough to boost Carson past Trump into first place.

=== End of 2015 ===
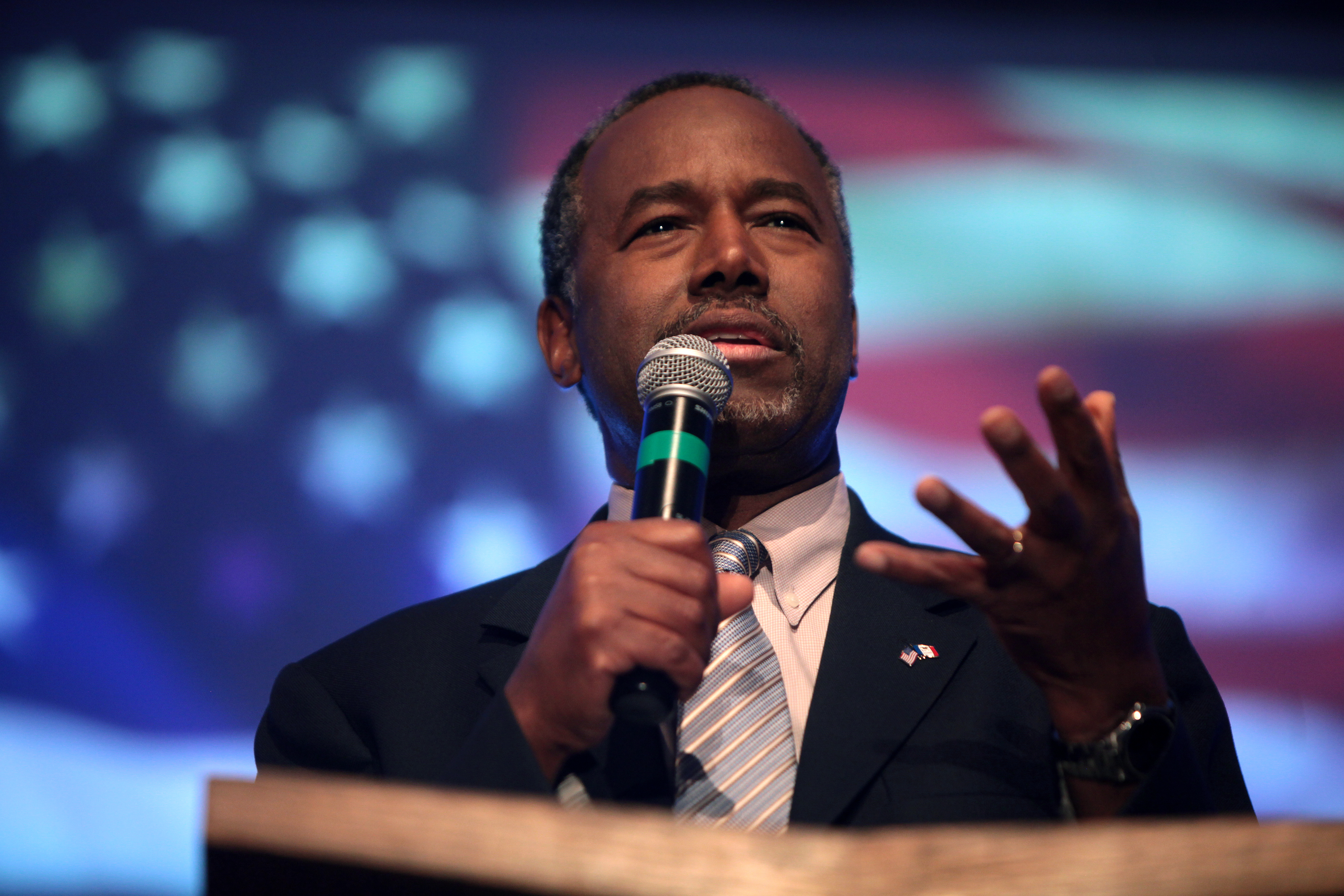
Ben Carson speaking at a church service in Des Moines, Iowa.

Both immediately before and immediately after the third debate, Carson began to match Trump for first place in several nationally recognized polls. Prior to the third debate, Carson came in first in a CBS News/The New York Times poll with 26% to Trump's 22%. After the debate, he came in first in two consecutive NBC polls; in a joint poll between NBC and The Wall Street Journal, Carson had 29% to Trump's 23%, and in another joint poll between NBC and SurveyMonkey, both men tied at 26% each. With these poll numbers, Carson closed the gap with Trump in most aggregate polls, and even became the first candidate since Trump's rise to claim first place in both the Real Clear Politics and "270 to Win" aggregate polls, in early November. Carson also further expanded his polling in individual states, taking the lead in Oklahoma and tying for first, with Trump, in Texas. Lastly, Carson came in a narrow second behind Trump in a statewide poll in the early state of New Hampshire, but was well within the poll's margin of error and thus statistically tied with Trump, thus eclipsing Trump in both of the first two primary states.

With his rise in the polls and a subsequent rise in focus, as well as numerous threats against his campaign, Carson, along with Trump, was approved to receive Secret Service protection on November 5. This made both Carson and Trump two of the earliest instances of presidential candidates receiving Secret Service protection in American history, over a year before the general election.

Throughout late October and early November, Carson began to face increased media scrutiny over his biographical narrative and repeatedly pushed back against most criticisms. Coming off the third Republican debate on CNBC, where the moderators were perceived as displaying a liberal bias, Carson capitalized on the media scrutiny and claimed it was also the result of media bias, which subsequently increased his popularity and donations considerably; his campaign reported raising $3.5 million in the first week of November alone. Carson continued to increase his leads in statewide polls, matching Trump for first in Arizona, Georgia, Virginia, and Maryland, while also taking the lead in North Carolina and the significant state of Colorado. In a final showing before his national numbers dropped out of the double digits, Carson tied for first (alongside Trump) in statewide polls in Tennessee and California.

In November 2015, Carson's campaign aired a 60-second TV advertisement in which excerpts from Carson's stump speech were intercut with a rap by an artist named Aspiring Mogul. They spent $150,000 on the ads, which were aired in Atlanta, Detroit and Miami. Carson initially weakly defended the ad, saying "Well, there are people in the campaign who felt that was a good way to do things ... I support them in doing that, but I probably would have taken a little different approach." He then later said the advertisement was done without his knowledge, that "it was done by people who have no concept of the black community and what they were doing", and that he was "horrified" by it. A reporter pointed out that the advertisement contained an explicit approval statement from Carson, and he replied "Well, obviously. But you notice no more of those kind of ads coming out now."

After these events and the November 2015 Paris attacks, Carson started slipping in the polls, falling 10 points in Iowa, amid scrutiny of his lack of credentials on foreign affairs. Towards the end of November, Carson made an overseas trip to visit the Azraq refugee camp in Jordan, which was housing refugees of the Syrian Civil War, as part of trying to bolster his foreign policy expertise. Upon returning he stated that rather than refugees coming to the United States, as was being debated, they should be sheltered in nearby countries in the Middle East. In early December, the 2015 San Bernardino attack added to the focus of national security issues in the campaign.

By mid-December, Carson's poll numbers had fallen dramatically, both nationwide and in Iowa, where he was polling strongly. A national Quinnipiac poll showed Carson's support dropping from 23 to 16%, while a CBS poll showed Carson's plummeting from 26 to 13%, and an NBC/Wall Street Journal poll showed an even more dramatic decrease, from 29 to 11%. In the Real Clear Politics average of national polls, Carson's position had fallen from first with 24.8% on November 5 to fourth with just 13.2%, behind Trump, Rubio, and Cruz, as of December 13. In Iowa, Carson's support had fallen from 28 to 13% according to a Monmouth University poll, and from 32 to 13% in a Des Moines Register/Bloomberg poll. His polling average, which had previously reached 29.3% by late October, had fallen to 13.0% by mid-December. Three of Carson's top campaign advisers, campaign manager Barry Bennett, communications director Doug Watts and deputy campaign manager Lisa Coen, resigned from the campaign in late December 2015. Carson hired retired Major Gen. Robert Dees as his new campaign chairman and Ed Brookover as the new campaign manager.

=== Early 2016 ===
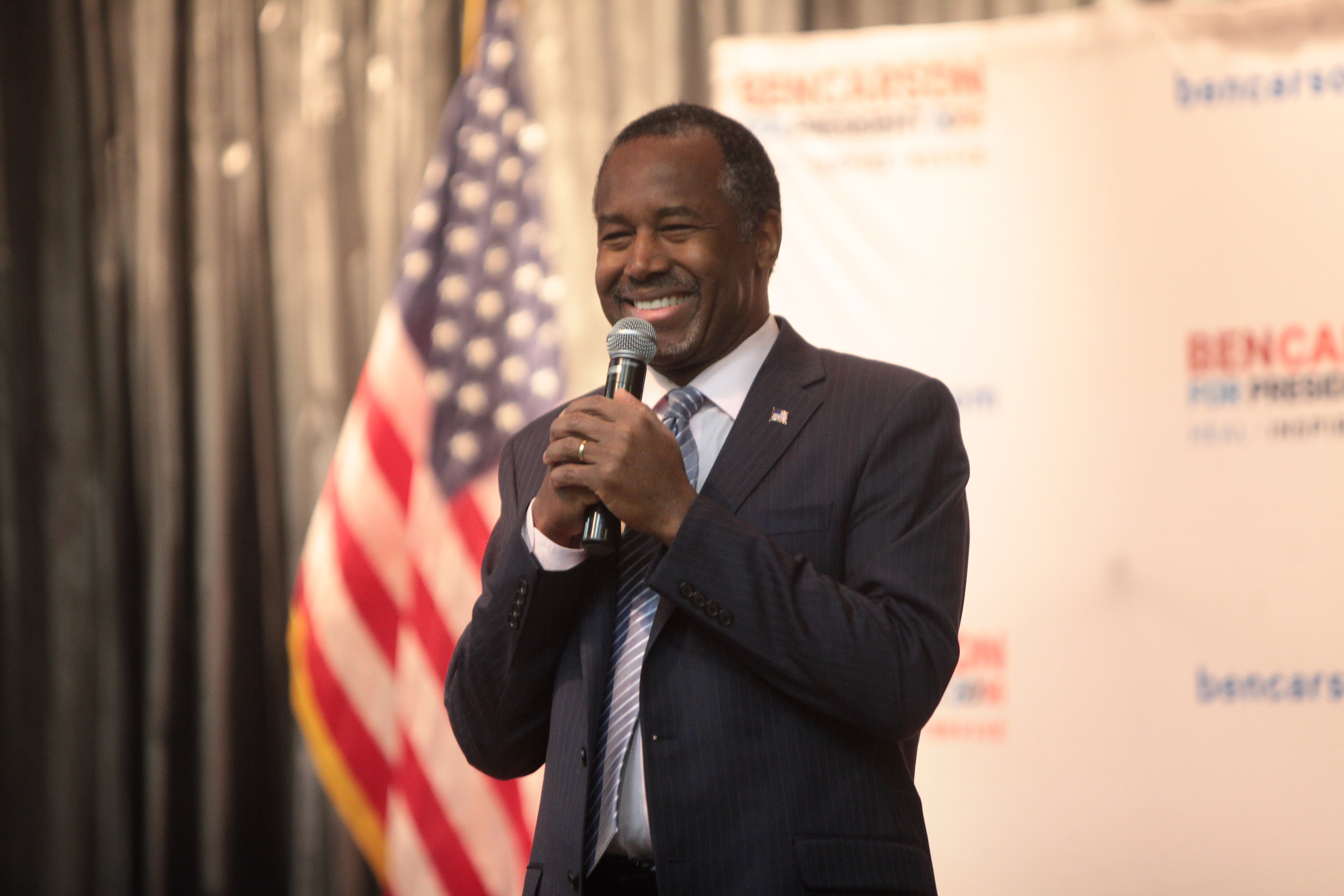
Ben Carson speaking before the Nevada caucuses in February 2016.

In January 2016, Carson lost Sam Pimm, executive director of the pro-Carson super PAC the 2016 Committee, along with all of the PAC's staff in New Hampshire, when they resigned their positions and endorsed GOP rival Ted Cruz.

On January 19, a campaign volunteer, Braden Joplin, 25, was killed and three others injured in a car accident on Interstate 80 near Atlantic, Iowa. The campaign released a statement on the crash: "A van transporting three campaign volunteers and a Carson campaign employee hit a patch of ice and flipped on its side where it was struck by another vehicle." In response, Carson cancelled campaign stops in South Carolina and California, and instead chose to be with Joplin's family at a hospital in Omaha, Nebraska.

In the Iowa Caucuses on February 1, Carson came in 4th place with 9% of the vote (over 17,000 popular votes), thus earning 3 delegates. However, a significant controversy arose when CNN said that Carson was taking a break from the campaign trail. Members of Ted Cruz's campaign caught wind of the story, and began telling voters at the caucuses that Carson had dropped out. Carson accused Cruz's campaign of doing this explicitly to switch potential Carson voters to Cruz, an accusation that front runner Donald Trump also began to use against Cruz. Carson leveled these accusations at Cruz consistently over the next few days, particularly during the 8th GOP debate in New Hampshire on February 6. Carson suffered a poor showing at the New Hampshire primary, polling at 2.3%, and receiving 0 delegates. During the debate on February 6, he apparently missed his introduction from the moderator, and could be seen waiting apprehensively offstage while other candidates passed by.

On March 2, following the Super Tuesday primaries, Carson announced that he did "not see a political path forward" and would not attend the next Republican debate in Detroit. He said, however, that "this grassroots movement on behalf of 'We the People' will continue", stating that he would give more details March 4. On March 4, Carson officially ended his campaign in a speech at CPAC.

=== Results ===
In total, Carson received 857,039 votes during the Republican primaries; this total represented 2.75% of the votes cast. He received the support of seven delegates at the Republican National Convention. Trump received the Republican nomination and went on to be elected president on November 8, 2016.

== Political and related positions ==
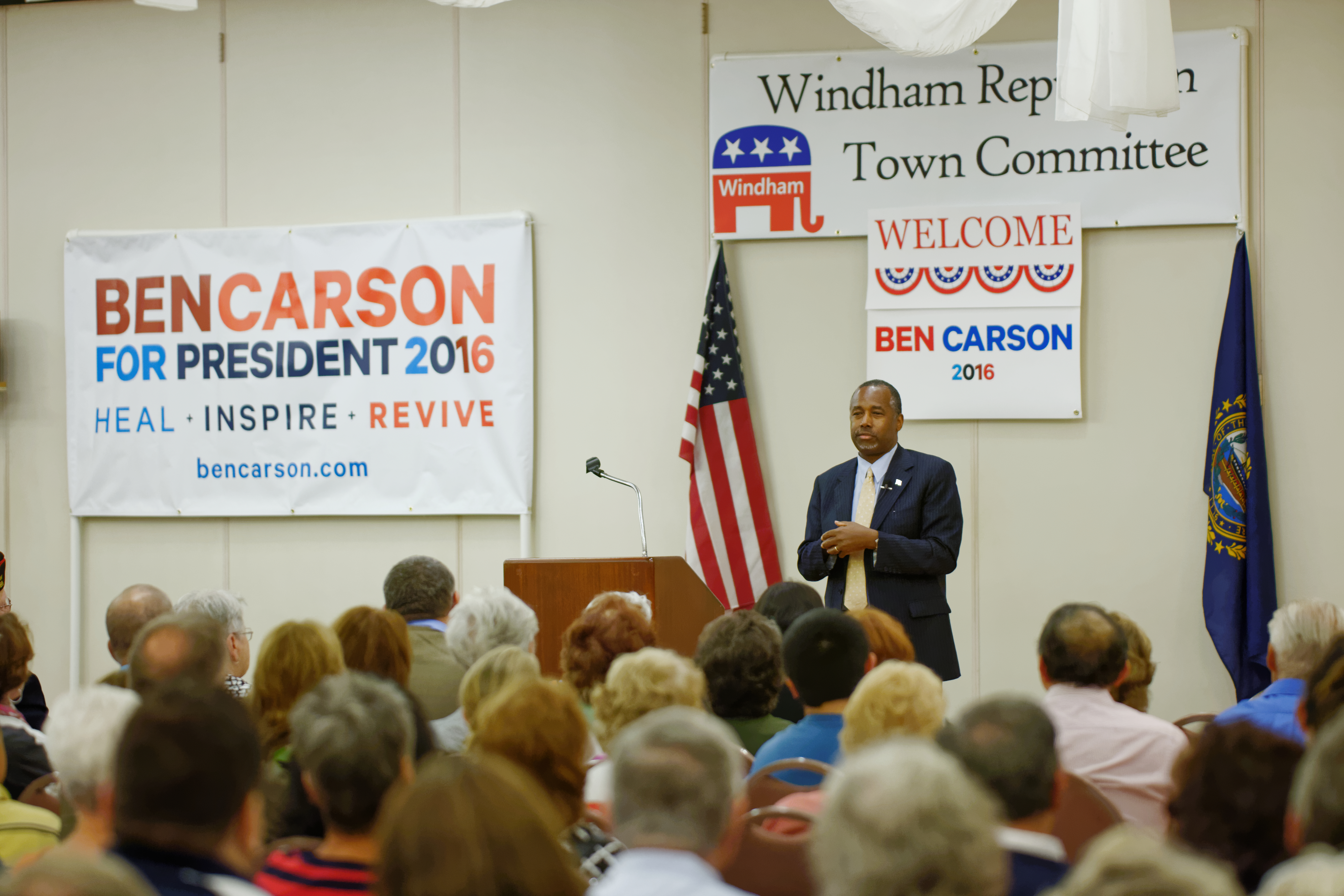
Carson in New Hampshire, August 13, 2015

=== Abortion and human fetal tissue ===
Carson has described himself as pro-life, comparing women who have abortions to historical slave owners, and supports overturning the 1973 Supreme Court decision in Roe v. Wade. He opposes access to abortion in virtually all cases, including pregnancies resulting from incest or rape, but would consider allowing its use if a woman's health is in danger. In August 2015, Carson said, "The number-one cause of death for black people is abortion."

After undercover videos recorded by an anti-abortion group showed Planned Parenthood officials discussing the donation of tissue from aborted fetuses for medical research, Jen Gunter, an obstetrician-gynecologist and blogger, subsequently identified research that Carson himself had performed and published using tissue from fetuses aborted in the 9th and 17th weeks of gestation. Carson defended his past use of tissue from aborted fetuses for medical research in part, by stating, "to not use the tissue that is in a tissue bank, regardless of where it comes from, would be foolish. Why would anybody not do that?" Carson also told The Washington Post: "If you're killing babies and taking the tissue, that's a very different thing than taking a dead specimen and keeping a record of it."

=== Climate change ===
Carson rejects the scientific consensus that human activity causes climate change; in November 2014, he said: "there's always going to be either cooling or warming going on", and he found the debate on climate change "irrelevant" and a distraction from protecting the environment.

In 2015, Carson expressed his disbelief about the scientific consensus on climate change, at a Commonwealth Club forum in San Francisco. After this statement, Governor Jerry Brown of California sent Carson a flash drive containing the Intergovernmental Panel on Climate Change's Synthesis Report, which details the scientific evidence of human impact on climate change. Carson's response to the San Francisco Chronicle was: "There is no overwhelming science that the things that are going on are man-caused and not naturally caused."

=== Economic issues ===
==== Budget and Social Security ====
Carson blames Washington politicians for the national debt and supports a balanced budget amendment to the United States Constitution, but has not explained how he would cut spending or raise revenue to achieve a balanced budget. In May 2015, Carson said that "I don't think we should even talk about entitlements until we fix the economy, and I think fixing the economy is not going to be difficult." Former head of the Congressional Budget Office Douglas Holtz-Eakin criticized this statement, noting the U.S. debt is primarily "attributable to significant growth" in entitlement spending (i.e., Social Security and Medicare).

Carson proposed raising the minimum age to receive Social Security benefits to extend the program's solvency.

==== Taxation ====
In August 2015, Carson proposed instituting a flat tax on personal and corporate income, and a capital gains tax of 10%; Carson claiming inspiration by the biblical concept of tithing. Citizens for Tax Justice found that this plan would "raise only 32 percent of the revenue of the current tax system and pay for only 28 percent of estimated government spending" and "would increase the deficit by $3 trillion in just one year", even with every tax deduction eliminated.

Carson referred to progressive taxation as "socialism" in the first Republican primary debate, proposing that the U.S. abandon its current graduated personal income tax system in favor of a flat tax. Carson specifically proposed a 14.9% flat tax on both personal and business income, applying to income above 150 percent of the federal poverty level. Citizens whose income is at or below that level would be required to make an annual de minimis tax payment. Carson also proposed eliminating the capital gains tax, the alternative minimum tax, and the estate tax; and individual taxes on dividends and interest. The plan would do away with deductions and other tax breaks. Along with a flat tax, Carson has advocated for a national luxury tax on "very expensive" goods.

==== Financial and other regulation ====
Although most of Carson's economic policy beliefs reflected "current Republican orthodoxy", he diverged from other Republican presidential candidates in his support for reinstating Glass-Steagall, a Depression-era law that separated commercial and investment banks and was repealed in 1999. Carson believes the repeal of Glass-Steagall helped foster growth in banks that made them too big to fail.

Carson was a critic of regulations more broadly, arguing that "every single regulation costs money" and hurts consumers.

==== Minimum wage and employment ====
During the 2016 presidential campaign, Carson initially said the current federal minimum wage of $7.25 should "possibly" or "probably" be higher. He supported a two-tiered minimum wage system, with a lower "starter" minimum wage for young workers. He also supported indexing the minimum wage to inflation, "so that we never have to have this conversation again in the history of America." At a Republican primary debate in November 2015, however, Carson argued against increasing the minimum wage.

In October 2015, Carson called the size of the federal workforce "absurd" and called for reducing it by attrition. In June 2015, Carson told a crowd of Republicans in Iowa that he was "thinking very seriously" about adding "a covert division of people who look like the people in this room, who monitor what government people do."

==== Trade policy ====
Carson praised the concept of free trade, but voiced objections to the Trans-Pacific Partnership, calling for the deal to be renegotiated, "because right now we have a lot of special interest groups who benefit."

=== Education ===
In an October 2015 interview, Carson stated: "I actually have something I would use the Department of Education to do. It would be to monitor our institutions of higher education for extreme political bias and deny federal funding on that basis." This controversial suggestion was criticized by various commentators, who questioned its constitutionality and practicality.

Carson asserted that the AP U.S. History overemphasizes wrongdoing (such as slavery, Japanese internment, and atrocities against American Indians) by the United States, saying: "I think most people, when they finish that course, they'd be ready to go sign up for ISIS."

In February 2015, at the annual Conservative Political Action Conference, Carson said: "I've found that homeschoolers do the best, private schoolers next best, charter schoolers next best, and public schoolers worst." On that basis, he advocated school choice. Carson was a critic of the Common Core State Standards.

=== Evolution ===
Carson's views on evolution and creationism have been controversial. In a 2006 debate, Carson stated: "I don't believe in evolution ... I simply don't have enough faith to believe that something as complex as our ability to rationalize, think, and plan, and have a moral sense of what's right and wrong, just appeared."

In a 2011 speech to Seventh-day Adventists, entitled "Celebration of Creation", Carson said Darwin's theory of evolution "was encouraged by the adversary and it has become what is scientifically, politically correct"; with "the adversary" being interpreted as a reference to Satan. Carson also labeled the theory of the Big Bang as "ridiculous", saying, "Here you have all these highfalutin scientists and they're saying it was this gigantic explosion and everything came into perfect order ... I mean, you want to talk about fairy tales, that is amazing." Carson defended his comments in 2015, saying in regard to the scientific concepts, "I'm not going to denigrate you because of your faith and you shouldn't denigrate me for mine."

In 2014, Carson rejected the validity of carbon dating, as it "really doesn't mean anything to a God who has the ability to create anything at any point in time". Carson further argued against evolution, stating his disbelief in the possibility of the "complexity of the human brain" arising "from a slime pit full of promiscuous biochemicals".

In October 2015, Carson stated that he does accept the idea of natural selection, but there is only evidence for microevolution (changes in allele frequencies that occur over time within a species), which he believes was the result of "a wise creator who gave his creatures the ability to adapt to their environment so that he wouldn't have to start over every 50 years", whereas "there's never been one species that's turned into another species, that can be proved."

=== Firearms regulation and Nazi Germany comparisons ===
Carson stated in 2013 that semi-automatic firearms should be better regulated in large cities and high-crime areas. This statement attracted criticism from conservative opponents of gun control. Carson has declined to backtrack from that view, but says he is strongly in favor of the Second Amendment, and while guns being used on innocent people was "horrible" but "not nearly as horrible as having a population that is defenseless against a group of tyrants who have arms". Carson made similar remarks in October 2015. Carson stated on the campaign trail also said that if he were in a position of national authority, he would allow citizens to own any weapons, including automatic and semi-automatic guns, that they could legally buy.

Carson has advanced the Nazi gun control theory, asserting in his book, A Perfect Union, that gun control made it easier for the Holocaust to occur: "Through a combination of removing guns and disseminating deceitful propaganda, the Nazis were able to carry out their evil intentions with relatively little resistance." In an interview with CNN's Wolf Blitzer, Carson made similar claims. Holocaust historian Alan E. Steinweis called Carson's stance "strangely ahistorical" because "no serious work of scholarship on the Nazi dictatorship or on the causes of the Holocaust" features "Nazi gun control measures ... as a significant factor." Jonathan Greenblatt, national director and CEO of the Anti-Defamation League, also criticized the remarks, calling them "mind-bending".

=== Free speech and Nazi Germany comparisons ===
In March 2014, when asked about his previous claim that Americans were living "in a Gestapo age", Carson said that the United States is "very much like Nazi Germany ... [there] you had a government using its tools to intimidate a population." Carson stated that the "PC police" as well as politicians and the media "stifle people's conversation" and make them "afraid to say what they actually believe."

In October 2015, Carson said he would "beg to differ" with people who thought America would never become something akin to Nazi Germany; stating: "If you go back and look at the history of the world, tyranny and despotism and how it starts, it has a lot to do with control of thought and control of speech." When questioned about whether he was comparing President Obama to Hitler, Carson said: "No. I am saying in a situation where people do not express themselves, bad things can happen."

In the same month, The Washington Post called Carson "the biggest fan of Nazi metaphors in politics" in America, noting that Carson "doesn't shy away from holding up Nazi Germany as a dire warning of the slippery slope America is on" and had invoked Nazi Germany or Hitler in comments on various topics, including American society and "how a general population kept their mouth shut"; Obama supporters; socialists; gun rights; and Planned Parenthood.

=== Healthcare ===
Carson has been critical of the Patient Protection and Affordable Care Act, saying in 2013 that "Obamacare is really I think the worst thing that has happened in this nation since slavery ... And it is in a way, it is slavery in a way, because it is making all of us subservient to the government, and it was never about health care. It was about control." As an alternative to the Affordable Care Act, Carson said in 2013: "Here's my solution. When a person is born, give him a birth certificate, an electronic medical record and a health savings account." In arguing that the Affordable Care Act gave the government "control of the people", Carson several times invoked a spurious quote from Vladimir Lenin.

In a December 2014 op-ed for The Washington Times, Carson wrote: "we need to remove health care from the political arena and recognize that any government proposals affecting the health of all citizens should be free market-based and should be so appealing that it would not be necessary to force citizens into the program."

As a presidential candidate, Carson supported abolishing Medicare and Medicaid, moving dollars out of these "traditional health care" programs to fund new health savings accounts. Carson proposed having the government contribute $2,000 to each individual's account annually, with individuals and employers permitted to contribute additional funds to the accounts, and unspent funds being allowed to be shared within a family. Carson has said that his plan "makes every family have their own insurance company." Carson estimated that his plan would cost the federal government $630 billion annually; this figure, however, does not account for population growth, inflation, or administrative costs.

Separately, Carson called in a 2014 op-ed for a system "similar to Medicare and Medicaid" for a group that Carson terms the "5 percent of patients with complex pre-existing or acquired maladies." The cost of this system is not factored into Carson's $630 billion figure. In October 2015, Carson said if someone preferred the current Medicare or Medicaid programs to the health-savings-account approach, "I'm not going to deny you the privilege of doing that."

In a 1992 essay published in the Harvard Journal of Minority Public Health, Carson wrote that technological advancement will eventually lead to many people surviving their 100th birthdays, and questioned the merits of prolonging life, citing the fact that "up to half of the medical expenses incurred in the average American's life are incurred during the last six months of life". and noting the advantages of "dignity of dying in comfort" in a home setting. Carson advocated for a partially-government run plan, writing that on end-of-life care: "Decisions on who should be treated and who should not be treated would clearly require some national guidelines." In January 2015, Carson stated that his views have evolved since 1992.

=== History of ancient Egypt ===
In a 1998 commencement speech at Andrews University, Carson publicly expressed the view that the Pyramids of Giza were not tombs, but grain silos built by Joseph, the Biblical son of Jacob, in preparation for the famine depicted in the Book of Genesis. He added that "various scientists" say ancient astronauts could have designed the structures, but to Carson, "it doesn't require an alien being when God is with you". Popular in medieval Europe, the belief that Joseph had the pyramids built as granaries was perpetuated by, among others, Gregory of Tours in the sixth century, an Irish monk in the ninth century named Bernard, a mosaic in St. Mark's Basilica dating from the twelfth, and the travelogue attributed to John Mandeville in the fourteenth.

In 2015, Carson reiterated his views on the Egyptian pyramids. Archaeologists reject the notion that the pyramids were used to store grain, noting that the pyramids were not hollow, ancient Egyptian granaries have been well-studied, there is evidence of burials inside the pyramids, and the ancient Egyptians left funerary instructions inside them. Additionally, the Bible states that Joseph's grain was kept in cities.

=== Immigration ===
In the Washington Times, Carson wrote: "Once illegals have legal status, it will be difficult to deny them any of the multitudinous entitlements that are freely distributed throughout our society." Carson believes that illegal immigrants should be able to register as guest workers and have a pathway to apply for permanent resident status.

In August 2015, Carson suggesting using drones to secure the U.S.-Mexico border. Carson said he did not favor "killing people" with drones, but favored using drones for surveillance and strikes to eliminate "the caves that are utilized to hide people" illegally entering the U.S. from Mexico.

In September 2015, Carson said that due to the difficulty in deporting illegal immigrants, he would instead prioritize sealing the borders of the United States, which "in the Carson administration that would be done in the first year". He also said that "you have to also turn off the spigot that dispenses the goodies so that people don't have any incentive to come here".

In November 2015, Carson twice likened Syrian refugees to "rabid dogs" and suggested that they posed a risk to American society.

=== Marijuana and drug policy ===
In 2014, Carson said that "I think medical use of marijuana in compassionate cases certainly has been proven to be useful" but said that he opposed legalization of recreational marijuana. Carson believes marijuana is a gateway drug. On the legalization of recreational marijuana in Colorado, Carson said "I don't think this is something that we really want for our society. You know, we're gradually just removing all the barriers to hedonistic activity and you know, it's just, we're changing so rapidly to a different type of society and nobody is getting a chance to discuss it because, you know, it's taboo."

In an appearance on Glenn Beck's show, Carson said he would "intensify" the war on drugs.

=== Marriage and LGBTQ issues ===
In March 2013, Carson described his views about same-sex marriage on Hannity, saying: "Marriage is between a man and a woman. No group, be they gays, be they NAMBLA, be they people who believe in bestiality, it doesn't matter what they are. They don't get to change the definition." The comments caused controversy. GLAAD criticized Carson for having "equated gays" with those from the North American Man/Boy Love Association and supporters of bestiality. A number of students at the Johns Hopkins School of Medicine, "enraged by Carson's comparison of homosexuality with bestiality and pedophilia", called upon Carson to withdraw as a commencement speaker. Carson withdrew as speaker and apologized for his remarks, saying that he was not equating those groups. He said:

You know, as a Christian ... I have a duty to love all people and that includes people who have other sexual orientations, and I certainly do, and never had any intention of offending anyone. What I was basically saying, and if anybody was offended, I apologize to you. But what I was basically saying is that there is no group. I wasn't equating those things. I don't think they're equal. Just, you know, if you ask me for apple and I give you an orange you would say, well that's not an orange. And then I say, that's a banana, that's not an apple either. And there's a peach, that's not an apple, either. But it doesn't mean that I'm equating the banana and the orange and the peach. And in the same way I'm not equating those things.

Carson further said "the examples were not the best choice of words" and that the Bible "says we have an obligation to love our fellow man as ourselves, and I love everybody the same—all homosexuals." According to Carson, "I was trying to say that as far as marriage was concerned, it has traditionally been between a man and a woman and no one should be able to change that." Carson continued to clarify his comments in later years: "That point was if you change the definition of marriage for one group, you'll have to change it for the next group and the next group", which was characterized as a slippery slope argument by The Washington Post.

In a 2015 Facebook post, Carson wrote that he supports civil unions for gay couples and he has "for many years". Carson, while on the boards for Costco and food manufacturer Kellogg's, supported initiatives for employment non-discrimination, health insurance for domestic partners, and diversity training.

Later in 2015, reacting to an ordinance in Houston, Texas, that would have permitted those who are transgender to enter a bathroom designated for the gender with which they identify, Carson proposed the idea of transgender bathrooms, saying: "It is not fair for them to make everybody else uncomfortable. ... I think everybody has equal rights, but I'm not sure that anybody should have extra rights – extra rights when it comes to redefining everything for everybody else and imposing your view on everybody else."

In a March 2015 interview with Chris Cuomo, Carson stated he believes homosexuality is a choice, saying, "A lot of people go into prison straight, and when they come out, they're gay." Later, in a Facebook post, Carson wrote that he "realized that my choice of language does not reflect fully my heart on gay issues. I do not pretend to know how every individual came to their sexual orientation. I regret that my words to express that concept were hurtful and divisive. For that I apologize unreservedly to all that were offended."

In October 2014, the Southern Poverty Law Center (SPLC) added Carson to its "anti-gay extremist" list, citing Carson's "linking gays with pedophiles" and other comments; in February 2015, the SPLC removed Carson's name from its list and apologized to him.

=== Foreign affairs and defense ===
In 2015, Carson's "main national security adviser" was Robert F. Dees, a retired Army major general who, like Carson, argues that national security is linked to spiritual values. Dees wrote in his book Resilient Nations (2014) that the greatest threat to America was not terrorism, China, or Russia but rather the decline of its "spiritual infrastructure". Dees writes:

At the height of Roman decadence, good became evil and evil became good ... One can rightly argue that the United States is frightfully close to a similar fate. Prayerfully, it is not too late.

In several interviews, Carson has endorsed the views of the political theorist W. Cleon Skousen, an author popular among Tea Party supporters, recommending Skousen's book The Naked Communist (1958). In a July 2014 interview, Carson cited Skousen and suggested that nefarious Marxist forces were plotting to use the mainstream media to undermine the United States, saying: "There was a guy who was a former CIA agent by the name of Cleon Skousen who wrote a book in 1958 called The Naked Communist, and it laid out the whole agenda. You would think by reading it that it was written last year—showing what they're trying to do to American families, what they're trying to do to our Judeo-Christian faith, what they're doing to morality." An endorsement from Carson appears on the front cover of the most recent edition of Skousen's book. Peter Wehner, a senior fellow at the Ethics and Public Policy Center who served in the last three Republican administrations, said that Carson views Skousen's work as "an interpretive key to America today."

==== Syria ====
Carson has expressed a number of often contradictory positions on the role of the United States in the Syrian Civil War. Carson initially opposed the Obama administration's proposed military intervention in Syria in September 2013, claiming that the rebels it would be in support of posed a national security threat to the United States and Israel, and disputing the allegation that the Syrian government was responsible for the use of chemical weapons.

By September 2015, Carson had changed his position on the Assad regime, calling for forcing ISIL out of Iraq in order to allow the group to focus on overthrowing the Assad regime, whilst continuing to advocate non-intervention in Syria.

In November 2015, Carson once again opposed U.S. assistance to Syrian rebels, instead supporting a political solution in Syria, culminating in a coalition government that would include Assad. He justified his new position by criticizing the United States' support for rebels in the first Libyan Civil War.

=== Religious freedom and separation of church and state ===
In a 2014 op-ed article, Carson argued that the First Amendment's Establishment Clause has been "reinterpreted" by progressives away from its original intent, writing that "our Judeo-Christian values have taken a big hit in recent years" although "we have not yet reached the point of a totally godless government." He said in May 2015: "To try to impose one's religious beliefs on someone else is absolutely what we should not be doing. That goes in both directions."

During a September 2015 Meet the Press interview, in response to Chuck Todd's question "Should a President's faith matter [to voters]?", Carson said that if a faith is "inconsistent with the values and principles of America, then of course it should matter." Todd continued with, "So do you believe that Islam is consistent with the constitution?" to which Carson said, "No, I don't, I do not [believe so]. I would not advocate that we put a Muslim in charge of this nation. I absolutely would not agree with that." Carson maintained that sharia (Islamic law) is "something that is against the rights of women, against the rights of gays, subjugates other religions, and a host of things that are not compatible with our Constitution." In a subsequent interview, Carson said that "anybody, doesn't matter what their religious background, if they accept American values and principles and are willing to subjugate their religious beliefs to our Constitution. I have no problem with them."

== Endorsements ==
Ben Carson endorsements

Governors (current and former)

- Al Quie, former Governor of Minnesota

U.S. Representatives (current and former)

- Andy Harris, Representative from Maryland
- Kerry Bentivolio, former Representative from Michigan

State legislators

- Alabama State Senator: Trip Pittman
- Hawaii State Senator: Sam Slom
- Iowa State Representative: Rob Taylor
- Michigan State Senator: Mike Shirkey
- Two New Hampshire State Representatives: Bob Giuda (former Deputy Majority Leader), Joseph Fleck (former)

Individuals

- Charles W. Pickering, retired federal judge

Celebrities, commentators, and activists

- Vitor Belfort, MMA fighter
- Kirk Cameron, actor
- Kelsey Grammer, actor
- Roger McGuinn, lead singer of The Byrds
- Richard Petty, seven-time NASCAR Champion
- Mickey Rourke, actor
- Curt Schilling. MLB Pitcher
- Armstrong Williams, radio/print/television commentator, former Reagan staffer who helped make Martin Luther King's birthday a federal holiday

== See also ==
- 2016 United States presidential election
- Republican Party presidential candidates, 2016
- Republican Party presidential primaries, 2016
- Republican Party presidential debates, 2016
