= Robert F. Dees =

United States Army general

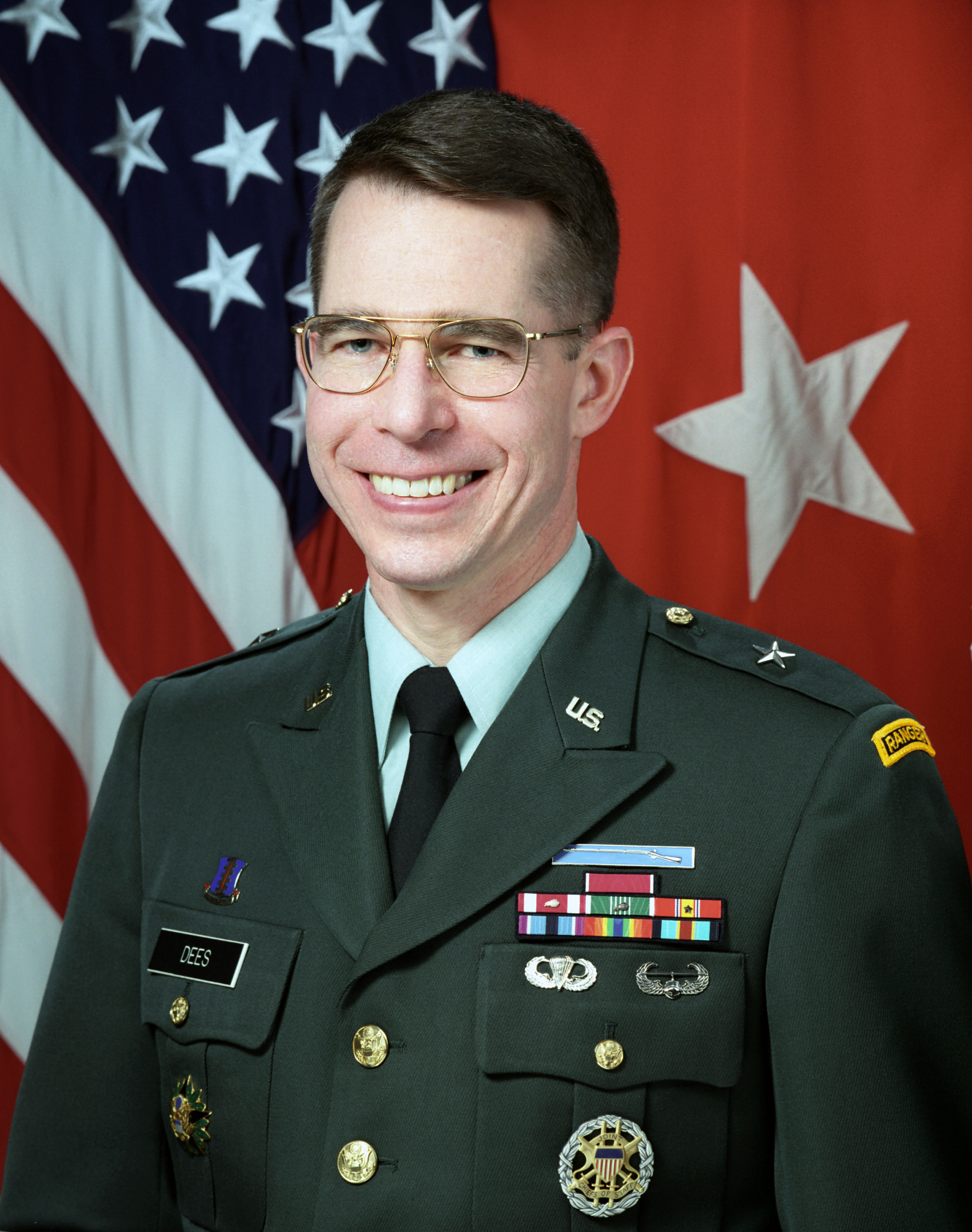
- Dees as a Brigadier General in 1996
- Born: February 2, 1950 (age 76); Amarillo, Texas
- Military career
- Allegiance: United States
- Branch: United States Army
- Service years: 1972 - 2003
- Rank: Major General
- Awards: Defense Distinguished Service Medal

Robert Frank Dees (born February 2, 1950, in Amarillo, Texas) is a retired major general in the United States Army. A specialist on national security issues, he was the chairman of the Ben Carson campaign for the Republican presidential nomination in 2016.

He was the vice director for operational plans and interoperability for the Department of Defense. He was also Assistant Division Commander of the 101st Airborne Division; Commander, 2nd Infantry Division, U.S. Forces Korea; Deputy Commander of V Corps in Europe; and Commander, U.S.-Israeli Joint Task Force for Missile Defense. After he officially retired from the U.S. military on January 1, 2003, he worked for the next two years as the executive director of Defense Strategies for Microsoft Corporation. In 2005, he became the executive director of Military Ministry, focusing on soldiers coming home from the war with post-traumatic stress. After writing the Resilience Trilogy, he was appointed and currently serves as Associate Vice President of Military Outreach and Director, Institute for Military Resilience, at Liberty University. Dees was also the Defense and National Security Advisor for Republican presidential candidate Dr. Ben Carson. He and wife, Kathleen (née Robinson), serve as volunteer leaders in numerous outreaches to the military, including Military Community Youth Ministries. On December 31, 2015, he was appointed campaign chairman of the Ben Carson presidential campaign, 2016. Following the Carson Campaign, Dees expanded his public speaking about resilience and veterans issues, also becoming a board member on the Lindell Foundation and the Lindell Recovery Network. In August 2019 he became President of the Stone Ridge Foundation whose purpose is "Returning Healthy Veterans to America." In 2020 Dees founded The National Center For Healthy Veterans in Altivistia Va.

== Career ==
Dees graduated from the US Military Academy in 1972, he was commissioned as a second lieutenant of Infantry and awarded a Bachelor of Science degree. He also holds a master's degree in operations research from the Naval Postgraduate School. His military education includes the Infantry Officer Basic and Advanced Courses, the US Army Command and General Staff College, and the Industrial College of the Armed Forces. He was also a Research Fellow at the Royal College of Defence Studies in London and is a registered Professional Engineer in the State of Virginia.

Dees served in a wide variety of command and staff positions culminating in his last three assignments as Assistant Division Commander for Operations, 101st Airborne Division (Air Assault); Commander, Second Infantry Division, United States Forces Korea; and as Deputy Commanding General, V Corps in Europe, concurrently serving as Commander, US-Israeli Combined Task Force for Missile Defense. He commanded airborne, air assault, and mechanized infantry forces from platoon through division level.

== Books ==
Dees has written a trilogy of books on resiliency. The books in the trilogy are Resilient Warriors, Resilient Leaders and Resilient Nations. He has also written Resilience God Style book and study guide, produced the Resilience God Style nine-week video series which is available on Right Now Media, and developed the Resilience God Style Training Game.

== Policies ==
Dees in 2015 was the "main national security adviser" to presidential candidate Ben Carson. Dees has argued a theme that has been adopted by Carson linking national security to spiritual values. Dees argues in Resilient Nations (2014) that the greatest threat to America is not terrorism or China or Russia but rather the decline of its "spiritual infrastructure.” Dees writes:

At the height of Roman decadence, good became evil and evil became good .... One can rightly argue that the United States is frightfully close to a similar fate. Prayerfully, it is not too late.
