= Nationwide opinion polling for the 2016 Republican Party presidential primaries =

This is a list of nationwide public opinion polls that were conducted relating to the Republican primaries for the 2016 United States presidential election. The persons named in the polls were either declared candidates, former candidates, or received media speculation about their possible candidacy. On May 4, 2016, Donald Trump became the sole contender and presumptive nominee.

== Aggregate polling ==
Poll source	Date(s) included or updated	Ted Cruz	John Kasich	Donald Trump	Others
HuffPost Pollster Model	Updated May 8, 2016	23.4%	13.7%	56.5%	Undecided 5.0% Other 2.7%
FiveThirtyEight Average	Updated May 1, 2016	28.8%	18.2%	43.9%	
270 to Win Average	April 12 – May 1, 2016	27.0%	18.0%	46.5%	
RealClear Politics Average	April 12 – May 1, 2016	27.0%	18.0%	46.5%	

== Individual polls ==
=== Polls conducted in 2016 ===
Summary of the opinion polls taken since January 2016 for the Republican Party presidential primaries

Poll source	Sample size	Margin of error	Date(s) administered	Jeb Bush	Ben Carson	Ted Cruz	John Kasich	Marco Rubio	Donald Trump	Others (Note: Named candidates are listed in footnotes; remainder is the combined total of "someone else," undecided, or none of the above.)
NBC News/SurveyMonkey	3389	± 2.3%	May 2–8, 2016			21%	13%		60%	6%
Ipsos/Reuters	423	± 5.3%	April 30 – May 4, 2016			27%	17%		55%	2%
Morning Consult	723	± 2.0%	April 29 – May 2, 2016			20%	13%		56%	11%
CNN/ORC	406	± 5.0%	April 28 – May 1, 2016			25%	19%		49%	4%
NBC News/SurveyMonkey	3479	± 2.2%	April 25 – May 1, 2016			22%	14%		56%	7%
Morning Consult	757	± 2.0%	April 26–29, 2016			27%	12%		48%	13%
IBD/TIPP	354	± 5.0%	April 22–29, 2016			29%	16%		48%	9%
Ipsos/Reuters	762	± 4%	April 23–27, 2016			28%	17%		49%	5%
YouGov/Economist	499	± 2.8%	April 22–26, 2016			28%	19%		49%	4%
Suffolk University/USA Today	292	± 5.7%	April 20–24, 2016			29%	17%		45%	9%
NBC News/SurveyMonkey	2633	± 2.6%	April 18–24, 2016			26%	17%		50%	7%
Ipsos/Reuters	546	± 4.8%	April 16–20, 2016			31%	16%		49%	4%
Pew Research	740	± %	April 12–19, 2016			25%	20%		44%	3%
Morning Consult	780	± 2.0%	April 15–17, 2016			26%	13%		46%	15%
NBC News/SurveyMonkey	3333	± 2.3%	April 11–17, 2016			28%	19%		46%	7%
NBC News/Wall Street Journal	310	± 5.57%	April 10–14, 2016			35%	24%		40%	1%
Fox News	419	± 4.5%	April 11–13, 2016			27%	25%		45%	2%
Ipsos/Reuters	622	± 4.5%	April 9–13, 2016			32%	21%		44%	4%
CBS News	399	± 6%	April 8–12, 2016			29%	18%		42%	10%
YouGov/Economist	502	± 2.8%	April 8–11, 2016			25%	18%		53%	4%
NBC News/SurveyMonkey	3225	± 2.3%	April 4–10, 2016			30%	16%		46%	8%
Ipsos/Reuters	584	± 4.6%	April 2–6, 2016			38%	19%		39%	3%
Morning Consult	770	± 2.0%	April 1–3, 2016			27%	14%		45%	14%
Public Religion Research Institute/The Atlantic	785	± 2.5%	March 30 – April 3, 2016			32%	21%		36%	10%
NBC News/SurveyMonkey	3353	± 2.2%	March 28 – April 3, 2016			28%	18%		45%	9%
IBD/TIPP	388	± 5.1%	March 28 – April 2, 2016			31%	19%		38%	11%
McClatchy/Marist	444	± 4.7%	March 29–31, 2016			35%	20%		40%	4%
Ipsos/Reuters	665	± 4.3%	March 27–31, 2016			33%	19%		44%	5%
YouGov/Economist	525	± 2.8%	March 26–29, 2016			29%	18%		48%	5%
NBC News/SurveyMonkey	1611	± 3.4%	March 21–27, 2016			27%	18%		48%	7%
Pew Research Center	834	± 2.4%	March 17–27, 2016			32%	20%		41%	1%
Public Policy Polling	505	± 4.4%	March 24–26, 2016			32%	22%		42%	4%
Morning Consult	803	± 2.0%	March 24–26, 2016			28%	10%		49%	13%
Ipsos/Reuters	583	± 4.6%	March 19–23, 2016			28%	20%		45%	7%
Mclaughin	436	± 3.1%	March 17–23, 2016			28%	16%		45%	10%
Fox News	388	± 5.0%	March 20–22, 2016			38%	17%		41%	4%
Bloomberg/Selzer	366	± 5.1%	March 19–22, 2016			31%	25%		40%	5%
Morning Consult	754	± 2.0%	March 18–21, 2016			26%	13%		45%	16%
Quinnipiac	652	± 3.8%	March 16–21, 2016			29%	16%		43%	12%
Monmouth University	353	± 5.2%	March 17–20, 2016			29%	18%		41%	6%
CNN/ORC	397	± 5.0%	March 17–20, 2016			31%	17%		47%	4%
CBS News/New York Times	362	± 6.0%	March 17–20, 2016			26%	20%		46%	4%
Morning Consult	758	± 2.0%	March 16–18, 2016			27%	14%		43%	17%
Rasmussen	719	± 4.0%	March 16–17, 2016			28%	21%		43%	8%
NBC News/SurveyMonkey	3489	± 2.5%	March 14–20, 2016			24%	16%	6%	45%	8%
Ipsos/Reuters	605	± 4.4%	March 12–16, 2016			24%	9%	13%	46%	7%
Morning Consult	1516	± 2.0%	March 11–13, 2016			23%	9%	12%	42%	14%
NBC News/SurveyMonkey	2280	± 3.1%	March 7–13, 2016			24%	12%	11%	44%	8%
YouGov/Economist	400	± 2.9%	March 10–12, 2016			22%	11%	10%	53%	4%
Ipsos/Reuters	639	± 4.3%	March 5–9, 2016			24%	13%	13%	41%	5%
Morning Consult	781	± 2.0%	March 4–6, 2016			23%	10%	14%	40%	13%
NBC News/Wall Street Journal	397	± 4.9%	March 3–6, 2016			27%	22%	20%	30%	1%
ABC News/Washington Post	400	± 5.5%	March 3–6, 2016			25%	13%	18%	34%	9%
Super Tuesday
NBC News/SurveyMonkey	6,481	± 2.1%	February 29 – March 6, 2016		8%	20%	9%	18%	39%	6%
Ipsos/Reuters	542	± 4.6%	February 27 – March 2, 2016		10%	16%	10%	20%	41%	4%
NBC News/SurveyMonkey	8,759	± 1.8%	February 22–28, 2016		8%	18%	7%	21%	40%	6%
Morning Consult	777	± 2%	February 26–27, 2016		9%	15%	5%	14%	44%	12%
CNN/ORC	427	± 5%	February 24–27, 2016		10%	15%	6%	16%	49%	4%
YouGov/Economist	456	± ?%	February 24–27, 2016		7%	21%	8%	17%	44%	3%
SurveyMonkey	1,946	± 3.5%	February 24–25, 2016		8%	19%	8%	21%	39%	6%
Morning Consult	1430	± 2.6%	February 24–25, 2016		9%	14%	5%	19%	42%	11%
IBD/TIPP Poll	400	± 5%	February 19–24, 2016		8%	20%	7%	18%	31%	
Rasmussen Reports/Pulse Opinion Research	697	± 4%	February 21–22, 2016		8%	17%	12%	21%	36%	
South Carolina primary
Ipsos/Reuters	553	± 4.8%	February 20–24, 2016	3%	8%	22%	8%	13%	42%	4%
NBC News/SurveyMonkey	3368	± 2.4%	February 15–21, 2016	4%	8%	19%	8%	16%	36%	8%
Fox News	404	± 4.5%	February 15–17, 2016	9%	9%	19%	8%	15%	36%	4%
Ipsos/Reuters	517	± 4.9%	February 13–17, 2016	9%	10%	17%	9%	11%	40%	5% (Note: Jim Gilmore with 1%)
Morning Consult	662	±?%	February 15–16, 2016	7%	11%	12%	3%	14%	41%	12%
NBC News/Wall Street Journal	400	± 4.9%	February 14–16, 2016	4%	10%	28%	11%	17%	26%	4%
CBS News/New York Times	581	± 5.0%	February 12–16, 2016	4%	6%	18%	11%	12%	35%	6%
Robert Morris	259	± 3.0%	February 11–16, 2016	5.8%	12.4%	18.5%	3.9%	14.3%	37.8%	7.3%
YouGov/Economist	472	± ?%	February 11–15, 2016	6%	7%	19%	11%	16%	39%	2%
USA Today/Suffolk University	358	± 5.2%	February 11–15, 2016	6%	4%	20%	7%	17%	35%	12%
Quinnipiac	602	± 4%	February 10–15, 2016	4%	4%	18%	6%	19%	39%	10%
Morning Consult	710	± 3.7%	February 10–11, 2016	8%	10%	17%	4%	10%	44%	6%
New Hampshire primary
NBC News/SurveyMonkey	3411	± 1.1%	February 8–14, 2016	4%	8%	18%	7%	14%	38%	10% (Note: Chris Christie with 2% and Carly Fiorina with 1%)
Ipsos/Reuters	513	± 4.7%	February 6–10, 2016	7%	11%	23%	2%	14%	35%	9% (Note: Chris Christie and Carly Fiorina with 3% each)
Morning Consult	4287	± 1%	February 3–7, 2016	6%	9%	17%	2%	15%	38%	14% (Note: Chris Christie with 3% and Carly Fiorina with 2%.)
Rasmussen	725	± 4%	February 3–4, 2016	4%	5%	20%	6%	21%	31%	12% (Note: Chris Christie and Carly Fiorina with 3% each)
Quinnipiac University	507	± 4.4%	February 2–4, 2016	3%	6%	22%	3%	19%	31%	16% (Note: Chris Christie with 3% and Carly Fiorina with 2%.)
Public Policy Polling	531	± 4.3%	February 2–3, 2016	5%	11%	21%	5%	21%	25%	14% (Note: Chris Christie and Carly Fiorina with 3% each, Rick Santorum with 1%.)
Morning Consult	641	± 3.9%	February 2–3, 2016	5%	9%	14%	2%	12%	38%	13% (Note: Chris Christie with 3%, Carly Fiorina and Rand Paul with 2% each.)
NBC News/SurveyMonkey	2887	± 2.7%	February 1–7, 2016	3%	7%	20%	3%	17%	35%	13% (Note: Rand Paul with 5%, Chris Christie and Carly Fiorina with 3% each, Jim Gilmore with 1%, Rick Santorum with 0%.)
February 1: Iowa caucuses
Ipsos/Reuters	631	± 4.4%	January 30–February 3, 2016	7%	8%	16%	3%	14%	36%	15% (Note: Chris Christie with 5%, Mike Huckabee, Carly Fiorina, and Rand Paul with 2% each, Jim Gilmore and Rick Santorum with 0% each.)
Morning Consult	1491	± 2.5%	January 29–February 1, 2016	7%	9%	12%	2%	8%	41%	21% (Note: Chris Christie, Mike Huckabee, and Rand Paul with 3% each; Carly Fiorina, Jim Gilmore, and Rick Santorum with 1% each.)
NBC News/SurveyMonkey	3057	± 2.6%	January 25–31, 2016	3%	7%	20%	3%	12%	39%	17% (Note: Chris Christie and Rand Paul with 3% each, Carly Fiorina and Mike Huckabee with 2%, Rick Santorum with 1%, Jim Gilmore with 0%.)
YouGov/Economist	481	± 2.0%	January 27–30, 2016	4%	4%	18%	5%	14%	43%	12% (Note: Rand Paul with 4%, Chris Christie, Carly Fiorina, and Mike Huckabee with 2% each; Jim Gilmore and Rick Santorum with 1% each.)
IBD/TIPP	395	± 5.0%	January 22–27, 2016	5%	9%	21%	2%	10%	31%	23% (Note: Rand Paul with 4%, Carly Fiorina with 2%, Chris Christie, Mike Huckabee, and Rick Santorum with 1% each, Jim Gilmore with 0%.)
Bloomberg/Purple Strategies	1020	± 3.1%	January 22–26, 2016	7%	9%	12%	4%	14%	34%	21% (Note: Mike Huckabee and Rand Paul with 3% each, Chris Christie and Carly Fiorina with 2% each, Rick Santorum with 1%, Jim Gilmore with 0%.)
Morning Consult	1552	± 2.0%	January 21–24, 2016	7%	10%	11%	2%	9%	40%	17% (Note: Chris Christie and Mike Huckabee with 3% each, Rand Paul with 2%, Carly Fiorina and Rick Santorum with 1% each.)
CNN/ORC	405	± 3.0%	January 21–24, 2016	5%	6%	19%	1%	8%	41%	12% (Note: Chris Christie with 4%, Mike Huckabee and Rand Paul with 3% each, Carly Fiorina with 2%.)
ABC News/Washington Post	356	± 3.5%	January 21–24, 2016	5%	7%	21%	2%	11%	37%	17% (Note: Chris Christie with 4%, Carly Fiorina with 3%, Mike Huckabee with 2%, Rand Paul with 1%, Rick Santorum with 0%.)
Public Religion Research Institute	381	± 3.6%	January 20–24, 2016	5%	14%	14%	3%	9%	31%	24% (Note: Rand Paul with 3%, Chris Christie and Carly Fiorina with 2% each, Mike Huckabee with 1%.)
NBC News/SurveyMonkey	2327	± 1.3%	January 18–24, 2016	4%	8%	17%	3%	10%	39%	19% (Note: Chris Christie and Rand Paul with 3% each, Carly Fiorina with 2%, Mike Huckabee with 1%, Jim Gilmore and Rick Santorum with 0%.)
Fox News	405	± 3.0%	January 18–21, 2016	4%	8%	20%	4%	11%	34%	17% (Note: Chris Christie with 3%, Mike Huckabee and Rand Paul with 2% each, Carly Fiorina and Jim Gilmore with 1% each, Rick Santorum with <1%.)
Zogby	294	± 5.8%	January 19–20, 2016	6%	4%	13%	3%	8%	45%	21% (Note: Carly Fiorina with 3%, Chris Christie, Mike Huckabee, Rand Paul, and Rick Santorum with 2% each, Jim Gilmore with 0%.)
Ipsos/Reuters	588	± 2.8%	January 16–20, 2016	10%	11%	12%	2%	8%	36%	20% (Note: Chris Christie and Rand Paul with 4% each, Carly Fiorina with 3%, Mike Huckabee with 2%, Jim Gilmore with 1%, Rick Santorum with 0%.)
YouGov/Economist	476	± 2.9%	January 15–19, 2016	3%	7%	19%	2%	14%	38%	16% (Note: Rand Paul with 4%, Chris Christie with 3%, Carly Fiorina and Mike Huckabee with 2% each, Rick Santorum with 1%, Jim Gilmore with 0%.)
Monmouth University	385	± 5.0%	January 15–18, 2016	5%	8%	17%	3%	11%	36%	20% (Note: Chris Christie and Mike Huckabee with 3% each, Rand Paul with 2%, Carly Fiorina and Rick Santorum with 1% each, Jim Gilmore with 0%.)
Morning Consult	1635	± 2.0%	January 14–17, 2016	7%	8%	13%	2%	9%	39%	23% (Note: Chris Christie, Mike Huckabee, and Rand Paul with 3% each, Carly Fiorina with 2%, Rick Santorum with 1%.)
NBC/SurveyMonkey	3342	± 2.3%	January 11–17, 2016	4%	8%	21%	2%	11%	38%	17% (Note: Chris Christie, Carly Fiorina, and Rand Paul with 3% each, Mike Huckabee with 2%, Jim Gilmore and Rick Santorum with 0%.)
NBC News/Wall Street Journal	400	± 4.9%	January 9–13, 2016	5%	12%	20%	3%	13%	33%	14% (Note: Chris Christie with 5%, Carly Fiorina and Rand Paul with 3% each, Mike Huckabee with 1%.)
Ipsos/Reuters	575	± 2.8%	January 9–13, 2016	10%	11%	14%	2%	6%	38%	19% (Note: Chris Christie with 4%, Carly Fiorina, Mike Huckabee, and Rand Paul with 3% each, Rick Santorum with 1%, Jim Gilmore with 0%.)
YouGov/Economist	552	± 4.6%	January 9–11, 2016	5%	6%	20%	3%	11%	36%	20% (Note: Chris Christie with 4%, Carly Fiorina, Mike Huckabee, and Rand Paul with 3% each, Rick Santorum with 2%, Jim Gilmore with 0%.)
Morning Consult	878	± 2.0%	January 8–10, 2016	5%	12%	10%	2%	9%	42%	20% (Note: Chris Christie with 4%, Rand Paul with 3%, Mike Huckabee with 2%, Carly Fiorina with 1%, Rick Santorum with 0%.)
CBS News/New York Times	442	N/A	January 7–10, 2016	6%	6%	19%	2%	12%	36%	18% (Note: Mike Huckabee with 4%, Chris Christie and Carly Fiorina with 3% each, Rand Paul with 1%, Rick Santorum with 0%.)
NBC/SurveyMonkey	2825	± 1.2%	January 4–10, 2016	3%	9%	20%	2%	11%	38%	15% (Note: Chris Christie and Rand Paul with 3% each, Carly Fiorina and Mike Huckabee with 2% each, Jim Gilmore and Rick Santorum with 0%.)
IBD/TIPP	389	± 4%	January 4–8, 2016	4%	8%	18%	2%	9%	34%	21% (Note: Chris Christie with 4%, Rand Paul with 3%, Carly Fiorina with 2%, Mike Huckabee with 1%.)
Fox News	423	± 4.5%	January 4–7, 2016	4%	10%	20%	2%	13%	35%	16% (Note: Carly Fiorina with 3%, Chris Christie and Rand Paul with 2% each, Mike Huckabee with 1%, Jim Gilmore and Rick Santorum with 0%.)
Ipsos/Reuters	634	± 4.4%	January 2–6, 2016	8%	11%	14%	1%	8%	42%	16% (Note: Chris Christie and Rand Paul with 3% each, Mike Huckabee with 2%, Carly Fiorina with 1%, Jim Gilmore and Rick Santorum with 0%.)
YouGov/Economist	469	± 4%	December 31, 2015 – January 6, 2016	4%	6%	19%	4%	13%	36%	17% (Note: Rand Paul with 5%, Chris Christie with 4%, Carly Fiorina with 3%, Mike Huckabee with 2%, Rick Santorum with 1%, Jim Gilmore with 0%.)
NBC/SurveyMonkey	949	± 1.9%	December 26, 2015 – January 3, 2016	6%	9%	18%	2%	13%	35%	19% (Note: Chris Christie with 4%, Carly Fiorina with 3%, Mike Huckabee and Rand Paul with 2% each, Rick Santorum with 1%, Jim Gilmore with 0%.)

=== Polls conducted in 2015 ===
Polls in 2015

Poll source	Sample size	Margin of error	Date(s) administered	Jeb Bush	Ben Carson	Chris Christie	Ted Cruz	Carly Fiorina	Jim Gilmore	Mike Huckabee	John Kasich	George Pataki	Rand Paul	Marco Rubio	Rick Santorum	Donald Trump	Others
Ipsos/Reuters	722	± 2.5%	December 26–30, 2015	6%	12%	2%	14%	1%	0%	2%	1%	0%	3%	12%	1%	39%	Wouldn't vote 6%
Ipsos/Reuters	626	± 4.5%	December 19–23, 2015	7%	10%	3%	13%	2%	0%	3%	2%	0%	2%	9%	3%	39%	Wouldn't vote 6%

Poll source	Sample size	Margin of error	Date(s) administered	Jeb Bush	Ben Carson	Chris Christie	Ted Cruz	Carly Fiorina	Jim Gilmore	Lindsey Graham	Mike Huckabee	John Kasich	George Pataki	Rand Paul	Marco Rubio	Rick Santorum	Donald Trump	Others
YouGov/Economist	475	± 4.5%	December 18–21, 2015	5%	7%	3%	19%	3%	0%	0%	1%	3%	0%	6%	14%	1%	35%	Others 1% No Preference 2%
CNN/ORC	438	± 4.5%	December 17–21, 2015	3%	10%	5%	18%	1%	0%	1%	2%	2%	0%	4%	10%	0%	39%	Undecided/Someone Else 5%
Emerson College	415	± 3.5%	December 17–20, 2015	6%	7%	6%	21%	5%	—	0%	1%	3%	—	1%	13%	—	36%	Undecided 1% Other 1%
Quinnipiac	508	± 4.4%	December 16–20, 2015	4%	10%	6%	24%	2%	0%	0%	1%	1%	0%	2%	12%	1%	28%	Someone Else 0%Wouldn't Vote 0%DK/NA 8%
Fox News	402	± 3.0%	December 16–17, 2015	3%	9%	3%	18%	3%	0%	0%	1%	2%	0%	3%	11%	1%	39%	Other 0% Someone else 1%Don't Know 6%
Public Policy Polling	532	± 4.3%	December 16–17, 2015	7%	6%	5%	18%	4%	0%	1%	4%	2%	0%	2%	13%	1%	34%	Undecided 2%
Morning Consult	861	± 3.0%	December 16–17, 2015	7%	12%	2%	11%	2%	—	—	—	—	—	3%	9%	—	36%	Someone else 7%Don't Know 11%
Ipsos/Reuters	730	± 2.5%	December 12–16, 2015	7%	11%	3%	14%	3%	0%	1%	5%	2%	0%	3%	10%	0%	36%	Wouldn't vote 6%
Morning Consult	1530	± 2.0%	December 11–15, 2015	7%	10%	3%	9%	3%	—	1%	3%	2%	1%	3%	7%	1%	40%	Someone Else 1%Don't Know 11%
ABC/Washington Post	362	± 3.5%	December 10–13, 2015	5%	12%	4%	15%	1%	—	1%	1%	2%	0%	2%	12%	0%	38%	Other 2% None of these 2%Would not vote 0% No Opinion4%
Monmouth University	385	± 5.0%	December 10–13, 2015	3%	9%	2%	14%	2%	0%	1%	2%	3%	1%	2%	10%	0%	41%	Other 0% No One 2% Undecided 6%
NBC News/Wall Street Journal	400	± 4.9%	December 6–9, 2015	7%	11%	3%	22%	5%	—	—	3%	2%	—	2%	15%	—	27%	Other 0% None 0% Not Sure3%
Ipsos/Reuters	494	± 3.0%	December 5–9, 2015	5%	13%	4%	11%	2%	0%	2%	2%	2%	1%	1%	12%	1%	37%	Wouldn't vote 6%
YouGov/Economist	455	± 3.0%	December 4–9, 2015	5%	8%	4%	13%	2%	0%	1%	3%	2%	0%	4%	18%	1%	35%	Other 1% No Preference 2%
CBS/New York Times	431	± 6.0%	December 4–8, 2015	3%	13%	3%	16%	1%	0%	0%	3%	3%	0%	4%	9%	0%	35%	Someone Else 0% None of Them 2%Don't Know/No Answer 7%
Zogby	271	± 6.0%	December 7, 2015	7%	13%	4%	8%	3%	—	—	1%	1%	1%	1%	12%	—	38%	Not sure 10% Someone else 2%
Morning Consult	865	± 2.0%	December 3–7, 2015	5%	12%	3%	7%	2%	1%	1%	3%	2%	1%	2%	10%	0%	41%	Don't know 9% Someone else 1%
Public Religion Research Institute	376	± 3.7%	December 2–6, 2015	10%	16%	3%	10%	2%	—	—	1%	2%	—	4%	12%	0%	24%	Other 3%Don't Know/Refused 14%
Suffolk/USA Today	357	± 5.2%	December 2–6, 2015	4%	10%	2%	17%	1%	—	—	1%	2%	—	2%	16%	1%	27%	Other 1%
Ipsos/Reuters	770	± 4.0%	November 30 –December 4, 2015	10%	14%	3%	8%	3%	1%	0%	2%	2%	0%	4%	13%	0%	35%	Wouldn't vote 4%
IBD/TIPP	901	± 3.3%	November 30 –December 4, 2015	3%	15%	2%	13%	3%	0%	0%	2%	2%	0%	2%	14%	0%	27%	
Ipsos/Reuters	351	± 6.0%	November 28 –December 2, 2015	11%	17%	2%	11%	2%	0%	0%	2%	1%	0%	4%	7%	0%	36%	Wouldn't vote 6%
CNN/ORC	1020	± 3.0%	November 27 –December 1, 2015	3%	14%	4%	16%	3%	0%	0%	2%	2%	0%	1%	12%	0%	36%	Someone else 1% None 4% No opinion 2%
Quinnipiac	672	± 3.8%	November 23–30, 2015	5%	16%	2%	16%	3%	0%	0%	1%	2%	0%	2%	17%	0%	27%	Wouldn't vote 1%DK/NA 8%
Ipsos/Reuters	352	± 6.0%	November 21–25, 2015	6%	9%	4%	11%	3%	3%	0%	3%	3%	2%	2%	10%	0%	37%	Wouldn't vote 6%
YouGov/Economist	600	± 3.1%	November 19–23, 2015	6%	10%	3%	12%	4%	0%	1%	2%	4%	0%	4%	14%	0%	36%	Undecided 3%
Ipsos/Reuters	936	± 3.5%	November 20, 2015	6%	15%	3%	7%	2%	1%	1%	3%	3%	0%	4%	10%	1%	39%	Wouldn't vote 6%
Fox News	434	± 4.5%	November 16–19, 2015	5%	18%	3%	14%	3%	0%	<1%	3%	2%	1%	2%	14%	0%	28%	Other 1% None of the above 1%Don't know 5%

Poll source	Sample size	Margin of error	Date(s) administered	Jeb Bush	Ben Carson	Chris Christie	Ted Cruz	Carly Fiorina	Jim Gilmore	Lindsey Graham	Mike Huckabee	Bobby Jindal	John Kasich	George Pataki	Rand Paul	Marco Rubio	Rick Santorum	Donald Trump	Others
ABC/Washington Post	373	± 6.0%	November 16–19, 2015	6%	22%	2%	8%	4%	—	1%	3%	<1%	3%	<1%	3%	11%	1%	32%	Other 5%
Ipsos/Reuters	1299	± 3.1%	November 14–18, 2015	6%	14%	3%	8%	3%	0%	0%	3%	1%	2%	0%	5%	11%	1%	37%	Wouldn't vote 6%
Public Policy Polling	607	± 2.7%	November 16–17, 2015	5%	19%	3%	14%	4%	0%	1%	4%	0%	3%	1%	2%	13%	0%	26%	Undecided 2%
Bloomberg/Selzer	379	± 3.1%	November 15–17, 2015	6%	20%	4%	9%	3%	—	1%	3%	—	3%	1%	3%	12%	1%	24%	Not Sure 1% Uncommitted 5%
NBC/SurveyMonkey	2440	± 1.9%	November 15–17, 2015	4%	18%	3%	18%	3%	0%	0%	2%	1%	2%	0%	2%	11%	1%	28%	No Answer 1% Other 2% Undecided 6%
Morning Consult	774	± 2.0%	November 13–16, 2015	6%	19%	2%	7%	3%	—	1%	3%	0%	1%	0%	2%	7%	0%	38%	Other 2%, undecided 9%
Ipsos/Reuters	257	± 7.0%	November 13, 2015	4%	23%	1%	7%	3%	0%	1%	3%	0%	2%	0%	2%	10%	0%	42%	Wouldn't vote 1%
YouGov/UMass	318	± 6.4%	November 5–13, 2015	3%	22%	2%	13%	4%	0%	<1%	1%	1%	4%	0%	4%	9%	<1%	31%	
Rasmussen Reports	672	± 4.0%	November 11–12, 2015	8%	20%	—	13%	4%	—	—	—	—	—	—	—	16%	—	27%	Other 7% Undecided 5%
Ipsos/Reuters	555	± 4.1%	November 7–11, 2015	6%	17%	1%	10%	5%	0%	1%	4%	1%	1%	0%	3%	10%	2%	33%	Wouldn't vote 5%
Public Religion Research Institute	147	± ?%	November 6–10, 2015	8%	22%	3%	10%	2%	—	—	6%	—	3%	—	0%	9%	—	20%	Other/Don't Know 12%
YouGov/Economist	446	± 3.0%	November 5–9, 2015	3%	18%	3%	10%	3%	1%	1%	4%	2%	4%	0%	4%	13%	1%	32%	Other 0%
Morning Consult	1567	± 2.0%	November 5–8, 2015	8%	19%	2%	7%	2%	—	0%	3%	1%	1%	0%	2%	7%	1%	34%	Other 1% Undecided 11%
Ipsos/Reuters	618	± 4.5%	October 31 –November 4, 2015	10%	19%	3%	8%	5%	0%	1%	3%	1%	2%	1%	2%	10%	0%	29%	Wouldn't vote 5%
McClatchy/Marist	431	± 2.6%	October 29 –November 4, 2015	8%	24%	2%	8%	3%	0%	0%	3%	1%	4%	1%	5%	12%	1%	23%	Undecided 4%
Fox News	476	± 3.0%	November 1–3, 2015	4%	23%	2%	11%	3%	0%	0%	4%	0%	4%	0%	4%	11%	0%	26%	None of the Above/Other 1% Undecided 5%
USC/LA Times/SurveyMonkey	1292	± 3.0%	October 29 –November 3, 2015	4%	21%	1%	10%	4%	0%	0%	2%	1%	2%	0%	2%	12%	1%	25%	Other 2% Undecided 13%
Quinnipiac University	502	± 4.4%	October 29 –November 2, 2015	4%	23%	3%	13%	2%	—	—	1%	—	3%	—	2%	14%	1%	24%	Other 1% Undecided 9%
Ipsos/Reuters	635	± 4.4%	October 28 –November 2, 2015	10%	18%	3%	6%	5%	0%	0%	3%	1%	3%	0%	3%	10%	1%	31%	Wouldn't Vote 6%
Morning Consult	937	± 2.0%	October 29 –November 1, 2015	7%	21%	4%	9%	2%	—	0%	3%	1%	1%	1%	3%	7%	0%	31%	Other 1% Undecided 10%
Zogby	344	± 5.4%	October 30–31, 2015	7%	17%	2%	7%	2%	0%	1%	2%	1%	1%	0%	4%	10%	1%	30%	None of the Above/Other 1% Undecided 11%
NBC/SurveyMonkey	1226	± 1.5%	October 27–29, 2015	5%	26%	2%	10%	4%	0%	0%	2%	0%	2%	0%	2%	9%	0%	26%	No Answer/Other 1% Undecided 8%
NBC News/Wall Street Journal	400	± 4.9%	October 25–29, 2015	8%	29%	3%	10%	3%	0%	0%	3%	0%	3%	0%	2%	11%	0%	23%	None 1% Other 1% Undecided 3%
IBD	402	± 5.0%	October 24–29, 2015	6%	23%	1%	6%	3%	0%	0%	1%	2%	1%	0%	2%	11%	1%	28%	Wouldn't Vote/Undecided 15%
Ipsos/Reuters	584	± 2.7%	October 24–28, 2015	9%	27%	3%	5%	4%	0%	1%	2%	1%	4%	1%	3%	6%	0%	29%	Wouldn't Vote 6%
YouGov/Economist	407	± 3%	October 23–27, 2015	8%	18%	2%	8%	3%	0%	1%	2%	1%	4%	0%	4%	11%	1%	32%	Other 0% Undecided 3%
Morning Consult	714	± 2.0%	October 22–25, 2015	8%	20%	3%	3%	3%	0%	0%	4%	2%	2%	1%	3%	6%	1%	35%	Other 1% Undecided 10%
CBS News/New York Times	575	± 6%	October 21–25, 2015	7%	26%	1%	4%	7%	0%	2%	4%	0%	4%	0%	4%	8%	1%	22%	Someone Else <1% None of them 3%Don't know/No answer 6%
Ipsos/Reuters	806	± 3.9%	October 17–21, 2015	9%	18%	3%	5%	6%	0%	1%	4%	2%	4%	1%	3%	6%	1%	31%	Wouldn't vote 8%
Morning Consult	770	± 2.0%	October 15–19, 2015	6%	14%	4%	5%	3%	—	1%	3%	1%	2%	1%	2%	5%	1%	40%	Other 2% Undecided 12%
Monmouth University	348	± 5.3%	October 15–18, 2015	5%	18%	3%	10%	6%	0%	1%	4%	1%	1%	0%	4%	6%	0%	28%	No one 3% Undecided 9%
ABC News/Washington Post	364	± 6.0%	October 15–18, 2015	7%	22%	3%	6%	5%	—	1%	3%	0%	2%	1%	2%	10%	0%	32%	Other 1% None of these 1% No opinion 0%Would not vote 2%
Emerson College	403	± 4.8%	October 16–17, 2015	8%	23%	2%	6%	6%	—	—	4%	—	3%	—	0%	14%	0%	32%	Other 0% Undecided 2%
NBC News/Wall Street Journal	400	± 4.9%	October 15–18, 2015	8%	22%	1%	9%	7%	0%	0%	3%	0%	3%	0%	2%	13%	0%	25%	Other 1% Undecided 5% None 1%
CNN/ORC	465	± 4.5%	October 14–17, 2015	8%	22%	4%	4%	4%	0%	1%	5%	0%	3%	0%	5%	8%	2%	27%	Other 1% Undecided 4% None 2%
NBC News/SurveyMonkey	1881	± 2.0%	October 13–15, 2015	5%	23%	2%	6%	6%	0%	0%	3%	1%	3%	0%	2%	9%	0%	28%	No Answer 2% Other 2% Undecided 7%
Ipsos/Reuters	492	± 3.0%	October 10–14, 2015	11%	19%	3%	4%	3%	1%	0%	3%	1%	2%	0%	4%	8%	1%	33%	Wouldn't Vote 7%
Fox News	398	± 5%	October 10–12, 2015	8%	23%	1%	10%	5%	0%	0%	5%	1%	1%	1%	3%	9%	0%	24%	Other 1% None of the above 1%Don't know 7%
YouGov/Economist	434	± 2.8%	October 8–12, 2015	7%	18%	3%	8%	9%	0%	1%	3%	1%	3%	0%	3%	11%	0%	28%	Other 0% No preference 3%
Morning Consult	749	± 3.58%	October 8–12, 2015	9%	20%	2%	5%	5%	—	1%	4%	0%	3%	1%	3%	5%	1%	34%	Other/Undecided 8%
CBS News	419	± 5%	October 4–8, 2015	6%	21%	3%	9%	6%	—	—	2%	0%	2%	0%	4%	8%	1%	27%	Don't know 11%
Ipsos/Reuters	602	± ?%	October 3–7, 2015	14%	17%	3%	4%	7%	0%	0%	4%	0%	1%	0%	4%	7%	0%	31%	Wouldn't vote 7%
Morning Consult	807RV	± 3.45%	October 2–5, 2015	7%	13%	4%	5%	6%	—	1%	2%	0%	4%	1%	3%	10%	1%	31%	Other 2% Undecided 10%
Fairleigh Dickinson University	824RV	± 4.1%	October 1–5, 2015	7%	22%	3%	5%	7%	0%	—	6%	1%	1%	0%	4%	8%	—	26%	Other 1%Would not vote 1%Don't know 8%
Public Policy Polling	627RV	± 3.9%	October 1–4, 2015	10%	17%	2%	7%	6%	0%	1%	4%	1%	4%	1%	2%	13%	2%	27%	Undecided 3%
Gravis Marketing/One America News	898RV	± 3.3%	September 30 –October 1, 2015	7%	17%	2%	7%	9%	—	0%	5%	0%	3%	0%	3%	11%	1%	35%	
IBD/TIPP	377RV	± 5.0%	September 26 –October 1, 2015	8%	24%	2%	6%	9%	0%	0%	2%	1%	4%	0%	3%	11%	0%	17%	Undecided 9%
Ipsos/Reuters	481	± 3.1%	September 26–30, 2015	10%	12%	5%	5%	8%	1%	0%	3%	1%	1%	0%	7%	7%	2%	32%	Wouldn't vote 6%
Suffolk/USA Today	380LV	5.03%	September 24–28, 2015	8%	13%	1%	6%	13%	—	1%	2%	1%	2%	0%	2%	9%	0%	23%	Other 1% Undecided 18%
Morning Consult	637RV	± 3.9%	September 24–27, 2015	10%	15%	4%	5%	9%	—	0%	3%	0%	1%	1%	3%	9%	1%	30%	Undecided 9%
NBC News/Wall Street Journal	230LV	± 6.5%	September 20–24, 2015	7%	20%	3%	5%	11%	0%	0%	2%	1%	6%	0%	3%	11%	1%	21%	Other 1% None 2% Not Sure 6%
Ipsos/Reuters	572	± 4.7%	September 19–23, 2015	10%	18%	3%	5%	8%	2%	1%	3%	1%	3%	0%	2%	6%	1%	30%	Scott Walker 2%Wouldn't vote 5%
Fox News	398LV	± 4.5%	September 20–22, 2015	7%	18%	5%	8%	9%	0%	0%	3%	0%	4%	1%	2%	9%	0%	26%	Other 3% None of the above 1%Don't know 4%
Quinnipiac	737RV	± 3.6%	September 17–21, 2015	10%	17%	2%	7%	12%	0%	0%	2%	0%	2%	1%	1%	9%	0%	25%	Don't know 9% Someone else 1%Wouldn't vote 4%

Poll source	Sample size	Margin of error	Date(s) administered	Jeb Bush	Ben Carson	Chris Christie	Ted Cruz	Carly Fiorina	Jim Gilmore	Lindsey Graham	Mike Huckabee	Bobby Jindal	John Kasich	George Pataki	Rand Paul	Marco Rubio	Rick Santorum	Donald Trump	Scott Walker	Others
Bloomberg/Selzer	391RV	± 5%	September 18–21, 2015	13%	16%	4%	5%	11%	0%	0%	3%	1%	4%	0%	2%	8%	1%	21%	1%	Uncommitted 5% Not sure 5%
Zogby	405LV	± 5%	September 18–19, 2015	9%	13%	3%	5%	7%	0%	0%	2%	0%	4%	0%	4%	4%	0%	33%	2%	
CNN/ORC	444RV	± 4.5%	September 17–19, 2015	9%	14%	3%	6%	15%	0%	0%	6%	0%	2%	0%	4%	11%	1%	24%	0%	No one 1% No opinion 3% Someone else 0%
NBC News/Survey Monkey	5,113	± 2%	September 16–18, 2015	8%	14%	3%	7%	11%	0%	0%	2%	0%	2%	1%	3%	7%	0%	29%	3%	No one 1%Don't know 6% Someone else 2%
Gravis Marketing/One America News	1,377	± 3%	September 17, 2015	6%	12%	4%	6%	22%	0%	0%	2%	0%	4%	0%	2%	15%	1%	22%	3%	
Ipsos/Reuters	532	± 4.8%	September 12–16, 2015	8%	14%	6%	5%	2%	0%	0%	7%	1%	2%	0%	2%	3%	1%	35%	4%	Wouldn't vote 8%

Poll source	Sample size	Margin of error	Date(s) administered	Jeb Bush	Ben Carson	Chris Christie	Ted Cruz	Carly Fiorina	Jim Gilmore	Lindsey Graham	Mike Huckabee	Bobby Jindal	John Kasich	George Pataki	Rand Paul	Rick Perry	Marco Rubio	Rick Santorum	Donald Trump	Scott Walker	Others
The Economist/YouGov	436	± 2.8%	September 11–15, 2015	7%	17%	2%	8%	6%	0%	1%	2%	0%	3%	1%	4%	0%	7%	1%	33%	5%	Other 0% Undecided 4%
Morning Consult	756	± 2.0%	September 11–13, 2015	9%	17%	2%	6%	3%	—	0%	3%	1%	2%	2%	5%	—	3%	1%	33%	2%	Other 1% Undecided 10%
CBS News	376	± 6%	September 9–13, 2015	6%	23%	1%	5%	4%	0%	0%	6%	0%	3%	0%	3%	1%	6%	1%	27%	2%	None of these 4% Other 0% No opinion 9%
ABC News/Washington Post	342	± ?%	September 7–10, 2015	8%	20%	1%	7%	2%	0%	0%	3%	1%	3%	0%	5%	1%	7%	1%	33%	2%	Wouldn't vote 1% None of these 1% Other 1% No opinion 3%
Ipsos/Reuters	469	± 5.1%	September 5–9, 2015	8%	12%	3%	6%	2%	0%	1%	5%	2%	3%	0%	3%	2%	4%	2%	35%	6%	Wouldn't vote 8%
Emerson College	409	± 4.9%	September 5–8, 2015	12%	20%	1%	6%	3%	—	0%	4%	—	4%	—	1%	0%	8%	—	34%	5%	Other 1% Undecided 2%
CNN/ORC	474	± 4.5%	September 4–8, 2015	9%	19%	2%	7%	3%	0%	1%	5%	1%	2%	0%	3%	0%	3%	1%	32%	5%	Other 3% No one 2% Undecided 2%
Morning Consult	722	± 3.5%	September 4–7, 2015	9%	18%	4%	5%	3%	—	1%	4%	1%	2%	0%	2%	3%	4%	1%	31%	4%	Undecided 9%
Monmouth University	366	± 5.1%	August 31 – September 2, 2015	8%	18%	2%	8%	4%	0%	0%	4%	0%	2%	0%	2%	1%	5%	0%	30%	3%	Other 0% No one 2% Undecided 9%
Morning Consult	769	± 2.0%	August 28–30, 2015	9%	9%	3%	4%	3%	—	0%	6%	1%	2%	0%	1%	4%	6%	2%	37%	5%	Other 1% Undecided 8%
Public Policy Polling	572	± 4.2%	August 28–30, 2015	9%	15%	2%	6%	8%	1%	0%	5%	0%	6%	0%	1%	1%	7%	2%	29%	5%	Undecided 1%
Ipsos/Reuters	412	± 5.5%	August 22–26, 2015	7%	8%	2%	5%	5%	1%	1%	10%	1%	1%	0%	5%	3%	5%	1%	30%	5%	Wouldn't vote 10%
Hot Air/Townhall/Survey Monkey	959	± ?%	?	8%	8%	2%	3%	5%	0%	1%	2%	1%	5%	1%	3%	1%	5%	1%	24%	1%	Undecided/Not sure 30.3%
Quinnipiac	666	± 3.8%	August 20–25, 2015	7%	12%	4%	7%	5%	0%	0%	3%	0%	5%	0%	2%	1%	7%	1%	28%	6%	Other 1%Don't know 11%Wouldn't vote 0%
Ipsos/Reuters	294	± 6.5%	August 15–19, 2015	10%	9%	4%	4%	5%	—	1%	7%	2%	2%	0%	5%	4%	4%	1%	29%	9%	Wouldn't vote: 5%
Civis Analytics	757	± 4.2%	August 10–19, 2015	9%	11%	2%	7%	3%	0%	0%	7%	0%	3%	0%	3%	2%	7%	1%	16%	5%	Undecided: 24%
The Economist/YouGov	451	± 2.8%	August 14–18, 2015	9%	11%	3%	7%	6%	1%	0%	3%	1%	4%	0%	0%	3%	9%	1%	25%	9%	Other 1% Undecided 7%
Morning Consult	783	± 2.0%	August 14–16, 2015	12%	7%	4%	5%	4%	—	1%	6%	1%	3%	0%	4%	2%	6%	1%	32%	3%	Other 0% Undecided 11%
CNN/ORC	506	± 4.5%	August 13–16, 2015	13%	8%	4%	5%	5%	0%	0%	4%	0%	5%	0%	6%	2%	7%	1%	24%	7%	Someone else 4% None/No One 5% No opinion 1%
Fox News	381	± ?%	August 11–13, 2015	9%	12%	3%	10%	5%	0%	0%	6%	1%	4%	1%	3%	1%	4%	1%	25%	6%	Other 0% None of the above 2%Don't know 7%
Ipsos/Reuters	451	± 5.2%	August 8–12, 2015	12%	8%	3%	5%	6%	—	2%	7%	2%	1%	1%	6%	2%	8%	1%	21%	5%	Wouldn't vote: 10%
Rasmussen	651	± 4.0%	August 9–10, 2015	10%	8%	4%	7%	9%	1%	1%	3%	1%	4%	0%	4%	1%	10%	1%	17%	9%	Undecided 11%
Ipsos/Reuters	278	± 6.7%	August 6–10, 2015	12%	8%	1%	5%	6%	—	3%	8%	1%	4%	0%	3%	1%	8%	1%	24%	7%	Wouldn't vote 8%
Morning Consult	746	± 2.0%	August 7–9, 2015	11%	9%	4%	4%	3%	—	1%	4%	1%	3%	0%	5%	1%	6%	1%	32%	6%	Other 1% Undecided 8%
NBC News/Survey Monkey	1591	± 3.4%	August 7–8, 2015	7%	11%	1%	13%	8%	—	1%	5%	1%	2%	0%	5%	2%	8%	0%	23%	7%	
Ipsos/Reuters	341	± 6.0%	August 1–5, 2015	16%	5%	3%	6%	1%	—	3%	5%	1%	3%	0%	7%	4%	4%	2%	24%	12%	Wouldn't vote 6%
Zogby/University of Akron	565	± 4.2%	August 3–4, 2015	17%	6%	2%	6%	2%	0%	0%	5%	1%	1%	2%	5%	2%	4%	1%	25%	9%	Not Sure/Someone Else 12%
The Economist/YouGov	424	± ?%	July 31 –August 4, 2015	12%	6%	4%	6%	2%	0%	1%	3%	3%	1%	0%	6%	2%	8%	0%	26%	14%	Other 0% No preference 4%
Morning Consult	783	± 2%	July 31 –August 3, 2015	12%	7%	3%	7%	1%	—	0%	5%	3%	2%	1%	3%	5%	6%	2%	25%	8%	Undecided 10%
Fox News	475	± ?%	July 30 –August 2, 2015	15%	7%	3%	6%	2%	0%	0%	6%	1%	3%	0%	5%	1%	5%	2%	26%	9%	Other 1% None of the above 1%Don't know 7%
Bloomberg	500	± 4.4%	July 30 –August 2, 2015	10%	5%	4%	4%	1%	0%	1%	7%	1%	4%	0%	5%	2%	6%	2%	21%	8%	Uncommitted 6% Not sure 12%
Monmouth University	423	± 4.8%	July 30 –August 2, 2015	12%	5%	4%	6%	2%	0%	1%	6%	1%	3%	0%	4%	2%	4%	1%	26%	11%	Undecided/No one 11%
CBS News	408	± ?%	July 29 –August 2, 2015	13%	6%	3%	6%	0%	1%	0%	8%	2%	1%	1%	4%	2%	6%	1%	24%	10%	Someone Else 1% None of them 3%Don't know/No answer 9%
Wall Street Journal/NBC News	252	± 6.17%	July 26–30, 2015	14%	10%	3%	9%	0%	0%	0%	6%	1%	3%	0%	6%	3%	5%	1%	19%	15%	
Gravis Marketing/One America News	732	± 3.7%	July 29, 2015	13%	6%	3%	6%	2%	—	1%	6%	0%	5%	0%	4%	3%	5%	2%	31%	13%	
Rasmussen Reports	471	± 5%	July 28–29, 2015	10%	5%	2%	7%	1%	—	1%	7%	2%	5%	1%	3%	2%	5%	2%	26%	14%	Not Sure 7%
Ipsos/Reuters	409	± 5.5%	July 25–29, 2015	11%	6%	4%	3%	2%	—	2%	5%	2%	4%	2%	7%	3%	5%	2%	27%	7%	Wouldn't vote 8%
Emerson College	476	± 4.6%	July 26–28, 2015	15%	5%	2%	8%	3%	—	0%	6%	0%	2%	0%	4%	0%	4%	1%	31%	13%	Other 0% Undecided 7%
Quinnipiac	710	± 3.7%	July 23–28, 2015	10%	6%	3%	5%	1%	0%	1%	6%	2%	5%	1%	6%	2%	6%	1%	20%	13%	Someone else 0%Wouldn't vote 1%DK/NA 12%
CNN/ORC	419	± 4.5%	July 22–25, 2015	15%	4%	4%	7%	1%	0%	1%	5%	2%	4%	1%	6%	3%	6%	2%	18%	10%	Someone else 4% None/No One 4% No Opinion 3%
Reuters/Ipsos	359	± 5.9%	July 18–22, 2015	18%	6%	6%	6%	1%	—	2%	4%	2%	3%	1%	4%	5%	2%	3%	17%	10%	Wouldn't vote 10%
Public Policy Polling	524	± 3.0%	July 20–21, 2015	12%	10%	3%	4%	4%	0%	0%	8%	1%	3%	0%	4%	1%	10%	1%	19%	17%	Undecided 2%

Poll source	Sample size	Margin of error	Date(s) administered	Jeb Bush	Ben Carson	Chris Christie	Ted Cruz	Carly Fiorina	Lindsey Graham	Mike Huckabee	Bobby Jindal	John Kasich	George Pataki	Rand Paul	Rick Perry	Marco Rubio	Rick Santorum	Donald Trump	Scott Walker	Others
The Economist/YouGov	228	± ?%	July 18–20, 2015	14%	7%	4%	3%	3%	2%	3%	1%	2%	0%	5%	2%	4%	1%	28%	13%	Other 0% Undecided 8%
Morning Consult	754	± ?%	July 18–20, 2015	15%	8%	4%	4%	2%	—	7%	—	—	—	5%	—	6%	—	22%	12%	Someone Else 3%Don't Know 12%
ABC/Washington Post	341	± 3.5%	July 16–19, 2015	12%	6%	3%	4%	0%	0%	8%	2%	2%	1%	6%	4%	7%	1%	24%	13%	Other 0% None of these 4%Would not vote 1% No opinion 2%
Fox News	389	± 4.5%	July 13–15, 2015	14%	6%	3%	4%	1%	0%	4%	0%	2%	0%	8%	1%	7%	2%	18%	15%	Other 1% None of the above 4%Don't know 9%
Reuters/Ipsos	301	± 6.4%	July 11–15, 2015	13%	7%	7%	4%	1%	2%	8%	4%	2%	2%	5%	3%	5%	0%	22%	7%	Wouldn't vote 8%
Suffolk University/USA Today	349	± 5.25%	July 9–12, 2015	14%	4%	3%	6%	1%	0%	4%	1%	1%	0%	4%	1%	5%	1%	17%	8%	Other 1%Undecided 30%
Monmouth University	336	± 5.4%	July 9–12, 2015	15%	6%	2%	9%	1%	0%	7%	2%	1%	0%	6%	2%	6%	2%	13%	7%	Jim Gilmore 0% Other 0% No one 1%Undecided 18%
Reuters/Ipsos	450	± 5.2%	July 4–8, 2015	16%	9%	8%	7%	1%	2%	6%	2%	2%	1%	7%	4%	4%	0%	14%	10%	Wouldn't vote 8%
The Economist/YouGov	226	± 4%	July 4–6, 2015	11%	7%	6%	4%	3%	0%	9%	2%	2%	0%	11%	3%	9%	2%	15%	9%	Other 0% No preference 5%
Reuters/Ipsos	478	± 5.0%	June 27 –July 1, 2015	16%	9%	5%	6%	2%	1%	6%	4%	0%	2%	8%	4%	6%	1%	15%	7%	Wouldn't vote 9%
The Economist/YouGov	246	± 4%	June 27–29, 2015	14%	9%	3%	4%	6%	2%	6%	3%	2%	0%	11%	2%	10%	1%	11%	12%	Other 1% No preference 5%
CNN/ORC International	407	± 5.0%	June 26–28, 2015	19%	7%	3%	3%	1%	1%	8%	2%	2%	0%	7%	4%	6%	3%	12%	6%	Other 7% None of the above 6% Undecided 3%
Fox News	378	± 3.0%	June 21–23, 2015	15%	10%	2%	4%	3%	1%	6%	2%	2%	1%	9%	2%	8%	3%	11%	9%	Other 0% None of the above 3% Undecided 9%
The Economist/YouGov	235	± 4.2%	June 20–22, 2015	10%	10%	2%	9%	3%	2%	6%	0%	2%	0%	11%	2%	11%	2%	11%	10%	Other 1% No preference 8%
NBC News/Wall Street Journal	236	± 6.38%	June 14–18, 2015	22%	11%	4%	4%	2%	1%	9%	0%	1%	0%	7%	5%	14%	0%	1%	17%	None 0% Other 1% Not Sure 1%
The Economist/YouGov	233	± 4.4%	June 13–15, 2015	14%	9%	4%	3%	6%	0%	7%	1%	4%	0%	9%	7%	10%	3%	2%	9%	Other 1% No preference 11%
Public Policy Polling	492	± 2.9%	June 11–14, 2015	15%	12%	4%	8%	5%	—	12%	—	—	—	8%	—	13%	—	—	17%	Someone else/Undecided 9%
Monmouth University	351	± 5.2%	June 11–14, 2015	9%	11%	4%	5%	2%	2%	8%	1%	1%	0%	6%	4%	9%	3%	2%	10%	Other 0% No one 2%Undecided 20%
Reuters/Ipsos	676	± 4.3%	June 6–10, 2015	12%	10%	7%	8%	2%	3%	12%	—	—	3%	8%	—	8%	5%	4%	10%	Wouldn't vote 9%
The Economist/YouGov	238	± 4.7%	June 6–8, 2015	8%	10%	5%	7%	7%	5%	7%	1%	2%	0%	9%	2%	10%	4%	—	7%	Other 2%No preference 14%
Fox News	370	± 5%	May 31 –June 2, 2015	12%	11%	5%	8%	2%	2%	6%	1%	2%	2%	9%	4%	7%	2%	4%	12%	Other 1% None of the above 2%Don't know 10%
The Economist/YouGov	255	± 4.4%	May 30 –June 1, 2015	15%	6%	2%	7%	5%	1%	9%	1%	3%	0%	10%	2%	8%	3%	—	12%	Other 2% No preference 14%
CNN/ORC	483	4.5%	May 29–31, 2015	13%	7%	4%	8%	1%	1%	10%	1%	1%	3%	8%	5%	14%	2%	3%	10%	Someone else 5% None/No one 2% No opinion 1%
ABC/Washington Post	362	± 6.0%	May 28–31, 2015	10%	8%	6%	8%	2%	1%	9%	0%	3%	1%	11%	2%	10%	4%	4%	11%	Other 0% None of these 2%Would not vote 1% No opinion 5%

Poll source	Sample size	Margin of error	Date(s) administered	Jeb Bush	Ben Carson	Chris Christie	Ted Cruz	Carly Fiorina	Lindsey Graham	Mike Huckabee	Bobby Jindal	John Kasich	Rand Paul	Rick Perry	Marco Rubio	Rick Santorum	Scott Walker	Others
The Economist/YouGov	209	± 3.9%	May 23–25, 2015	10%	12%	3%	6%	2%	1%	10%	2%	1%	9%	4%	16%	0%	13%	Other 3% No preference 7%
Quinnipiac	679	± 3.8%	May 19–26, 2015	10%	10%	4%	6%	2%	1%	10%	1%	2%	7%	1%	10%	—	10%	Donald Trump 5%Wouldn't vote 1%DK/NA 20%
The Economist/YouGov	229	± 4.1%	May 16–18, 2015	7%	11%	7%	4%	2%	1%	9%	1%	4%	10%	2%	12%	1%	17%	Other 2% No preference 11%
Fox News	413	± 4.5%	May 9–12, 2015	13%	13%	6%	6%	1%	0%	10%	1%	2%	7%	2%	9%	2%	11%	Donald Trump 4% George Pataki 0% Other 1% None 3% Not sure 10%
The Economist/YouGov	246	± 4.6%	May 9–11, 2015	10%	9%	3%	8%	4%	1%	11%	1%	1%	6%	1%	17%	2%	14%	Other 4% No preference 9%
Public Policy Polling	685	± 3.7%	May 7–10, 2015	11%	12%	5%	10%	—	—	12%	—	—	9%	2%	13%	—	18%	Someone else/Not sure 7%
The Economist/YouGov	218	± 4.2%	May 2–4, 2015	14%	4%	7%	7%	0%	0%	7%	0%	5%	9%	6%	11%	1%	16%	Other 3% No preference 9%
NBC News/Wall Street Journal	251	± 6.19%	April 26–30, 2015	23%	7%	5%	11%	1%	—	5%	—	—	11%	2%	18%	—	14%	Other 0% None 0% Not sure 3%
The Economist/YouGov	233	± 4.1%	April 25–27, 2015	9%	5%	5%	7%	2%	2%	6%	2%	2%	8%	2%	17%	1%	19%	Other 2% No preference 9%
Fox News	383	± 5%	April 19–21, 2015	9%	6%	6%	8%	0%	1%	9%	1%	2%	10%	2%	13%	1%	12%	Donald Trump 5% George Pataki 1% Other 1% None 3%Don't know 9%
Quinnipiac University	567	± 4.1%	April 16–21, 2015	13%	3%	7%	9%	1%	2%	7%	1%	2%	8%	3%	15%	2%	11%	Other 1%Wouldn't vote 1%Don't know 14%
The Economist/YouGov	228	± 4.1%	April 18–20, 2015	13%	10%	6%	11%	1%	0%	5%	2%	1%	11%	2%	9%	1%	15%	Other 3% No preference 10%
CNN/ORC	435	± 4.5%	April 16–19, 2015	17%	4%	4%	7%	2%	2%	9%	2%	2%	11%	3%	11%	3%	12%	George Pataki 0% Other 5% None/No one 5% No opinion 2%
The Economist/YouGov	228	± 4.1%	April 11–13, 2015	12%	7%	4%	13%	3%	2%	4%	1%	2%	13%	4%	7%	2%	14%	Other 2% No preference 12%
Monmouth University	355	± 5.2%	March 30 –April 2, 2015	13%	7%	5%	11%	1%	1%	9%	1%	1%	6%	5%	5%	1%	11%	Donald Trump 7%George Pataki 0%John R. Bolton 0%Other 1% No one 2% Undecided 12%
Fox News	379	± 5%	March 29–31, 2015	12%	11%	4%	10%	1%	0%	10%	2%	1%	9%	3%	8%	2%	15%	Donald Trump 3%George Pataki 1% Other 1% None 4%Don't know 6%
ABC News/Washington Post	443	± 4.7%	March 26–31, 2015	21%	6%	7%	12%	1%	1%	8%	1%	1%	8%	1%	8%	2%	13%	Other/None of these/Wouldn't vote/No opinion 12%
Public Policy Polling	443	± 4.7%	March 26–31, 2015	17%	10%	4%	16%	—	—	6%	—	—	10%	3%	6%	—	20%	Undecided 8%
The Economist/YouGov	235	± 4.3%	March 21–23, 2015	14%	10%	6%	8%	3%	1%	5%	2%	2%	5%	5%	5%	1%	19%	Other 2% No preference 11%
CNN/ORC	450	± 4.5%	March 13–15, 2015	16%	9%	7%	4%	0%	1%	10%	1%	2%	12%	4%	7%	1%	13%	Other 4% None/No one 6% No opinion 3%
McClatchy-Marist	426	± 4.7%	March 1–4, 2015	19%	9%	6%	4%	2%	1%	10%	—	—	7%	3%	5%	2%	18%	Undecided 13%
Quinnipiac University	554	± 4.2%	February 22 –March 2, 2015	16%	7%	8%	6%	—	1%	8%	2%	1%	6%	1%	5%	2%	18%	Other 1% Wouldn't vote 2% Undecided 17%
The Economist/YouGov	255	± 4.6%	February 21–23, 2015	13%	8%	9%	6%	—	—	7%	3%	1%	9%	3%	5%	2%	10%	Others/No preference 26%
Public Policy Polling	316	± 5.5%	February 20–22, 2015	17%	18%	5%	5%	—	—	10%	—	—	4%	3%	3%	—	25%	Other/Undecided 11%
CNN/ORC	436	± 4.5%	February 12–15, 2015	12%	9%	7%	3%	1%	1%	17%	1%	2%	11%	2%	6%	2%	11%	Other 3% None/No one 7% No opinion 3%

Poll source	Sample size	Margin of error	Date(s) administered	Jeb Bush	Ben Carson	Chris Christie	Ted Cruz	Lindsey Graham	Mike Huckabee	Bobby Jindal	John Kasich	Rand Paul	Rick Perry	Mitt Romney	Marco Rubio	Rick Santorum	Scott Walker	Others
Fox News	394	± 4.5%	January 25–27, 2015	10%	9%	4%	4%	1%	11%	2%	1%	11%	4%	21%	5%	1%	8%	Other 1% None 4% Undecided 5%
Public Policy Polling	400	± 4.9%	January 22–25, 2015	17%	15%	7%	9%	—	9%	—	—	4%	2%	21%	—	—	11%	Other/Undecided 5%
Rasmussen Reports	787	± 3.5%	January 18–19, 2015	13%	12%	7%	—	—	—	—	—	7%	5%	24%	5%	—	11%	Other 4% Undecided 12%
The Economist/YouGov	212	± ?	January 10–12, 2015	12%	10%	3%	9%	0%	8%	—	—	8%	2%	28%	2%	—	6%	Paul Ryan 3% Other 3% No preference 6%

=== Polls conducted in 2014 ===
Polls in 2014

Poll source	Sample size	Margin of error	Date(s) administered	Jeb Bush	Ben Carson	Chris Christie	Ted Cruz	Mike Huckabee	Bobby Jindal	John Kasich	Rand Paul	Rick Perry	Mitt Romney	Marco Rubio	Paul Ryan	Rick Santorum	Scott Walker	Others
CNN/ORC	453	± 4.5%	December 18–21, 2014	23%	7%	13%	4%	6%	4%	3%	6%	4%	—	5%	5%	2%	4%	Mike Pence 0%Rob Portman 0%Other 5%None/No one 5%No opinion 3%
ABC News/Washington Post	410	± 5.5%	December 11–14, 2014	10%	7%	6%	6%	6%	2%	2%	9%	4%	21%	4%	8%	3%	5%	Other 0%None 2%Wouldn't vote 0%No opinion 6%
ABC News/Washington Post	410	± 5.5%	December 11–14, 2014	14%	8%	7%	8%	7%	3%	2%	10%	5%	—	7%	11%	3%	7%	Other 0%None 2%Wouldn't vote 0%No opinion 6%
Fox News	409	± 5%	December 7–9, 2014	10%	6%	8%	5%	8%	1%	2%	8%	2%	19%	4%	6%	1%	7%	None 2%Undecided 8%
McClatchy-Marist	360	± 5.2%	December 3–9, 2014	14%	8%	9%	4%	9%	1%	2%	5%	4%	19%	3%	3%	3%	3%	Carly Fiorina 1%Undecided 13%
McClatchy-Marist	360	± 5.2%	December 3–9, 2014	16%	8%	10%	5%	12%	1%	3%	6%	5%	—	3%	7%	3%	3%	Carly Fiorina 1%Undecided 18%
CNN/ORC	510	± 4.5%	November 21–23, 2014	9%	10%	8%	5%	7%	1%	2%	6%	4%	20%	3%	6%	2%	5%	Mike Pence 1%Rob Portman 0%Other 6%None/No one 2%Undecided 3%
CNN/ORC	510	± 4.5%	November 21–23, 2014	14%	11%	9%	7%	10%	1%	3%	8%	5%	—	3%	9%	2%	5%	Mike Pence 1%Rob Portman 0%Other 6%None/No one 2%Undecided 4%
Quinnipiac University	707	± 3.7%	November 18–23, 2014	11%	8%	8%	5%	5%	2%	2%	6%	2%	19%	2%	5%	1%	5%	Rob Portman 0%Other 1%Wouldn't vote 1%Undecided 16%
Quinnipiac University	707	± 3.7%	November 18–23, 2014	14%	9%	11%	5%	7%	3%	2%	8%	3%	—	3%	7%	2%	6%	Rob Portman 1%Other 1%Wouldn't vote 1%Undecided 16%
Rasmussen Reports	?	± ?	November 20–21, 2014	18%	—	15%	—	—	—	—	13%	—	—	—	20%	—	20%	Other/Undecided 14%
ABC News/Washington Post	?	± ?	October 9–12, 2014	10%	6%	8%	3%	10%	1%	1%	9%	5%	21%	6%	5%	4%	1%	Other 1%None 2%No opinion 6%
ABC News/Washington Post	?	± ?	October 9–12, 2014	13%	7%	8%	4%	12%	2%	2%	12%	6%	—	8%	9%	4%	2%	Other 1%None 3%No opinion 9%
McClatchy-Marist	376	± 5.1%	September 24–29, 2014	15%	—	12%	4%	—	4%	—	13%	7%	—	6%	13%	3%	3%	Undecided 21%
Zogby Analytics	212	± 6.9%	September 3–4, 2014	10%	—	9%	5%	9%	—	—	15%	5%	15%	3%	5%	1%	2%	Susana Martinez 0%Nikki Haley 0%Rob Portman 0%Not sure 19%

Poll source	Sample size	Margin of error	Date(s) administered	Jeb Bush	Chris Christie	Ted Cruz	Mike Huckabee	Bobby Jindal	John Kasich	Rand Paul	Rick Perry	Marco Rubio	Paul Ryan	Rick Santorum	Scott Walker	Others
McClatchy-Marist	342	± 5.3%	August 4–7, 2014	13%	13%	10%	—	2%	—	7%	7%	9%	9%	3%	4%	Undecided 23%
Fox News	358	± 5%	July 20–22, 2014	12%	10%	9%	—	4%	2%	11%	12%	9%	9%	3%	4%	Other 2%None 4%Don't know 6%
CNN/ORC	470	± 4.5%	July 18–20, 2014	8%	13%	8%	12%	—	—	12%	11%	6%	11%	3%	5%	Other 6%None/No one 2%No opinion 3%
Zogby Analytics	282	± 6%	June 27–29, 2014	13%	13%	—	—	4%	1%	20%	—	7%	—	—	8%	Nikki Haley 1%Susana Martinez 1%
Quinnipiac	620	± 2.6%	June 24–30, 2014	10%	10%	8%	10%	1%	2%	11%	3%	6%	8%	2%	8%	Wouldn't vote 2%Don't know 20%
Saint Leo University	225	± ?	May 28 – June 4, 2014	16%	11%	8%	6%	1%	2%	3%	5%	4%	6%	2%	2%	Ben Carson 6%Peter T. King 3%John R. Bolton 1%Rob Portman 1%Other 2%Don't know/Not sure 19%
CNN/ORC	452	± 4.5%	May 29 – June 1, 2014	12%	8%	9%	11%	—	—	14%	6%	8%	10%	4%	5%	Other 6%None/No one 2%No opinion 5%
CNN/ORC	473	± 4.5%	May 2–4, 2014	13%	9%	7%	10%	—	—	13%	8%	6%	12%	2%	7%	Other 4%None/No one 4%No opinion 7%
Washington Post-ABC News	424	± 5%	April 25–27, 2014	14%	10%	6%	13%	1%	2%	14%	6%	7%	11%	—	5%	Other 1%None of these 4%No opinion 5%
Fox News	384	± 5%	April 13–15, 2014	14%	15%	7%	—	2%	—	14%	5%	8%	9%	5%	5%	Other 1%None 6%Don't know 9%
McClatchy-Marist	416	± 4.8%	April 7–10, 2014	13%	12%	4%	13%	4%	<1%	12%	3%	7%	12%	3%	5%	Other/Undecided 14%
WPA Research	801	± ?	March 18–20, 2014	11%	9%	9%	13%	3%	—	13%	1%	6%	6%	3%	5%	Other/Undecided 21%
CNN/ORC	801	± 5%	March 7–9, 2014	9%	8%	8%	10%	—	—	16%	11%	5%	15%	3%	—	Other 6%None/No one 4%No opinion 5%
Public Policy Polling	542	± 4.2%	March 6–9, 2014	15%	14%	11%	18%	4%	—	14%	—	6%	5%	—	5%	Other/Not Sure 9%
Public Policy Polling	542	± 4.2%	March 6–9, 2014	21%	14%	13%	—	5%	—	15%	—	8%	9%	—	5%	Other/Not Sure 10%
McClatchy-Marist	403	± 4.9%	February 4–9, 2014	8%	13%	5%	13%	—	1%	9%	2%	12%	9%	2%	7%	Sarah Palin 8%Undecided 12%
McClatchy-Marist	403	± 4.9%	February 4–9, 2014	12%	—	6%	15%	—	1%	11%	3%	15%	13%	4%	8%	Undecided 14%
CNN/ORC	?	± 5%	January 31 –February 2, 2014	10%	10%	8%	14%	—	—	13%	8%	9%	9%	4%	—	Other 8%None/No one 3%No opinion 4%
Public Policy Polling	457	± 4.6%	January 23–26, 2014	14%	13%	8%	16%	5%	—	11%	—	8%	8%	—	6%	Other/Not Sure 10%
Public Policy Polling	457	± 4.6%	January 23–26, 2014	18%	17%	11%	—	5%	—	13%	—	8%	9%	—	7%	Other/Not Sure 11%
Washington Post-ABC News	457	± 5%	January 20–23, 2014	18%	13%	12%	—	—	—	11%	—	10%	20%	—	—	Other 2%None/no-one 5%Undecided 9%
Quinnipiac	813	± 3.4%	January 15–19, 2014	11%	12%	9%	—	3%	2%	13%	—	8%	13%	—	6%	Wouldn't vote 1%Don't know 22%
NBC News/Marist	358	± 5%	January 12–14, 2014	8%	16%	5%	—	3%	—	9%	6%	7%	12%	5%	4%	Undecided 25%

=== Polls conducted in 2013 and 2012 ===
Polls in 2013 and 2012

Poll source	Sample size	Margin of error	Date(s) administered	Jeb Bush	Chris Christie	Ted Cruz	Bobby Jindal	Rand Paul	Rick Perry	Marco Rubio	Paul Ryan	Rick Santorum	Scott Walker	Others
Fox News	376	± 5%	December 14–16, 2013	12%	16%	12%	—	11%	3%	8%	12%	3%	6%	Other 1%None 5%Don't know 11%
Public Policy Polling	600	± 3.9%	December 12–15, 2013	10%	19%	14%	3%	11%	—	7%	10%	—	4%	Mike Huckabee 13%Other/Not Sure 10%
Public Policy Polling	600	± 3.9%	December 12–15, 2013	12%	23%	15%	4%	12%	—	8%	11%	—	6%	Other/Not Sure 10%
Fairleigh Dickinson University	343	± ?%	December 9–15, 2013	—	18%	14%	—	15%	—	11%	—	—	4%	Other 16%Don't know 21%
Quinnipiac	1,182	± 1.9%	December 3–9, 2013	11%	17%	13%	3%	14%	—	7%	9%	—	5%	John Kasich 2%Other 2%Wouldn't vote 1%Don't know 17%
McClatchy-Marist	419	± 4.8%	December 3–5, 2013	10%	18%	10%	—	12%	3%	7%	11%	4%	4%	Sarah Palin 8%Undecided 13%
CNN/ORC	418	± 5%	November 18–20, 2013	6%	24%	10%	—	13%	7%	9%	11%	6%	—	Other 6%None/No-one 2%No opinion 6%
NBC News	428	± 5.5%	November 7–10, 2013	—	32%	—	—	—	—	—	—	—	—	Another Republican 31%Wouldn't vote 1%Don't know 35%
Rasmussen	?	± ?	November 7–8, 2013	12%	22%	12%	—	20%	—	16%	—	—	5%	Don't know 13%
Public Policy Polling	629	± 3.9%	October 29–31, 2013	12%	15%	14%	5%	13%	—	9%	9%	4%	—	Sarah Palin 7%Other/Not Sure 12%
Public Policy Polling	629	± 3.9%	October 29–31, 2013	14%	16%	15%	6%	16%	—	10%	11%	5%	—	Other/Not Sure 8%

Poll source	Sample size	Margin of error	Date(s) administered	Jeb Bush	Chris Christie	Ted Cruz	Bobby Jindal	Susana Martinez	Rand Paul	Rick Perry	Marco Rubio	Paul Ryan	Rick Santorum	Scott Walker	Others
Quinnipiac			September 23–29, 2013	11%	13%	10%	3%	—	17%	—	12%	10%	—	4%	Don't know 20%
Public Policy Polling	743	± 3.6%	September 25–26, 2013	11%	14%	20%	—	4%	17%	—	10%	10%	3%	3%	Other/Not sure 9%
CNN/ORC	452	± 4.5%	September 6–8, 2013	10%	17%	7%	—	—	13%	6%	9%	16%	5%	—	Other 6%None/no-one 4%Not sure 6%
Rasmussen	1,000	± 3%	August 1–2, 2013	16%	21%	—	—	—	15%	—	18%	13%	—	6%	Other 3%Not Sure 8%
Public Policy Polling	500	± 4.3%	July 19–21, 2013	13%	13%	12%	4%	2%	16%	—	10%	13%	4%	—	Other/Not Sure 13%
McClatchy-Marist	357	± 5.2%	July 15–18, 2013	10%	15%	7%	1%	1%	9%	4%	12%	13%	2%	2%	Other/Not Sure 25%
Public Policy Polling	806	± 3.5%	May 6–9, 2013	15%	15%	7%	3%	1%	14%	—	16%	9%	5%	—	Other/Not Sure 15%
FarleighDickinsonUniversity	323	± 5.5%	April 22–28, 2013	16%	14%	—	—	—	—	—	18%	—	9%	—	Other 21%Not sure 22%
Quinnipiac	712	± 3.7%	March 26–April 1, 2013	10%	14%	—	3%	—	15%	—	19%	17%	—	2%	Bob McDonnell 1%Other 1%Other/Not Sure 18%
Public Policy Polling	1,125	± 2.9%	March 27–30, 2013	12%	15%	—	4%	1%	17%	2%	21%	12%	5%	—	Other 1%Other/Not Sure 10%

Poll source	Sample size	Margin of error	Date(s) administered	Jeb Bush	Chris Christie	Mike Huckabee	Bobby Jindal	Susana Martinez	Rand Paul	Rick Perry	Marco Rubio	Paul Ryan	Rick Santorum	Others
Public Policy Polling	508	± 4.4%	January 31 –February 3, 2013	13%	13%	11%	4%	1%	10%	3%	22%	15%	—	Other/Not Sure 8%
Public Policy Polling	563	± 4.1%	January 3–6, 2013	14%	14%	15%	3%	2%	5%	2%	21%	16%	—	Other/Not Sure 7%
Public Policy Polling	475	± 4.5%	November 30 – December 2, 2012	12%	14%	11%	—	—	7%	—	18%	12%	4%	Condoleezza Rice 8%Sarah Palin 7%Other/Not Sure 7%
Public Policy Polling	742	± 3.6%	April 12–15, 2012	17%	21%	17%	3%	—	4%	—	10%	7%	12%	Other/Not Sure 10%

== See also ==
General election polling

- Nationwide opinion polling for the United States presidential election, 2016
- Nationwide opinion polling for the United States presidential election by demographics, 2016
- Statewide opinion polling for the United States presidential election, 2016

Democratic primary polling

- Nationwide opinion polling for the Democratic Party 2016 presidential primaries
- Statewide opinion polling for the Democratic Party presidential primaries, 2016

Republican primary polling

- Statewide opinion polling for the Republican Party presidential primaries, 2016
