= 2016 Michigan Democratic presidential primary =

- March 8, 2016

Candidate	Bernie Sanders	Hillary Clinton
Home state	Vermont	New York
Delegate count	67	63
Popular vote	598,943	581,775
Percentage	49.68%	48.26%
- Sanders: 40–50% 50–60% 60–70% Clinton: 40–50% 50–60% 60–70%

The 2016 Michigan Democratic presidential primary was held on March 8 in the U.S. state of Michigan as one of the Democratic Party's primaries ahead of the 2016 presidential election.

On the same day, the Democratic Party held a second primary in Mississippi, while the Republican Party held primaries in four states, including their own Michigan primary. Bernie Sanders' narrow win was a massive upset, with polling before the primary showing him trailing Hillary Clinton by an average of 21.4 points.

Clinton lost Michigan by a narrow margin of 0.23% in the general election, against Republican nominee Donald Trump.

== Forums and debates ==
=== March 2016 debate in Flint ===
On March 6, 2016 the Democratic Party held a seventh presidential debate at The Whiting at the Flint Cultural Center. Flint, Michigan was chosen as the center of the ongoing Flint water crisis. The debate was hosted by Anderson Cooper and aired on CNN. Participants were Hillary Clinton and Bernie Sanders. At the end of the debate, Cooper announced a labor union fund had committed $25 million in low-interest loans towards repairing the water system.

=== March 2016 forum in Detroit ===
The next day, on March 7, 2016, a Town Hall event, was held as the eighth democratic forum. It started at 6:00 p.m. E.S.T., at the Gem Theatre in Detroit, Michigan, and was aired by the Fox News Channel. The forum was moderated by Bret Baier.

== Opinion polling ==
Poll source	Date	1st	2nd	3rd	Other
Official Primary results	March 8, 2016	Bernie Sanders; 49.7%	Hillary Clinton; 48.3%		Others / Uncommitted; 2.1%
FOX 2 Detroit/Mitchell Margin of error: ± 4.5% Sample size: 482	March 7, 2016	Hillary Clinton; 61%	Bernie Sanders; 34%		Others / Undecided; 5%
FOX 2 Detroit/Mitchell Margin of error: ± 4.5% Sample size: 475	March 6, 2016	Hillary Clinton; 66%	Bernie Sanders; 29%		Others / Undecided; 5%
Monmouth Margin of error: ± 5.6% Sample size: 302	March 3–6, 2016	Hillary Clinton; 55%	Bernie Sanders; 42%		Others / Undecided; 4%
ARG Margin of error: ± 5.0% Sample size: 400	March 4–5, 2016	Hillary Clinton; 60%	Bernie Sanders; 36%		Others / Undecided; 4%
CBS News/YouGov Margin of error: ± 7.7% Sample size: 597	March 2–4, 2016	Hillary Clinton; 55%	Bernie Sanders; 44%		Others / Undecided; 1%
Mitchell/FOX 2 Margin of error: ± 4.0% Sample size: 610	March 2–3, 2016	Hillary Clinton; 55%	Bernie Sanders; 37%		Others / Undecided; 8%
NBC News/Wall St. Jrnl Margin of error: ± 4.2% Sample size: 546	March 1–3, 2016	Hillary Clinton; 57%	Bernie Sanders; 40%		Others / Undecided; 3%
MSU Margin of error: ± 6.1% Sample size: 262	January 25-March 3, 2016	Hillary Clinton; 52%	Bernie Sanders; 47%		Others / Undecided; 1%
FOX 2 Detroit/Mitchell Margin of error: ± 4.7% Sample size: 427	March 1, 2016	Hillary Clinton; 61%	Bernie Sanders; 33%		Others / Undecided; 6%
MRG Margin of error: ± 4.0% Sample size: 218	February 22–27, 2016	Hillary Clinton; 56%	Bernie Sanders; 36%		Others / Undecided; 8%
FOX 2 Detroit/Mitchell Margin of error: ± 5.3% Sample size: 344	February 23, 2016	Hillary Clinton; 65%	Bernie Sanders; 31%		Others / Undecided; 4%
ARG Margin of error: ± 5% Sample size: 400	February 19–20, 2016	Hillary Clinton; 53%	Bernie Sanders; 40%		Others / Undecided; 7%
Fox 2 Detroit/Mitchell Margin of error: ± 4.69% Sample size: 430	February 15, 2016	Hillary Clinton; 60%	Bernie Sanders; 27%		Others / Undecided 13%
Public Policy Polling Margin of error: ± 4.4; Sample size: 500	February 14–16, 2016	Hillary Clinton; 50%	Bernie Sanders; 40%		
Fox 2 Detroit/Mitchell Margin of error: ± 5.5% Sample size: 321	February 4, 2016	Hillary Clinton; 57%	Bernie Sanders; 28%		Others / Undecided 15%
IMP/Target Insyght Margin of error: ± 5.0% Sample size: 400	February 2–4, 2016	Hillary Clinton; 62%	Bernie Sanders; 30%		Others / Undecided 8%
Marketing Resource Group Margin of error: ± 4% Sample size: 600	September 9–14, 2015	Hillary Clinton; 41%	Bernie Sanders; 22%	Joe Biden 22%	Martin O'Malley 1%, Undecided 12%
Public Policy Polling Margin of error: ± 4.7% Sample size: 431	June 25–28, 2015	Hillary Clinton; 57%	Bernie Sanders; 25%	Lincoln Chafee 5%	Jim Webb 2%, Martin O'Malley 1%, Not sure 10%
Suffolk Margin of error: ± ? Sample size: 212	September 6–10, 2014	Hillary Clinton; 61%	Joe Biden; 17%	Elizabeth Warren; 7%	Andrew Cuomo 4%, Martin O'Malley 1%, Undecided 9%, Refused 1%

== Results ==
Michigan Democratic primary, March 8, 2016
Candidate	Popular vote		Estimated delegates		
Candidate	Count	Percentage	Pledged	Unpledged	Total
Bernie Sanders	598,943	49.68%	67	0	67
Hillary Clinton	581,775	48.26%	63	10	73
Uncommitted	21,601	1.79%	0	7	7
Martin O'Malley (withdrawn)	2,363	0.20%			
Rocky De La Fuente	870	0.07%			
Total	1,205,552	100%	130	17	147

Michigan Democratic primary, March 8, 2016
District	Delegates	Votes Clinton	Votes Sanders	Votes Qualified	Clinton delegates	Sanders delegates
1	6	28,860	44,359	73,219	2	4
2	5	26,090	39,834	65,924	2	3
3	5	28,441	45,282	73,723	2	3
4	5	24,928	35,597	60,525	2	3
5	7	48,622	42,755	91,377	4	3
6	5	28,265	39,157	67,422	2	3
7	5	29,186	36,019	65,205	2	3
8	5	35,205	46,969	82,174	2	3
9	6	48,570	50,903	99,473	3	3
10	5	28,314	33,710	62,024	2	3
11	6	39,732	45,054	84,786	3	3
12	7	50,157	58,892	109,049	3	4
13	9	71,235	37,028	108,263	6	3
14	9	88,494	42,608	131,102	6	3
Total	85	581,775	598,943	1,180,718	41	44
PLEO	17	581,775	598,943	1,180,718	8	9
At Large	28	581,775	598,943	1,180,718	14	14
Gr. Total	130	581,775	598,943	1,180,718	63	67
Total vote	1,205,552	48.26%	49.68%			
Source: Michigan Department of State Election results (District 13 and 14 Wayne County) partial

=== Results by county ===
County	Clinton	%	Sanders	%	Others	%	Totals	Turnout (%)	Margin (%)
Alcona	463	48.74%	455	47.89%	32	3.37%	950	10.29%	-0.85%
Alger	384	37.07%	622	60.04%	30	2.90%	1,036	14.41%	22.97%
Allegan	3,511	38.01%	5,569	60.28%	158	1.71%	9,238	11.33%	22.27%
Alpena	1,102	44.22%	1,347	54.05%	43	1.73%	2,492	10.77%	9.83%
Antrim	867	36.06%	1,491	62.02%	46	1.91%	2,404	12.04%	25.96%
Arenac	595	46.12%	663	51.40%	32	2.48%	1,290	10.74%	5.28%
Baraga	270	40.30%	371	55.37%	29	4.33%	670	10.54%	15.07%
Barry	1,736	35.40%	3,078	62.77%	90	1.84%	4,904	~11.04%	27.37%
Bay	5,937	45.94%	6,363	49.24%	622	4.81%	12,922	16.37%	3.30%
Benzie	853	33.48%	1,650	64.76%	45	1.77%	2,548	17.30%	31.28%
Berrien	6,698	51.54%	5,968	45.93%	329	2.53%	12,995	10.40%	-5.61%
Branch	1,010	43.44%	1,246	53.59%	69	2.97%	2,325	7.50%	10.15%
Calhoun	5,231	46.36%	5,812	51.51%	240	2.13%	11,283	11.41%	5.15%
Cass	1,657	48.37%	1,684	49.15%	85	2.48%	3,426	~8.60%	0.78%
Charlevoix	1,044	36.68%	1,730	60.79%	72	2.53%	2,846	13.11%	24.11%
Cheboygan	1,010	42.62%	1,318	55.61%	42	1.77%	2,370	11.33%	12.99%
Chippewa	1,230	39.82%	1,793	58.04%	70	2.27%	3,093	12.87%	18.22%
Clare	1,090	45.76%	1,239	52.02%	53	2.23%	2,382	10.33%	6.26%
Clinton	3,402	42.16%	4,496	55.72%	171	2.12%	8,069	14.88%	13.56%
Crawford	494	42.33%	631	54.07%	42	3.60%	1,167	9.91%	11.74%
Delta	1,409	43.34%	1,705	52.45%	137	4.21%	3,251	~11.22%	9.11%
Dickinson	908	43.49%	1,075	51.48%	105	5.03%	2,088	9.58%	7.99%
Eaton	5,866	43.99%	7,125	53.43%	344	2.58%	13,335	16.81%	9.44%
Emmet	1,369	33.91%	2,589	64.13%	79	1.96%	4,037	14.51%	30.22%
Genesee	31,366	51.73%	28,171	46.46%	1,097	1.81%	60,634	18.67%	-5.27%
Gladwin	985	46.29%	1,083	50.89%	60	2.82%	2,128	~10.18%	4.60%
Gogebic	678	44.84%	790	52.25%	44	2.91%	1,512	11.03%	7.41%
Grand Traverse	4,140	33.18%	8,091	64.84%	248	1.99%	12,479	17.43%	31.66%
Gratiot	1,185	38.87%	1,812	59.43%	52	1.71%	3,049	11.77%	20.56%
Hillsdale	977	40.12%	1,380	56.57%	78	3.20%	2,435	7.54%	16.45%
Houghton	1,109	34.78%	2,039	63.94%	41	1.29%	3,189	~13.18%	29.16%
Huron	1,050	45.99%	1,184	51.86%	49	2.15%	2,283	~9.13%	5.87%
Ingham	18,347	43.66%	22,986	54.70%	687	1.63%	42,020	21.61%	11.04%
Ionia	1,491	33.99%	2,812	64.11%	83	1.89%	4,386	10.29%	30.12%
Iosco	1,077	46.08%	1,202	51.43%	58	2.48%	2,337	11.17%	5.35%
Iron	527	48.30%	546	50.05%	18	1.65%	1,091	11.41%	1.75%
Isabella	2,032	33.18%	4,024	65.71%	68	1.11%	6,124	14.68%	32.53%
Jackson	5,288	42.70%	6,804	54.95%	291	2.35%	12,383	11.28%	12.25%
Kalamazoo	12,611	37.91%	20,162	60.61%	492	1.48%	33,265	17.75%	22.70%
Kalkaska	590	36.53%	987	61.11%	38	2.35%	1,615	~11.21%	24.58%
Kent	26,032	36.85%	43,444	61.49%	1,173	1.66%	70,649	16.20%	24.64%
Keweenaw	128	39.75%	188	58.39%	6	1.86%	322	~16.93%	18.64%
Lake	548	50.09%	514	46.98%	32	2.93%	1,094	~12.12%	-3.11%
Lapeer	3,325	40.39%	4,650	56.49%	257	3.12%	8,232	12.58%	16.10%
Leelanau	1,459	37.67%	2,360	60.93%	54	1.39%	3,873	19.77%	23.26%
Lenawee	3,455	43.72%	4,256	53.85%	192	2.43%	7,903	11.04%	10.13%
Livingston	6,705	38.12%	10,435	59.32%	451	2.56%	17,591	12.47%	21.20%
Luce	167	35.38%	291	61.65%	14	2.97%	472	11.04%	26.27%
Mackinac	500	42.77%	633	54.15%	36	3.08%	1,169	11.92%	11.38%
Macomb	47,599	48.80%	46,248	47.42%	3,689	3.78%	97,536	~15.80%	-1.38%
Manistee	1,120	39.58%	1,646	58.16%	64	2.26%	2,830	14.23%	18.58%
Marquette	3,188	35.57%	5,530	61.70%	245	2.73%	8,963	18.30%	26.13%
Mason	1,223	40.54%	1,741	57.71%	53	1.76%	3,017	13.44%	17.17%
Mecosta	1,173	38.88%	1,768	58.60%	76	2.52%	3,017	~11.16%	19.72%
Menominee	835	48.69%	805	46.94%	75	4.37%	1,715	9.04%	-1.75%
Midland	3,097	39.81%	4,568	58.71%	115	1.48%	7,780	~12.04%	18.90%
Missaukee	401	39.08%	591	57.60%	34	3.31%	1,026	9.66%	18.52%
Monroe	6,716	47.22%	6,842	48.11%	665	4.68%	14,223	12.31%	0.88%
Montcalm	1,681	36.81%	2,762	60.49%	123	2.69%	4,566	10.91%	23.68%
Montmorency	392	48.64%	383	47.52%	31	3.85%	806	10.23%	-1.12%
Muskegon	8,807	44.51%	10,456	52.84%	524	2.65%	19,787	16.01%	8.33%
Newaygo	1,295	36.49%	2,155	60.72%	99	2.79%	3,549	10.11%	24.23%
Oakland	92,300	51.29%	84,163	46.77%	3,193	1.77%	179,656	19.40%	-4.52%
Oceana	791	38.21%	1,237	59.76%	42	2.03%	2,070	10.86%	21.55%
Ogemaw	862	46.24%	926	49.68%	76	4.08%	1,864	11.48%	3.44%
Ontonagon	327	44.31%	362	49.05%	49	6.64%	738	~13.03%	4.74%
Osceola	670	40.39%	953	57.44%	36	2.17%	1,659	~9.71%	17.05%
Oscoda	273	44.75%	315	51.64%	22	3.61%	610	9.23%	6.89%
Otsego	786	37.95%	1,228	59.30%	57	2.75%	2,071	10.07%	21.35%
Ottawa	7,687	34.43%	14,333	64.20%	307	1.38%	22,327	11.47%	29.77%
Presque Isle	592	47.70%	606	48.83%	43	3.46%	1,241	11.59%	1.13%
Roscommon	1,163	47.28%	1,187	48.25%	110	4.47%	2,460	11.46%	0.97%
Saginaw	12,490	55.28%	9,676	42.83%	428	1.89%	22,594	15.03%	-12.45%
St. Clair	5,973	40.46%	8,347	56.54%	444	3.01%	14,764	~12.04%	16.08%
St. Joseph	1,382	37.62%	2,219	60.40%	73	1.99%	3,674	~8.49%	22.78%
Sanilac	1,160	42.00%	1,485	53.77%	117	4.24%	2,762	9.53%	11.77%
Schoolcraft	312	45.75%	345	50.59%	25	3.67%	682	10.22%	4.84%
Shiawassee	3,031	39.35%	4,452	57.80%	219	2.84%	7,702	14.28%	18.45%
Tuscola	1,984	42.58%	2,532	54.35%	143	3.07%	4,659	11.52%	11.77%
Van Buren	2,484	39.69%	3,656	58.41%	119	1.90%	6,259	11.34%	18.72%
Washtenaw	30,022	43.69%	38,062	55.39%	632	0.92%	68,716	25.67%	11.70%
Wayne	165,819	60.09%	105,487	38.23%	4,650	1.69%	275,956	21.13%	-21.86%
Wexford	909	32.91%	1,793	64.92%	60	2.17%	2,762	11.14%	32.01%
Total	582,452	48.24%	599,723	49.67%	25,222	2.09%	1,207,397	~12.67%	1.43%

=== Results by congressional district ===
District	Sanders	Clinton
1st	59.09%	38.44%
2nd	59.24%	38.80%
3rd	60.38%	37.92%
4th	57.48%	40.26%
5th	45.77%	52.05%
6th	57.03%	41.17%
7th	53.72%	43.53%
8th	56.00%	41.97%
9th	49.75%	47.47%
10th	52.32%	43.95%
11th	52.11%	45.95%
12th	53.09%	45.22%
13th	33.74%	64.92%
14th	32.10%	66.66%

== Analysis ==
Bernie Sanders's narrow, one-point win in Michigan was seen as a major upset for the Clinton campaign, since Sanders had never led a poll in that state. Many theories about the failure of the Michigan polling circulated throughout the media, with most centering on pollsters' erroneous assumptions about the composition of the electorate stemming from the 2008 primary in Michigan not having been contested due to an impasse between the state party and DNC.^{[73][74][75]} Although Clinton expanded her delegate lead with a lopsided victory in Mississippi that same day, some journalists suggested Sanders' upset might presage her defeat in other delegate-rich Midwestern Rust Belt states,^{[76]} such as Missouri, Ohio and Illinois, who voted a week later on March 15, along with North Carolina and Florida, where Clinton was more clearly favored.^{[77][78]}

Sanders beat Clinton among white voters in Michigan, who made up 70% of the electorate, by a margin of 56–42, a margin perhaps larger than the Clinton campaign had anticipated. Independents, who made up 27% of the electorate, backed Sanders 71–28. As was true in other primaries, Clinton won the votes of women and African Americans, but Sanders's margins with independents and rural voters, mostly working class whites who felt disaffected and disenfranchised by trade deals championed by Hillary Clinton and her husband, were not able to be surpassed, even by Clinton's large leads in major cities such as Detroit and Flint. Among voters who said their primary concern was the U.S. economy, Sanders won 56–40, even though Clinton had hammered him on his 2009 vote against the auto-bailout which she believed would resonate in a state whose economy depended upon manufacturing and the auto industry. Among unions, Sanders had beaten Clinton 49–46, even though in previous contests union households had broken for Clinton. Hand-wringing began on the Clinton side, with the campaign worrying they turned their attention to the general election too soon, as Hillary Clinton had pleaded "the sooner I could become your nominee, the more I could begin to turn my attention to the Republicans."

Sanders thanked supporters after his surprise win, "What tonight means is that the Bernie Sanders campaign, the people's revolution that we're talking about, the political revolution that we're talking about, is strong in every part of the country [...] And, frankly, we believe our strongest areas are yet to happen."

Clinton went on to win the next five states in the Democratic primary, including Ohio, Illinois and Missouri.

Alongside Wisconsin, Michigan was among the two "Blue Wall" states won by Bernie Sanders in the primary election that Donald Trump would ultimately flip in the general election.
