= 2016 Missouri Republican presidential primary =

- March 15, 2016
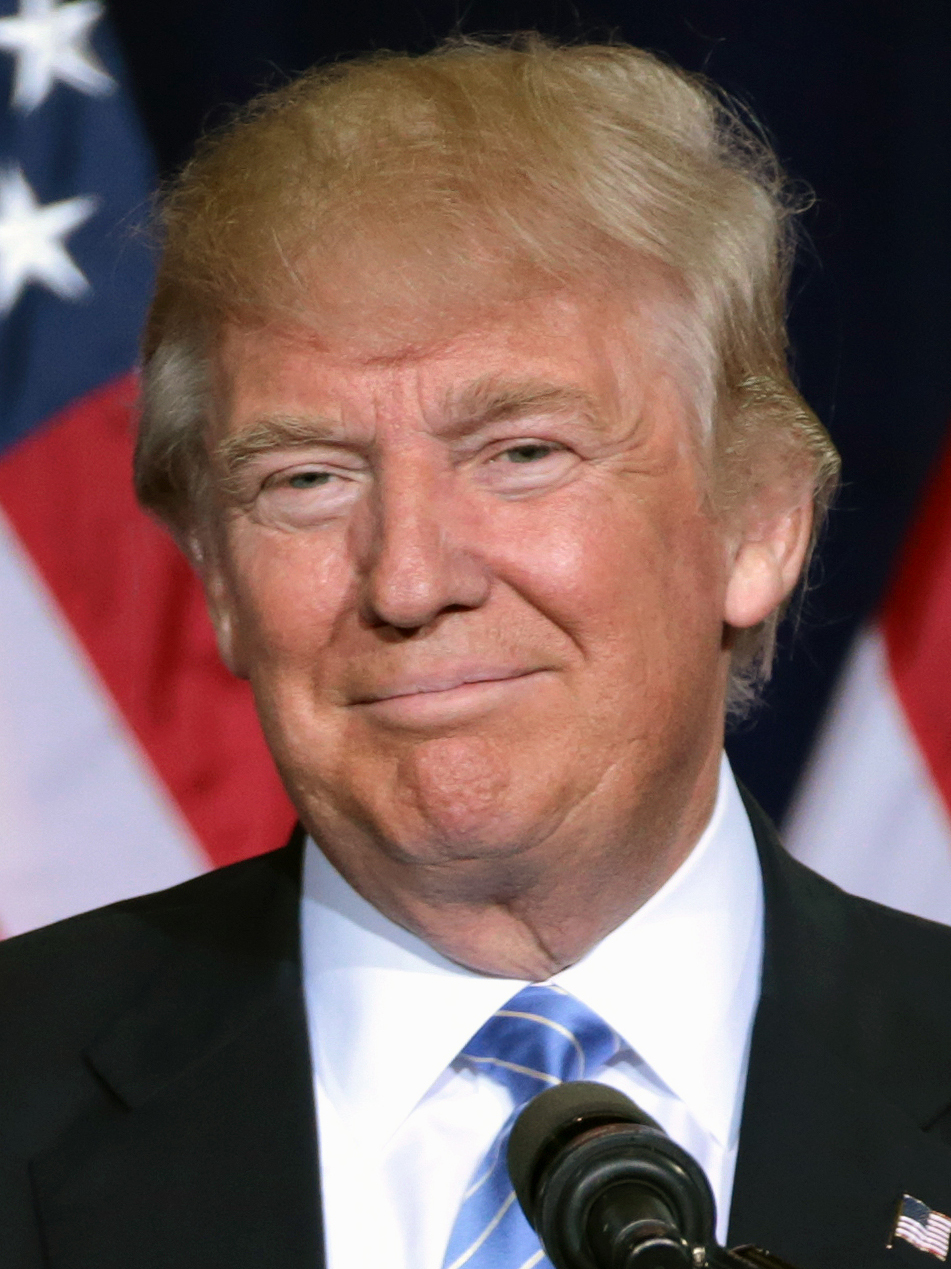

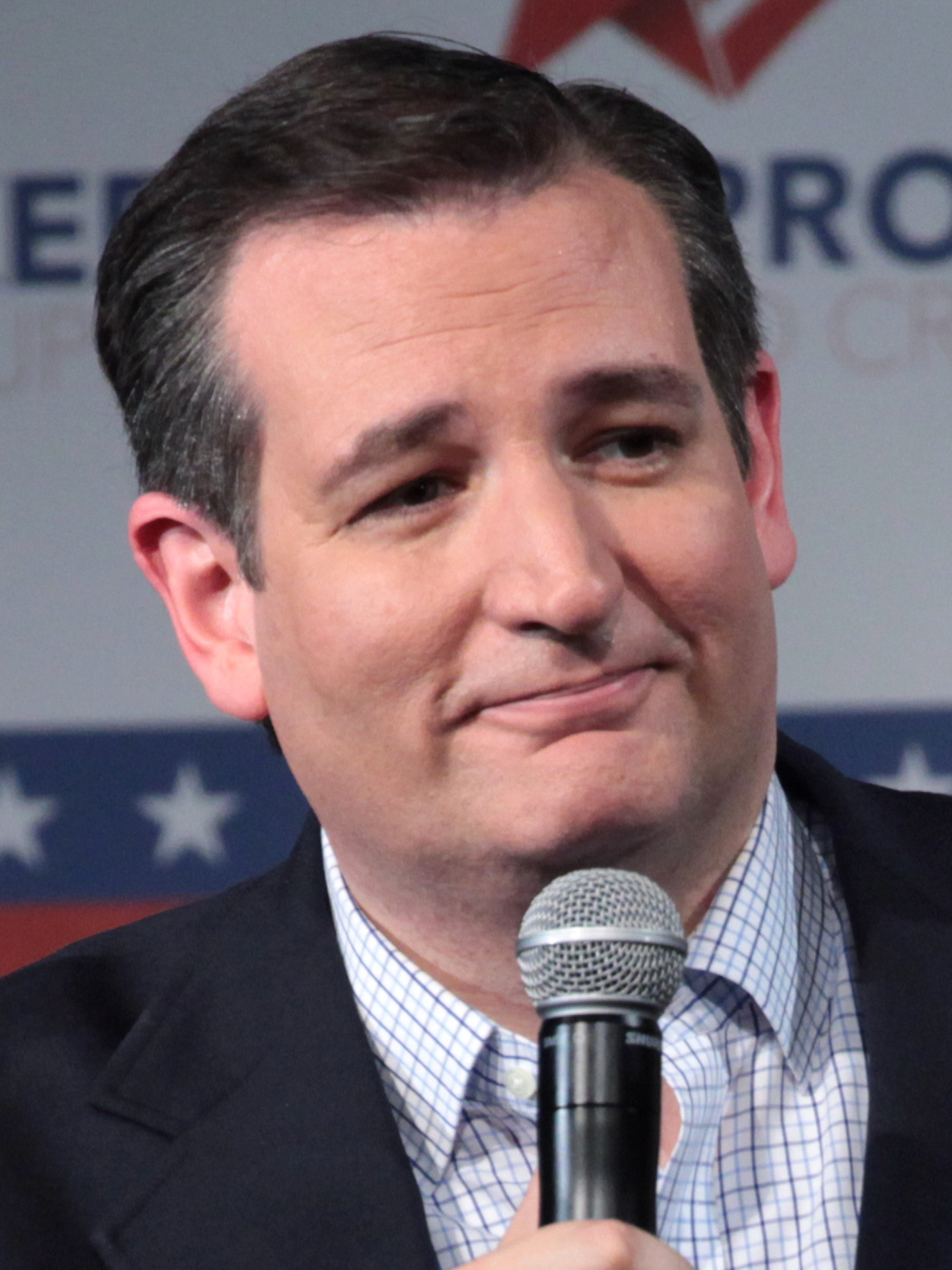

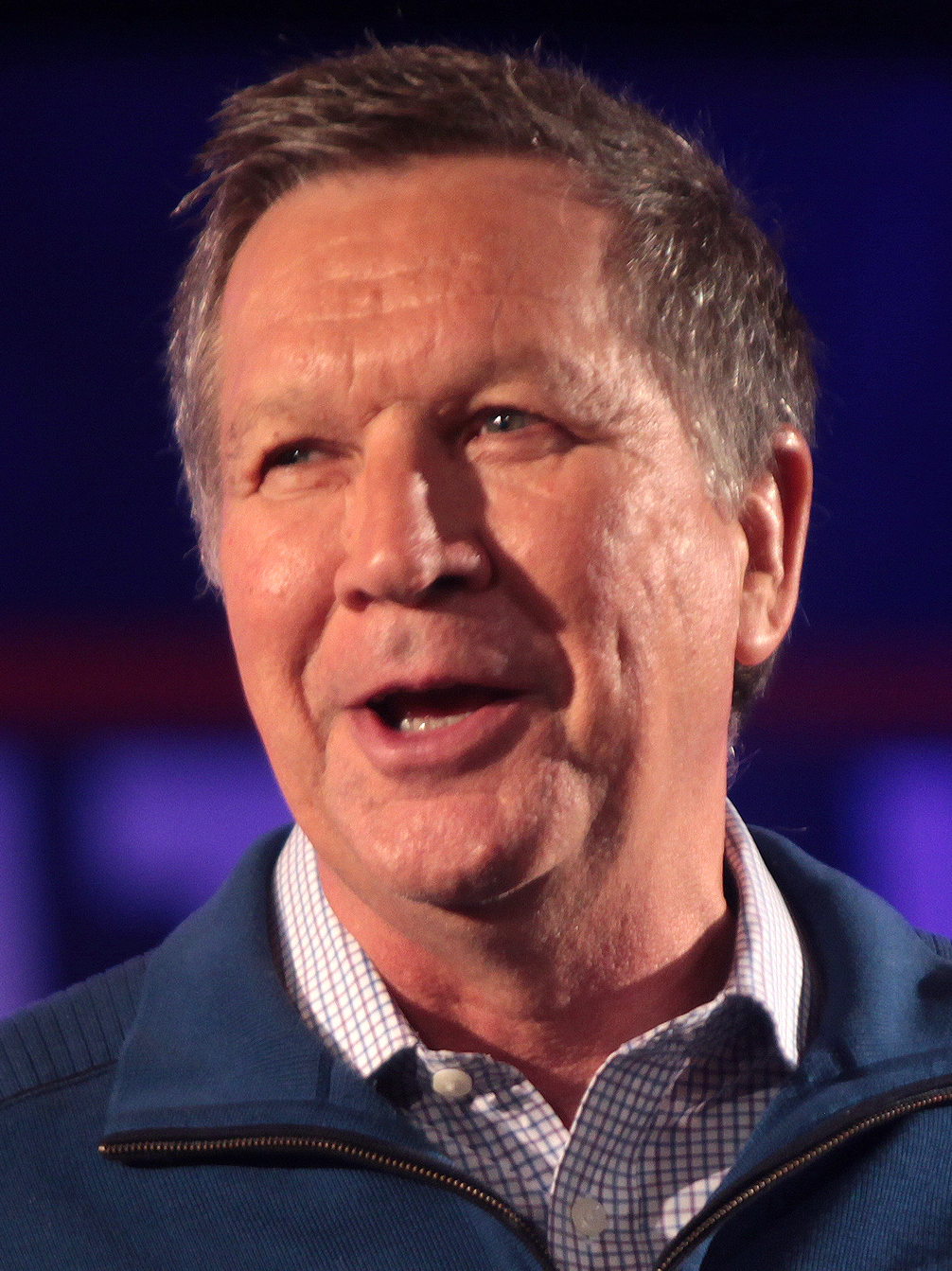

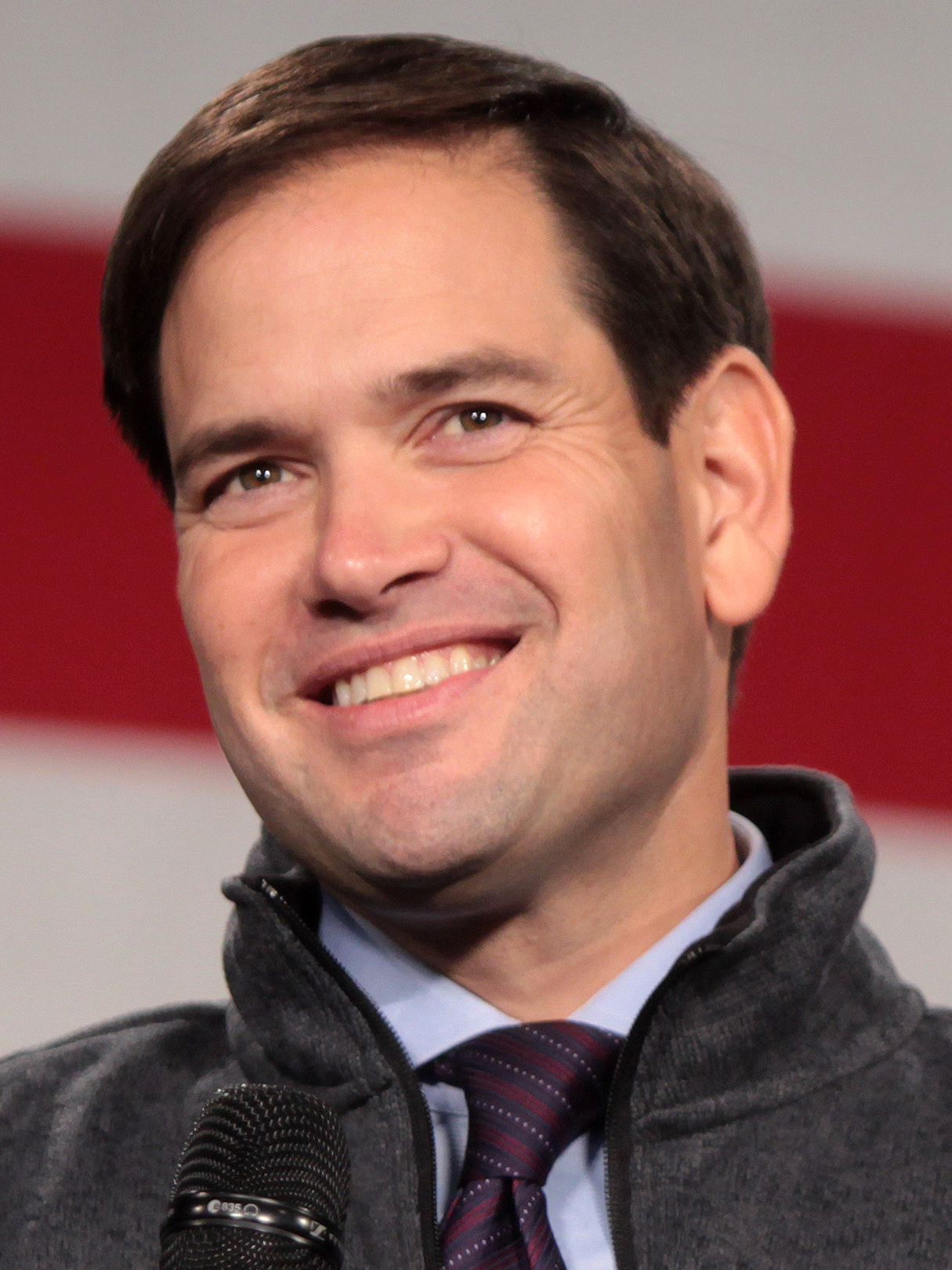
Candidate	Donald Trump	Ted Cruz
Home state	New York	Texas
Delegate count	37	15
Popular vote	383,631	381,666
Percentage	40.84%	40.63%
Candidate	John Kasich	Marco Rubio
Home state	Ohio	Florida
Delegate count	0	0
Popular vote	94,857	57,244
Percentage	10.10%	6.09%

Donald Trump
30–40%
40–50%
50–60%
60–70%
Ted Cruz
30–40%
40–50%
50–60%

The 2016 Missouri Republican presidential primary took place March 15 in the U.S. state of Missouri, as a part of the Republican Party's series of presidential primaries ahead of the 2016 United States presidential election. The Missouri primary was held alongside Republican primary elections in Florida, Illinois, North Carolina and Ohio, along with the Democratic contest in Missouri. The hotly contested primary was won by businessman Donald Trump by a margin of 0.21% over Texas Senator Ted Cruz.

== Background ==
In the 2012 primaries, the state of Missouri held two separate contests, a "beauty contest" primary on February 7 and caucuses beginning on March 15. Missouri Governor Jay Nixon signed SB892 in 2014 to move the state's presidential primary contest to March. In addition, the caucus was removed so the primary counted for delegates. According to Missouri Republican Party chair John Hancock, the move was to encourage candidates to campaign in all parts of the state and to avoid the chaotic convention fights in the 2012 campaign.

== The state of the campaign ==
=== Previous contests ===
Despite an early victory by Ted Cruz in the Iowa caucuses, Donald Trump was seen as making steady progress towards the Republican nomination at the time. Trump was victorious in 7 of the contests on March 1, with Cruz seen as the only viable threat to Trump after victories in his home state of Texas and three other March 1 contests. Marco Rubio performed worse than anticipated on March 1, taking only Minnesota. On March 8, two primaries and a caucus were held in Hawaii, Michigan and Mississippi. Despite a poll from American Research Group that showed Kasich leading Trump in Michigan, Trump won all three contests.

=== Run-up to the election ===
Poll source	Date	1st	2nd	3rd	Other
Primary results	March 15, 2016	Donald Trump; 40.84%	Ted Cruz; 40.63%	John Kasich; 10.10%	Marco Rubio 6.09%, Ben Carson 0.88%, Jeb Bush 0.36%, Mike Huckabee 0.23%, Rand Paul 0.19%, Chris Christie 0.18%, Rick Santorum 0.08%, Carly Fiorina 0.07%
Fort Hayes State University Margin of error: ± 7% Sample size: 208	March 3–10, 2016	Donald Trump; 36%	Ted Cruz; 29%	Marco Rubio; 9%	John Kasich 8%, Other 1%, Undecided 17%
Remington Research Group Margin of error: ± 2.6% Sample size: 1,528	December 18–19, 2015	Donald Trump; 33%	Ted Cruz; 23%	Marco Rubio; 12%	Ben Carson 8%, Jeb Bush 3%, Chris Christie 3%, Carly Fiorina 2%, Rand Paul 1%, John Kasich 1%, Undecided 14%
Public Policy Polling Margin of error: 4.7% Sample size: 440	August 7–8, 2015	Donald Trump; 23%	Ben Carson; 11%	Jeb Bush; 11%	Mike Huckabee 10%, Ted Cruz 9%, Scott Walker 8%, Carly Fiorina 7%, Marco Rubio 6%, John Kasich 4%, Rand Paul 4%, Chris Christie 1%, Bobby Jindal 1%, Rick Perry 1%, Rick Santorum 1%, George Pataki 0%, Lindsey Graham 0%, Jim Gilmore 0%, Someone else/Undecided 2%

While there was limited polling in Missouri prior to the primary contest, Ted Cruz and Donald Trump were projected to be the main contenders, with Trump considered to be the favorite. Missouri was considered an important state due to its "winner-take-most" nature, which could allow Trump to accrue a large net gain of delegates with a small change in the popular vote.

== Results ==
Missouri Republican primary, March 15, 2016
Candidate	Votes	Percentage	Actual delegate count		
Candidate	Votes	Percentage	Bound	Unbound	Total
Donald Trump	383,631	40.84%	37	0	37
Ted Cruz	381,666	40.63%	15	0	15
John Kasich	94,857	10.10%	0	0	0
Marco Rubio	57,244	6.09%	0	0	0
Ben Carson (withdrawn)	8,233	0.88%	0	0	0
Jeb Bush (withdrawn)	3,361	0.36%	0	0	0
Uncommitted	3,225	0.34%	0	0	0
Mike Huckabee (withdrawn)	2,148	0.23%	0	0	0
Rand Paul (withdrawn)	1,777	0.19%	0	0	0
Chris Christie (withdrawn)	1,681	0.18%	0	0	0
Rick Santorum (withdrawn)	732	0.08%	0	0	0
Carly Fiorina (withdrawn)	615	0.07%	0	0	0
Jim Lynch (withdrawn)	100	0.01%	0	0	0
Unprojected delegates:			0	0	0
Total:	939,270	100.00%	52	0	52
Source: The Green Papers

Following the March 15 contests, Marco Rubio suspended his campaign, largely due to a poor performance in Florida.

== Possible recount ==
Missouri elections law allows the second-place candidate to request a recount if they are defeated in the election by less than one half of a percent. Speculation arose that Cruz would ask for a recount, as he lost the primary by less than 2,000 votes, or 0.21 percent. However, Cruz decided not to request a recount of the election, thus conceding the primary to Trump. The recount was considered important because 12 of the 52 delegates to the Republican National Convention were awarded winner-take-all to the winner of the state.

== See also ==
- 2016 Missouri Democratic presidential primary
