= 2016 Ohio Democratic presidential primary =

- March 15, 2016

| Candidate | Hillary Clinton | Bernie Sanders |
| Home state | New York | Vermont |
| Delegate count | 81 | 62 |
| Popular vote | 696,681 | 535,395 |
| Percentage | 56.12% | 43.13% |
- Results by county: Clinton: 40–50% 50–60% 60–70% Sanders: 40–50% 50–60% 60–70%

The 2016 Ohio Democratic presidential primary took place on March 15 in the U.S. state of Ohio as one of the Democratic Party's primaries prior to the 2016 presidential election.

The same day, the Democratic Party held primaries in Florida, Illinois, Missouri and North Carolina, while the Republican Party held primaries in the same five states and a caucus in the Northern Mariana Islands, as well as their own Ohio primary.

Clinton handily won the primary, putting her upset Rust Belt loss in Michigan behind her. She earned congressional endorsements from Reps. Tim Ryan, Joyce Beatty, Marcia Fudge and Sen. Sherrod Brown, while Sanders earned one Ohio backer, Rep. Marcy Kaptur.

== Background ==
By the time Ohio held its primaries, voters from 21 states and two territories already cast their vote for the presidential nomination of the Democratic Party. As of the March 12 elections, Hillary Clinton was projected to have earned 775 pledged delegates to Bernie Sanders' 552. Clinton gained significant victories in the Southern United States, often described as her "firewall", including landslide victories in Mississippi and Alabama and Georgia. Meanwhile, Bernie Sanders gained victories in the Midwestern United States, where Ohio resides, including an upset victory in neighboring Michigan on March 8. After the fact, Sanders' campaign took advantage of the momentum gained from the Michigan win, by targeting Illinois, Missouri and Ohio in the March 15 elections, hoping to repeat the same result. Sanders stated that "Not only is Michigan the gateway to the rest of the industrial Midwest, the results there show that we are a national campaign."

Before the Michigan primaries, Clinton and Sanders had debated over economic policies relating to the industrial midwest states and the so-called "rust belt". The disagreements centered around trade deals, including the Trans-Pacific Partnership and Clinton's past support of the North American Free Trade Agreement, and its effect on economies such as Michigan and Ohio.

== Controversy ==
Ohio is one of at least seventeen states that have laws allowing voters who are 17 years of age, but will be 18 by the time of the general election, to vote in the presidential primaries. However, Ohio Secretary of State Jon A. Husted had announced in December 2015 that 17 year olds would be outright barred from participating in the 2016 primaries. The rationale for the decision was based on an interpretation of the law in which 17 year olds could "nominate" officials for office, but not "elect". In the case of the presidential primaries, by definition, voters would be electing officials - delegates to each party's presidential nominating convention. The decision was met with criticism by the public, after it was brought to mainstream attention by Representative Kathleen Clyde, after she condemned the rule in a statement released on March 5. Clyde described it as a "underhanded, backroom attack" against young voters. Nine teenagers filed a lawsuit with the Ohio Courts of Common Pleas in Franklin County over the decision, stating that the decision contradicted state law and a decision by the Supreme Court of Ohio that allowed 17 year olds turning 18 by the general election to vote.

Bernie Sanders' campaign, whose voter base includes the majority of young voters, also filed a lawsuit against the decision, accusing Husted of "arbitrarily" and "unconsititutionally" discriminating against young African-American and Latino voters, citing data from the 2010 United States census that showed younger voters in Ohio were mostly African-American and Latino. Husted, in response to Sanders' lawsuit, said in a public statement that he welcomed the lawsuit, further stating that "I am very happy to be sued on this issue because the law is crystal clear". He later spoke out negatively against the Sanders lawsuit, claiming it was "a last-minute political act" designed to "draw attention to his campaign." Many Ohio officials, past and present, such as former Ohio Secretary of State Jennifer Brunner, came out in support of Sanders' lawsuit, and had attracted protests by not only Bernie Sanders supporters, but also Donald Trump supporters as well. In a decision handed down on March 11, an Ohio state judge ruled in favour of both lawsuits by the teenage group and the Sanders campaign, effectively lifting the ban on 17 year olds from voting in the Ohio presidential primaries. Husted initially announced that he would appeal the ruling, but after learning that an appeal would not be heard by the court until the day before the primaries, he retracted his intent to appeal.

== Debates and forums ==
March 13, 2016 – Columbus, Ohio

The ninth forum was held at 8:00 pm EDT on March 13, 2016, at the campus of Ohio State University in Columbus, Ohio, and aired on CNN.

March 14, 2016 – Columbus, Ohio and Springfield, Illinois

The tenth forum was held at 6:00 pm EDT on March 14, 2016, at the campus of Ohio State University in Columbus, Ohio, and at the Old State Capitol State Historic Site in Springfield, Illinois. It aired on MSNBC. The first section of the town hall with Bernie Sanders was moderated by Chuck Todd; the second section of the town hall with Hillary Clinton was moderated by Chris Matthews.

== Opinion polling ==
| Poll source | Date | 1st | 2nd | Other |
|---|---|---|---|---|
| Primary results | March 15, 2016 | Hillary Clinton; 56.1% | Bernie Sanders; 43.1% | Other; 0.8% |
| ARG Margin of error: ± 5.0% Sample size: 400 | March 12–13, 2016 | Hillary Clinton; 52% | Bernie Sanders; 45% | Others / Undecided; 3% |
| Monmouth Margin of error: ± 5.6% Sample size: 302 | March 11–13, 2016 | Hillary Clinton; 54% | Bernie Sanders; 40% | Others / Undecided; 6% |
| Quinnipiac Margin of error: ± 4.2% Sample size: 543 | March 8–13, 2016 | Hillary Clinton; 51% | Bernie Sanders; 46% | Others / Undecided; 4% |
| Public Policy Polling Margin of error: ± 4.4% Sample size: 502 | March 11–12, 2016 | Hillary Clinton; 46% | Bernie Sanders; 41% | Others / Undecided; 13% |
| CBS News/YouGov Margin of error: ± 5.3% Sample size: 777 | March 9–11, 2016 | Hillary Clinton; 52% | Bernie Sanders; 43% | Others / Undecided; 5% |
| NBC News/Wall Street Journal/Marist Margin of error: ± 4.6% Sample size: 453 | March 4–10, 2016 | Hillary Clinton; 58% | Bernie Sanders; 38% | Others / Undecided; 4% |
| Quinnipiac Margin of error: ± 4.3% Sample size: 521 | March 2–7, 2016 | Hillary Clinton; 52% | Bernie Sanders; 43% | Others / Undecided; 5% |
| Public Polling Policy Margin of error: ± 4.4% Sample size: 508 | March 4–6, 2016 | Hillary Clinton; 56% | Bernie Sanders; 35% | Others / Undecided; 9% |
| CNN/ORC Margin of error: ± 5.5% Sample size: 294 | March 2–6, 2016 | Hillary Clinton; 63% | Bernie Sanders; 33% | Others / Undecided; 4% |
| Quinnipiac University Margin of error: ± 4.3% Sample size: 518 | February 16–20, 2016 | Hillary Clinton; 55% | Bernie Sanders; 40% | Others / Undecided; 5% |
| BW Community Research Institute Margin of error: ± 5% Sample size: 385 | February 11–20, 2016 | Bernie Sanders; 45% | Hillary Clinton; 44% | Others / Undecided; 11% |
| Public Policy Polling Margin of error: ± ?% Sample size: 1,138 | January 12–14, 2016 | Hillary Clinton; 53% | Bernie Sanders; 37% | Not sure 10% |

Polls in 2015

| Poll source | Date | 1st | 2nd | 3rd | Other |
|---|---|---|---|---|---|
| Quinnipiac University Margin of error: ± 4.9% Sample size: 396 | September 25 – October 5, 2015 | Hillary Clinton; 40% | Joe Biden; 21% | Bernie Sanders; 19% | Undecided 11% |
| Quinnipiac University Margin of error: ± 5.2% Sample size: 353 | August 7–18, 2015 | Hillary Clinton; 47% | Bernie Sanders; 17% | Joe Biden; 14% | Jim Webb 1%, Martin O'Malley 0%, Lincoln Chafee 0%, Other 3%, Wouldn't vote 6%, Undecided 12% |
| Quinnipiac University Margin of error: ± 5% Sample size: 388 | June 4–15, 2015 | Hillary Clinton; 60% | Joe Biden; 13% | Bernie Sanders; 10% | Martin O'Malley 1%, Lincoln Chafee 0%, Jim Webb 0%, Other 1%, Wouldn't vote 3%, Undecided 11% |
| Public Policy Polling Margin of error: ± 5.2% Sample size: 360 | June 4–7, 2015 | Hillary Clinton; 61% | Bernie Sanders; 13% | Michael Bloomberg; 7% | Lincoln Chafee 2%, Martin O'Malley 2%, Jim Webb 1%, Not sure 13% |
| Quinnipiac University Margin of error: ± 5.4% Sample size: 324 | March 17–28, 2015 | Hillary Clinton; 54% | Elizabeth Warren; 14% | Joe Biden; 9% | Martin O'Malley 3%, Bernie Sanders 3%, Jim Webb 2%, Other 1%, Wouldn't vote 3%, Undecided 12% |
| Quinnipiac University Margin of error: ± 5.4% Sample size: 324 | March 17–28, 2015 | Joe Biden; 34% | Elizabeth Warren; 25% | Martin O'Malley; 5% | Bernie Sanders 5%, Jim Webb 2%, Other 1%, Wouldn't vote 3%, Undecided 24% |
| Quinnipiac University Margin of error: ± 5.5% Sample size: 315 | January 22 – February 1, 2015 | Hillary Clinton; 51% | Elizabeth Warren; 14% | Joe Biden; 7% | Bernie Sanders 5%, Martin O'Malley 1%, Jim Webb 0%, Other 2%, Wouldn't vote 4%, Undecided 15% |
| Quinnipiac University Margin of error: ± 5.5% Sample size: 315 | January 22 – February 1, 2015 | Joe Biden; 28% | Elizabeth Warren; 24% | Bernie Sanders; 7% | Martin O'Malley 2%, Jim Webb 2%, Other 4%, Wouldn't vote 5%, Undecided 28% |

== Results ==
Ohio Democratic primary, March 15, 2016
| Candidate | Popular vote | | Estimated delegates | | |
| Candidate | Count | Percentage | Pledged | Unpledged | Total |
|---|---|---|---|---|---|
| Hillary Clinton | 696,681 | 56.12% | 81 | 14 | 95 |
| Bernie Sanders | 535,395 | 43.13% | 62 | 1 | 63 |
| Rocky De La Fuente | 9,402 | 0.76% | | | |
| Uncommitted | —N/a | | | 2 | 2 |
| Total | 1,241,478 | 100% | 143 | 17 | 160 |

Ohio Democratic primary, March 15, 2016
| District | Delegates available | Votes | | | | | Delegates | |
| District | Delegates available | Clinton | Sanders | De La Fuente | Total | Qualified total | Clinton | Sanders |
|---|---|---|---|---|---|---|---|---|
| 1 | 4 | 42,600 | 29,747 | 272 | 72,619 | 72,347 | 2 | 2 |
| 2 | 4 | 39,061 | 30,597 | 483 | 70,141 | 69,658 | 2 | 2 |
| 3 | 12 | 59,740 | 43,898 | 302 | 103,940 | 103,638 | 7 | 5 |
| 4 | 4 | 29,317 | 25,831 | 677 | 55,825 | 55,148 | 2 | 2 |
| 5 | 4 | 32,068 | 32,279 | 544 | 64,891 | 64,347 | 2 | 2 |
| 6 | 4 | 32,611 | 27,413 | 1,545 | 61,569 | 60,024 | 2 | 2 |
| 7 | 4 | 33,596 | 27,823 | 745 | 62,164 | 61,419 | 2 | 2 |
| 8 | 4 | 26,463 | 21,879 | 413 | 48,755 | 48,342 | 2 | 2 |
| 9 | 8 | 55,401 | 42,141 | 680 | 98,222 | 97,542 | 5 | 3 |
| 10 | 4 | 41,641 | 31,089 | 350 | 73,080 | 72,730 | 2 | 2 |
| 11 | 17 | 91,235 | 43,124 | 382 | 134,741 | 134,359 | 12 | 5 |
| 12 | 4 | 38,046 | 34,109 | 352 | 72,507 | 72,155 | 2 | 2 |
| 13 | 8 | 56,933 | 45,981 | 1,055 | 103,969 | 102,914 | 4 | 4 |
| 14 | 4 | 43,317 | 33,627 | 537 | 77,481 | 76,944 | 2 | 2 |
| 15 | 4 | 33,764 | 32,516 | 516 | 66,796 | 66,280 | 2 | 2 |
| 16 | 4 | 40,888 | 33,341 | 549 | 74,778 | 74,229 | 2 | 2 |
| Total | 93 | 696,681 | 535,395 | 9,402 | 1,241,478 | 1,232,076 | 52 | 41 |
| PLEO | 19 | 696,681 | 535,395 | 9,402 | 1,241,478 | 1,232,076 | 11 | 8 |
| At Large | 31 | 696,681 | 535,395 | 9,402 | 1,241,478 | 1,232,076 | 18 | 13 |
| Gr. Total | 143 | 696,681 | 535,395 | 9,402 | 1,241,478 | 1,232,076 | 81 | 62 |
| Total vote | | 56.12% | 43.13% | 0.76% | 100.00% | 99.24% | | |
Source: Ohio Secretary of State Presidential Preference Primary Precinct Level Official Results (Democrat)

=== Results by county ===
| County | Clinton | Votes | Sanders | Votes |
|---|---|---|---|---|
| Adams | 56.8% | 877 | 41.3% | 638 |
| Allen | 56.6% | 3,670 | 42.1% | 2,730 |
| Ashland | 49.1% | 1,451 | 49.5% | 1,465 |
| Ashtabula | 54.9% | 5,320 | 43.9% | 4,256 |
| Athens | 38.2% | 3,533 | 61.2% | 5,663 |
| Auglaize | 51.0% | 1,031 | 47.1% | 952 |
| Belmont | 53.1% | 3,982 | 43.5% | 3,263 |
| Belmont | 58.3% | 1,562 | 39.8% | 1,067 |
| Butler | 53.4% | 12,874 | 46.0% | 11,102 |
| Carroll | 51.4% | 1,084 | 46.2% | 976 |
| Champaign | 51.9% | 1,226 | 46.6% | 1,099 |
| Clark | 58.7% | 7,107 | 40.5% | 4,905 |
| Clermont | 49.4% | 5,642 | 50.0% | 5,710 |
| Clinton | 48.5% | 909 | 50.3% | 942 |
| Columbiana | 52.6% | 4,106 | 45.8% | 3,573 |
| Coshocton | 53.6% | 1,358 | 44.5% | 1,128 |
| Crawford | 51.4% | 1,344 | 43.6% | 1,141 |
| Cuyahoga | 63.2% | 125,914 | 36.3% | 72,297 |
| Darke | 54.2% | 1,246 | 43.4% | 999 |
| Defiance | 50.6% | 1,507 | 48.2% | 1,435 |
| Delaware | 57.9% | 9,552 | 41.8% | 6,891 |
| Erie | 55.3% | 5,449 | 43.6% | 4,299 |
| Fairfield | 55.3% | 6,408 | 43.8% | 5,074 |
| Fayette | 58.3% | 760 | 40.9% | 533 |
| Franklin | 55.3% | 84,654 | 44.4% | 67,855 |
| Fulton | 48.7% | 1,480 | 50.3% | 1,528 |
| Gallia | 47.7% | 945 | 48.8% | 966 |
| Geauga | 54.0% | 4,171 | 45.5% | 3,516 |
| Greene | 49.4% | 6,672 | 50.0% | 6,759 |
| Guernsey | 53.0% | 1,440 | 45.2% | 1,228 |
| Hamilton | 59.5% | 57,687 | 40.2% | 38,956 |
| Hancock | 44.9% | 2,062 | 54.2% | 2,490 |
| Hardin | 52.6% | 771 | 45.7% | 669 |
| Harrison | 53.2% | 818 | 43.8% | 674 |
| Henry | 50.0% | 977 | 48.7% | 952 |
| Highland | 55.2% | 1,119 | 43.1% | 873 |
| Hocking | 52.3% | 1,204 | 46.0% | 1,060 |
| Holmes | 48.8% | 561 | 48.5% | 558 |
| Huron | 50.9% | 2,036 | 47.7% | 1,907 |
| Jackson | 58.3% | 1,010 | 40.1% | 694 |
| Jefferson | 54.7% | 4,328 | 42.3% | 3,353 |
| Knox | 48.5% | 1,902 | 50.6% | 1,987 |
| Lake | 54.3% | 12,506 | 44.9% | 10,351 |
| Lawrence | 55.4% | 2,654 | 41.6% | 1,994 |
| Licking | 53.3% | 6,785 | 45.9% | 5,849 |
| Logan | 49.6% | 1,012 | 48.9% | 998 |
| Lorain | 56.1% | 21,144 | 42.9% | 16,154 |
| Lucas | 56.9% | 32,137 | 42.7% | 24,111 |
| Madison | 56.8% | 1,225 | 42.8% | 923 |
| Mahoning | 59.3% | 21,000 | 39.7% | 14,066 |
| Marion | 56.9% | 2,585 | 42.0% | 1,909 |
| Medina | 53.1% | 7,913 | 46.3% | 6,888 |
| Meigs | 49.9% | 800 | 47.2% | 757 |
| Mercer | 53.5% | 1,037 | 44.4% | 860 |
| Miami | 53.2% | 3,155 | 45.6% | 2,706 |
| Monroe | 48.1% | 1,191 | 45.9% | 1,138 |
| Montgomery | 59.4% | 33,352 | 40.1% | 22,538 |
| Morgan | 56.2% | 566 | 42.7% | 430 |
| Morrow | 52.1% | 1,164 | 46.3% | 1,035 |
| Muskingum | 56.6% | 3,066 | 42.4% | 2,299 |
| Noble | 53.9% | 522 | 41.7% | 404 |
| Ottawa | 55.4% | 2,566 | 43.4% | 2,012 |
| Paulding | 55.8% | 723 | 41.7% | 540 |
| Perry | 56.7% | 1,465 | 41.4% | 1,070 |
| Pickaway | 55.6% | 2,097 | 43.2% | 1,631 |
| Pike | 56.8% | 1,336 | 40.3% | 949 |
| Portage | 49.0% | 8,665 | 50.2% | 8,877 |
| Preble | 52.2% | 1,176 | 46.4% | 1,046 |
| Putnam | 45.3% | 811 | 52.3% | 936 |
| Richland | 55.5% | 5,225 | 43.3% | 4,080 |
| Ross | 57.2% | 3,582 | 41.4% | 2,595 |
| Sandusky | 53.4% | 2,866 | 45.7% | 2,456 |
| Scioto | 53.7% | 3,499 | 44.6% | 2,903 |
| Seneca | 49.6% | 2,081 | 49.2% | 2,064 |
| Shelby | 52.3% | 1,284 | 45.2% | 1,110 |
| Stark | 56.5% | 21,515 | 42.6% | 16,235 |
| Summit | 56.6% | 38,874 | 42.9% | 29,451 |
| Trumbull | 53.9% | 17,903 | 44.4% | 14,726 |
| Tuscarawas | 51.6% | 4,479 | 46.3% | 4,019 |
| Union | 50.8% | 1,580 | 48.3% | 1,501 |
| Van Wert | 51.9% | 710 | 45.4% | 621 |
| Vinton | 49.5% | 515 | 47.7% | 496 |
| Warren | 53.3% | 6,970 | 46.3% | 6,054 |
| Washington | 50.5% | 2,557 | 47.6% | 2,411 |
| Wayne | 51.3% | 3,448 | 48.0% | 3,225 |
| Williams | 45.8% | 1,007 | 52.6% | 1,156 |
| Wood | 45.8% | 6,108 | 53.7% | 7,165 |
| Wyandot | 49.7% | 661 | 48.6% | 647 |
| Total | 56.5% | 679,266 | 42.7% | 513,549 |

== Analysis ==
Clinton received a commanding win in the Ohio primary which mirrored her 2008 performance. Clinton won the white vote 53–47 which comprised 74% of the Ohio electorate. She also won the African American vote, 71–28. And while Sanders won men 51–48 and voters under the age of 45 65–34, Clinton won women 63–36 (including white women 61–38 who made up 41% of the electorate, and won both married and unmarried women) and she won older voters 70–29. She swept all income levels and educational attainment levels in Ohio. She also won unions, an important demographic in the industrial Rust Belt, by a margin of 55–45.

In terms of political ideology, Clinton swept all groups: liberals, moderates, and conservatives. She won Democrats 64–35, but lost Independents 66–33 to Sanders.

Clinton swept most counties in the state, winning urban areas 61–38, suburban areas 63–36, and rural areas by a modest 51–48. Clinton won in the Cleveland area 63–35, in Northern Ohio 57–43, in the Ohio Valley and Western Ohio 52–47, in the Columbus area 52–47, and in Cincinnati/Dayton, 55–45.
