= 2016 Florida Democratic presidential primary =

- March 15, 2016

Candidate	Hillary Clinton	Bernie Sanders
Home state	New York	Vermont
Delegate count	141	73
Popular vote	1,101,414	568,839
Percentage	64.4%	33.3%
- Results by county Clinton: 40-50% 50-60% 60-70% 70-80% Sanders: 40-50% 50-60%

The 2016 Florida Democratic presidential primary took place on March 15 in the U.S. state of Florida as one of the Democratic Party's primaries ahead of the 2016 presidential election.

On the same day, the Democratic Party held primaries in Illinois, Missouri, North Carolina and Ohio, while the Republican Party held primaries in the same five states, including their own Florida primary, plus the Northern Mariana Islands.

Clinton's landslide was fueled by support from retirees, Jewish and Latino voters in South Florida.

== Debates and forums ==
=== March 2016 debate in Miami ===
On March 9, 2016, the Democratic Party held an eighth presidential debate at Miami Dade College in Miami, Florida. It was broadcast through a partnership between Univision and The Washington Post.

== Opinion polling ==
Poll source	Date	1st	2nd	Other
Official Primary results	March 15, 2016	Hillary Clinton; 64.4%	Bernie Sanders; 33.3%	Other; 2.3%
ARG Margin of error: ± 5.0% Sample size: 400	March 11–13, 2016	Hillary Clinton; 58%	Bernie Sanders; 37%	Others / Undecided 5%
Quinnipiac Margin of error: ± 4.3% Sample size: 519	March 8–13, 2016	Hillary Clinton; 60%	Bernie Sanders; 34%	Others / Undecided 6%
Public Policy Polling Margin of error: ± 3.9% Sample size: 627	March 11–12, 2016	Hillary Clinton; 57%	Bernie Sanders; 32%	Others / Undecided 11%
CBS News/YouGov Margin of error: ± 4.5% Sample size: 796	March 9–11, 2016	Hillary Clinton; 62%	Bernie Sanders; 34%	Others / Undecided 4%
Florida Atlantic University Margin of error: ± 5% Sample size: 414	March 8–11, 2016	Hillary Clinton; 59%	Bernie Sanders; 31%	Others / Undecided 10%
NBC News/Wall Street Journal/Marist Margin of error: ± 4.4% Sample size: 500	March 4–10, 2016	Hillary Clinton; 61%	Bernie Sanders; 34%	Others / Undecided 5%
WTSP/Mason-Dixon Margin of error: ± 4.5% Sample size: 500	March 7–9, 2016	Hillary Clinton; 68%	Bernie Sanders; 23%	Others / Undecided 9%
Quinnipiac Margin of error: ± 4.3% Sample size: 511	March 2–7, 2016	Hillary Clinton; 62%	Bernie Sanders; 32%	Others / Undecided 6%
SurveyUSA/Bay News 9/News 13 Margin of error: ± 3.4% Sample size: 823	March 4–6, 2016	Hillary Clinton; 61%	Bernie Sanders; 30%	Others / Undecided 9%
CNN/ORC Margin of error: ± 6.0% Sample size: 264	March 2–6, 2016	Hillary Clinton; 61%	Bernie Sanders; 34%	Others / Undecided 5%
Wash Post/Univision Margin of error: ± 6.0% Sample size: 449	March 2–5, 2016	Hillary Clinton; 64%	Bernie Sanders; 26%	Others / Undecided 10%
University of North Florida Margin of error: ± 3.7% Sample size: 685	February 22–27, 2016	Hillary Clinton; 54%	Bernie Sanders; 24%	Others / Undecided 22%
Public Policy Polling Margin of error: ± 5% Sample size: 388	February 24–25, 2016	Hillary Clinton; 57%	Bernie Sanders; 32%	Others / Undecided 11%
Gravis Marketing Margin of error: ± 4.3% Sample size: 514	February 24, 2016	Hillary Clinton; 58%	Bernie Sanders; 42%	
Quinnipiac Margin of error: ± 4.5% Sample size: 476	February 21–24, 2016	Hillary Clinton; 59%	Bernie Sanders; 33%	Others / Undecided 8%
Florida Southern College Margin of error: ± 4.0% Sample Size: 608	January 30 – February 6, 2016	Hillary Clinton; 43%	Bernie Sanders; 26%	Others / Undecided 31%
Florida Atlantic University Margin of error: ± 5.0% Sample Size: 371	January 15–18, 2016	Hillary Clinton; 62%	Bernie Sanders; 26%	Martin O'Malley 2% Not Reported

Polls in 2015

Poll source	Date	1st	2nd	Other
Florida Atlantic University Margin of error: ± 5.2% Sample Size: 355	November 15–16, 2015	Hillary Clinton; 66%	Bernie Sanders; 22%	Martin O'Malley 4% Other 4.5% Undecided 3.7%
Bay News 9/ News13 Margin of error: ± 3.9% Sample size: 826	October 28 – November 1, 2015	Hillary Clinton; 66%	Bernie Sanders; 24%	Martin O'Malley 3% Other 2% Undecided 6%
Saint Leo University Polling Institute Margin of error: ±6.0% Sample size: 165	October 17–22, 2015	Hillary Clinton; 50.9%	Joe Biden 15.2%	Bernie Sanders 13.3% Unsure/Don't Know 8.5%
Quinnipiac University Margin of error: ± 4.8% Sample size: 411	September 25 – October 5, 2015	Hillary Clinton; 43%	Joe Biden; 19%	Bernie Sanders 19% Someone else/Undecided 13%
Public Policy Polling Margin of error: ± 5.1% Sample size: 368	September 11–13, 2015	Hillary Clinton; 55%	Bernie Sanders; 18%	Joe Biden 17% Martin O'Malley 2% Jim Webb 1% Lincoln Chafee 1% Lawrence Lessig 0% Someone else/Undecided 6%
Gravis Marketing Margin of error: ± 4% Sample size: 693	September 5–11, 2015	Hillary Clinton; 41.6%	Joe Biden; 21.4%	Bernie Sanders 12.5% Martin O'Malley 1.5% Jim Webb 1.3% Lincoln Chafee 0.4% Unsure 21.3%
Quinnipiac University Margin of error: ± 5% Sample size: 419	Posted September 4, 2015	Hillary Clinton; 52%	Bernie Sanders; 20%	Joe Biden 15% Lincoln Chafee 4% Martin O'Malley 1% Jim Webb 1% Other 1% Undecided 6%
Quinnipiac University Margin of error: ± 5.3% Sample size: 345	August 7–18, 2015	Hillary Clinton; 48%	Bernie Sanders; 15%	Joe Biden 11% Martin O'Malley 1% Jim Webb 1% Lincoln Chafee 0% Other 2% Wouldn't vote 6% Undecided 17%
St Pete Polls Margin of error: ± 3.0% Sample size: 1080	July 18–28, 2015	Hillary Clinton; 55%	Bernie Sanders; 29%	Jim Webb 2% Martin O'Malley 1% Lincoln Chafee <1% Unsure or someone else 13%
Mason-Dixon Margin of error: ± 4.5% Sample size: 500	July 20–23, 2015	Hillary Clinton; 58%	Bernie Sanders; 17%	Martin O'Malley 2% Lincoln Chafee 0% Jim Webb 0% Undecided 23%
Gravis Marketing Margin of error: ± 3% Sample size: 881	June 16–20, 2015	Hillary Clinton; 64.8%	Bernie Sanders; 20.6%	Martin O'Malley 2.1% Bill De Blasio 1.7% Jim Webb 0.9% Lincoln Chafee 0.4% Unsure 9.5%
Quinnipiac University Margin of error: ± 5% Sample size: 378	June 4–15, 2015	Hillary Clinton; 64%	Joe Biden; 9%	Bernie Sanders 8% Martin O'Malley 1% Lincoln Chafee 0% Jim Webb 0% Other 1% Wouldn't vote 5% Undecided 13%
Quinnipiac University Margin of error: ± 5.3% Sample size: 344	March 17–28, 2015	Hillary Clinton; 65%	Joe Biden; 11%	Elizabeth Warren 7% Bernie Sanders 3% Jim Webb 2% Martin O'Malley 0% Other 1% Wouldn't vote 2% Undecided 10%
Quinnipiac University Margin of error: ± 5.3% Sample size: 344	March 17–28, 2015	Joe Biden; 42%	Elizabeth Warren; 19%	Bernie Sanders 6% Jim Webb 3% Martin O'Malley 1% Other 2% Wouldn't vote 4% Undecided 22%
Public Policy Polling Margin of error: ± 5.1% Sample size: 371	March 19–22, 2015	Hillary Clinton; 58%	Joe Biden; 14%	Elizabeth Warren 10% Bernie Sanders 3% Martin O'Malley 2% Jim Webb 1% Other/Undecided 11%
Margin of error: ± 5% Sample size: 435	February 24–25, 2015	Hillary Clinton; 52%	Elizabeth Warren; 14%	Joe Biden 9% Martin O'Malley 2% Mark Warner 2% Jim Webb 2% Undecided 18%
Quinnipiac University Margin of error: ± 5.5% Sample size: 322	January 22 – February 1, 2015	Hillary Clinton; 61%	Joe Biden; 11%	Elizabeth Warren 9% Bernie Sanders 2% Martin O'Malley 1% Jim Webb 1% Other 2% Wouldn't vote 4% Undecided 10%
Quinnipiac University Margin of error: ± 5.5% Sample size: 322	January 22 – February 1, 2015	Joe Biden; 39%	Elizabeth Warren; 22%	Bernie Sanders 3% Martin O'Malley 2% Jim Webb 2% Other 4% Wouldn't vote 5% Undecided 23%

Polls in 2014

Poll source	Date	1st	2nd	Other
Quinnipiac University Margin of error: ± 4.6% Sample size: 457	July 17–21, 2014	Hillary Clinton; 67%	Joe Biden; 8%	Elizabeth Warren 8% Andrew Cuomo 1% Martin O'Malley 0% Brian Schweitzer 0% Other 1% Wouldn't vote 3% Undecided 11%
Public Policy Polling Margin of error: ± 6.2% Sample size: 251	June 6–9, 2014	Hillary Clinton; 66%	Elizabeth Warren; 8%	Joe Biden 7% Cory Booker 5% Andrew Cuomo 4% Mark Warner 1% Kirsten Gillibrand 0% Martin O'Malley 0% Brian Schweitzer 0% Someone else/Undecided 9%
Quinnipiac University Margin of error: ± 4.4% Sample size: 501	April 23–28, 2014	Hillary Clinton; 64%	Joe Biden; 11%	Elizabeth Warren 6% Andrew Cuomo 1% Martin O'Malley 1% Brian Schweitzer 1% Other 1% Wouldn't vote 3% Undecided 13%
Quinnipiac University Margin of error: ± 4.3% Sample size: 529	January 22–27, 2014	Hillary Clinton; 64%	Joe Biden; 9%	Elizabeth Warren 5% Andrew Cuomo 1% Martin O'Malley 1% Mark Warner 1% Other 2% Wouldn't vote 2% Undecided 16%

Polls in 2013

Poll source	Date	1st	2nd	Other
Quinnipiac University Margin of error: ± 4.2% Sample size: 544	November 12–17, 2013	Hillary Clinton; 70%	Joe Biden; 9%	Elizabeth Warren 4% Andrew Cuomo 2% Martin O'Malley 1% Mark Warner 1% Other 2% Wouldn't vote 2% Undecided 10%
Public Policy Polling Margin of error: ± 5.7% Sample size: 300	March 15–18, 2013	Hillary Clinton; 62%	Joe Biden; 12%	Andrew Cuomo 5% Elizabeth Warren 3% Martin O'Malley 1% Brian Schweitzer 1% Mark Warner 1% Kirsten Gillibrand 0% Deval Patrick 0% Someone Else/Undecided 14%
Public Policy Polling Margin of error: ± 4.9% Sample size: 401	January 11–13, 2013	Hillary Clinton; 65%	Joe Biden; 15%	Andrew Cuomo 4% Elizabeth Warren 4% Deval Patrick 1% Mark Warner 1% Kirsten Gillibrand 0% Martin O'Malley 0% Brian Schweitzer 0% Someone Else/Undecided 11%
Public Policy Polling Margin of error: ± 4.9% Sample size: 401	January 11–13, 2013	Andrew Cuomo; 22%	Elizabeth Warren; 15%	Deval Patrick 5% Martin O'Malley 4% Kirsten Gillibrand 3% Mark Warner 2% Brian Schweitzer 1% Someone Else/Undecided 48%

== Results ==
2016 Democratic Party's presidential nominating process in Florida – Summary of results –
Candidate	Popular vote		Estimated delegates		
Candidate	Count	Percentage	Pledged	Unpledged	Total
Hillary Clinton	1,101,414	64.44%	141	24	165
Bernie Sanders	568,839	33.28%	73	2	75
Martin O'Malley (withdrawn)	38,930	2.28%			
Uncommitted	—N/a		0	6	6
Total	1,709,183	100%	214	32	246

=== Results by district ===
Florida Democratic primary, March 15, 2016
District	Delegates	Votes Clinton	Votes Sanders	Votes Qualified	Clinton delegates	Sanders delegates
1	3	26987	18497	45484	2	1
2	6	50190	34073	84263	4	2
3	4	32070	27974	60044	2	2
4	4	33920	22765	56685	2	2
5	6	55855	18639	74494	4	2
6	5	37995	24443	62438	3	2
7	5	37410	26795	64205	3	2
8	5	39384	24376	63760	3	2
9	5	40609	19880	60489	3	2
10	5	38011	22213	60224	3	2
11	5	38061	21590	59651	3	2
12	5	35498	23172	58670	3	2
13	6	44121	29707	73828	4	2
14	6	49146	23617	72763	4	2
15	5	32793	20712	53505	3	2
16	6	43921	25856	69777	4	2
17	4	29899	17045	46944	3	1
18	6	42804	20620	63424	4	2
19	4	31958	17235	49193	3	1
20	7	61998	15761	77759	6	1
21	7	57723	22100	79823	5	2
22	6	49602	22209	71811	4	2
23	6	44510	19974	64484	4	2
24	8	59274	13893	73167	6	2
25	3	24897	9287	34184	2	1
26	4	32069	14148	46217	3	1
27	4	30709	12258	42967	3	1
Total	140	1101414	568839	1670253	93	47
PLEO	28	1101414	568839	1670253	18	10
At Large	46	1101414	568839	1670253	30	16
Gr. Total	214	1101414	568839	1670253	141	73
Total vote		64.44%	33.28%	1,709,183		
Source: Florida Department of State Division of Elections

=== Results by county ===
County	Clinton		Sanders	
County	#	%	#	%
Alachua	17,733	49.2%	17,590	48.8%
Baker	654	38.5%	805	47.4%
Bay	5,209	52.6%	4,131	41.7%
Bradford	1,056	48.7%	908	41.8%
Brevard	31,835	59.7%	20,083	37.7%
Broward	132,527	72.5%	48,330	26.4%
Calhoun	437	36.2%	545	45.2%
Charlotte	8,125	62.1%	4,634	35.4%
Citrus	6,863	56.3%	4,776	39.2%
Clay	5,345	57.1%	3,698	39.5%
Collier	12,712	66.1%	6,127	31.9%
Columbia	2,299	52.9%	1,676	38.6%
DeSoto	987	52.6%	726	38.7%
Dixie	409	40.2%	459	45.1%
Duval	58,632	67.2%	26,716	30.6%
Escambia	16,765	62.2%	9,318	34.6%
Flagler	6,152	65.8%	2,977	31.9%
Franklin	665	47.0%	647	45.7%
Gadsden	7,446	76.4%	1,944	20.0%
Gilchrist	428	37.5%	578	50.7%
Glades	387	49.9%	313	40.3%
Gulf	568	47.4%	520	43.4%
Hamilton	758	54.7%	479	34.6%
Hardee	529	52.7%	393	39.1%
Hendry	1,156	60.6%	647	33.9%
Hernando	8,882	59.6%	5,512	37.0%
Highlands	3,711	61.4%	2,054	34.0%
Hillsborough	68,936	62.8%	38,505	35.1%
Holmes	339	28.3%	619	51.7%
Indian River	6,897	62.4%	3,926	35.5%
Jackson	2,798	53.9%	1,840	35.5%
Jefferson	1,671	64.6%	762	29.5%
Lafayette	295	30.0%	501	50.9%
Lake	15,914	63.5%	8,465	33.8%
Lee	27,940	62.7%	15,624	35.0%
Leon	27,333	56.5%	19,866	41.1%
Levy	1,570	50.0%	1,354	43.1%
Liberty	316	38.0%	392	47.1%
Madison	1,542	62.4%	741	30.0%
Manatee	18,116	62.5%	10,165	35.1%
Marion	18,220	62.7%	9,892	34.1%
Martin	6,523	59.8%	4,101	37.6%
Miami-Dade	129,467	74.7%	42,009	24.3%
Monroe	4,830	55.3%	3,739	42.8%
Nassau	2,910	56.2%	2,060	39.8%
Okaloosa	4,559	52.0%	3,782	43.1%
Okeechobee	1,150	55.2%	784	37.6%
Orange	66,654	63.8%	36,639	35.1%
Osceola	16,512	68.2%	7,273	30.0%
Palm Beach	103,369	71.5%	39,314	27.2%
Pasco	21,760	58.3%	14,493	38.9%
Pinellas	63,699	60.3%	39,742	37.6%
Polk	29,328	63.0%	15,473	33.3%
Putnam	3,182	49.4%	2,747	42.7%
Santa Rosa	3,938	49.2%	3,602	45.0%
Sarasota	25,881	61.1%	15,776	37.3%
Seminole	22,069	58.3%	15,100	39.9%
St. Johns	9,734	57.0%	6,953	40.7%
St. Lucie	17,554	66.9%	8,091	30.8%
Sumter	7,022	68.1%	3,022	29.3%
Suwannee	1,475	42.2%	1,550	44.3%
Taylor	983	45.9%	907	42.4%
Union	336	36.7%	472	51.6%
Volusia	26,276	60.2%	16,170	37.1%
Wakulla	1,659	48.9%	1,424	42.0%
Walton	1,515	50.0%	1,361	44.9%
Washington	858	47.1%	781	42.9%
Total	1,101,414	64.4%	568,839	33.3%

== Analysis ==
Florida was generally viewed as a state Hillary Clinton would win, given her strong performance in previous contests with older voters (who comprised 65% of the Democratic electorate in Florida, the largest in any contest) and non-white voters (who made up 52% of the electorate). Clinton won the Florida Primary by 31 points, winning older voters by a margin of 71–26, and non-white voters by a margin of 74–25. Specifically, she won Hispanic/Latino voters by a margin of 68-32 (who made up 20% of the electorate), and African American voters 81-18 (who comprised 27% of the electorate). Clinton also won white voters by a narrower margin of 53–43. She won across all income and educational attainment levels.

In terms of religious affiliation, Clinton won Protestants in Florida 69-29 (36% of the electorate), Catholics 69-29 (22% of the electorate), and other religious affiliations 68-31 (Jews were 4% of the electorate but were unaccounted for in exit polls). Sanders won voters who identified as agnostic/atheist 56–31. In terms of political ideology, Clinton won liberals 59-41 and moderates/conservatives 70–26. And while Clinton won Democrats 71–28, Sanders won self-identified Independents 55–41.

Clinton won in Miami and along the Gold Coast 73–26, where there is a larger population of Hispanic/Latino voters who in South Florida are predominantly of Cuban or Nicaraguan descent. Clinton also won the Gulf Coast and Mid-Florida 64–35, the Tampa Bay Area 63–37, the Orlando area 62–34, and the Northern Panhandle which is whiter, more conservative and more rural by a smaller margin of 58–37.
