= 2016 Missouri Democratic presidential primary =

- March 15, 2016

Candidate	Hillary Clinton	Bernie Sanders
Home state	New York	Vermont
Delegate count	36	35
Popular vote	312,285	310,711
Percentage	49.61%	49.36%
- County results Clinton: 40-50% 50-60% 60-70% Sanders: 40-50% 50-60% 60-70% Tie: 40-50%

The 2016 Missouri Democratic presidential primary took place on March 15 in the U.S. state of Missouri as one of the Democratic Party's primaries ahead of the 2016 United States presidential election.

On the same day, the Democratic Party held primaries in Florida, Illinois, North Carolina and Ohio, while the Republican Party held primaries in the same five states, including their own Missouri primary, plus the Northern Mariana Islands.

== Opinion polling ==
Poll source	Date	1st	2nd	3rd	Other
Official Primary results	March 15, 2016	Hillary Clinton; 49.6%	Bernie Sanders; 49.4%		Others / Uncommitted; 1.0%
Public Policy Polling Margin of error: ± 3.4% Sample size: 839	March 11–12, 2016	Bernie Sanders; 47%	Hillary Clinton; 46%		Others / Undecided; 7%
RABA Research Margin of error: ± 4% Sample size: 670	March 8–10, 2016	Hillary Clinton; 44%	Bernie Sanders; 40%		Others / Undecided; 16%
Fort Hayes State University Margin of error: ± 8% Sample size: 145	March 3–10, 2016	Hillary Clinton; 47%	Bernie Sanders; 40%		Others / Undecided 13%
Public Policy Polling Margin of error: 5.2% Sample size: 352	August 7–9, 2015	Hillary Clinton; 53%	Bernie Sanders; 25%	Martin O'Malley; 5%	Jim Webb 5%, Lincoln Chafee 1%, Not sure 12%

== Results ==
Clinton went into election night in Missouri down to Senator Sanders in the polls. Throughout the evening Sanders maintained a lead over Clinton. However St. Louis County and Jackson County, home of a large section of Kansas City, came in late and it was just enough to push Clinton over the finish line. Senator Sanders refused to request a recount citing concerns over wasting taxpayer dollars.

Missouri Democratic primary, March 15, 2016
Candidate	Popular vote		Estimated delegates		
Candidate	Count	Percentage	Pledged	Unpledged	Total
Hillary Clinton	312,285	49.61%	36	11	47
Bernie Sanders	310,711	49.36%	35	2	37
Henry Hewes	650	0.10%			
Martin O'Malley (withdrawn)	442	0.07%			
Jon Adams	433	0.07%			
Rocky De La Fuente	345	0.05%			
Willie Wilson	307	0.05%			
Keith Russell Judd	288	0.05%			
John Wolfe Jr.	247	0.04%			
Uncommitted	3,717	0.59%	0	0	0
Total	629,425	100%	71	13	84

State of Missouri Democratic primary, March 15, 2016
District	Delegates	Votes Clinton	Votes Sanders	Votes Qualified	Clinton delegates	Sanders delegates
1	10	85656	59567	145223	6	4
2	6	46785	49661	96446	3	3
3	5	28983	35664	64647	2	3
4	5	26178	33428	59606	2	3
5	7	51696	45974	97670	4	3
6	5	28786	32129	60915	2	3
7	4	21574	31389	52963	2	2
8	5	20944	21259	42203	2	3
Total	47	310,602	309,071	619,673	23	24
PLEO	9	310,602	309,071	619,673	5	4
At Large	15	310,602	309,071	619,673	8	7
Gr. Total	71	310,602	309,071	619,673	36	35
Total vote	626,075	49.61%	49.37%			
Source: Missouri Secretary of State Jason Kander statewide results and Missouri Secretary of State Jason Kander District results

=== Results by county ===
County	Clinton	%	Sanders	%	Others	%	Totals	TEV	TO%
Adair	799	40.7%	1,153	58.8%				15,231	
Andrew	498	39.9%	728	58.4%				12,188	
Atchison	141	44.5%	173	54.6%				3,815	
Audrain	749	49.6%	728	48.2%					
Barry	796	47.0%	874	51.6%					
Barton	205	48.1%	214	50.2%					
Bates	518	43.5%	632	53.1%					
Benton	669	53.3%	567	45.2%					
Bollinger	242	53.8%	203	45.1%					
Boone	9,628	38.7%	15,076	60.6%					
Buchanan	3,443	44.5%	4,148	53.7%					
Butler	889	52.7%	766	45.4%					
Caldwell	244	43.2%	314	55.6%					
Callaway	1,378	44.5%	1,678	54.2%					
Camden	1,388	48.9%	1,419	49.9%					
Cape Girardeau	2,076	46.6%	2,335	52.4%					
Carroll	233	43.2%	255	50.7%					
Carter	138	48.6%	142	50.0%					
Cass	3,765	46.8%	4,185	52.1%					
Cedar	332	47.0%	361	51.1%					
Chariton	321	52.1%	274	44.5%					
Christian	2,146	40.8%	3,073	58.4%					
Clark	202	51.4%	178	45.3%					
Clay	10,630	45.5%	12,542	53.7%					
Clinton	765	46.2%	852	51.4%					
Cole	2,798	45.3%	3,303	53.5%					
Cooper	516	50.1%	501	48.6%					
Crawford	522	41.2%	712	56.2%					
Dade	201	48.1%	213	51.0%					
Dallas	397	42.9%	515	55.7%					
Daviess	239	51.0%	221	47.1%					
DeKalb	221	39.0%	328	57.8%					
Dent	327	40.5%	449	55.6%					
Douglas	268	40.5%	384	58.1%					
Dunklin	724	60.9%	448	37.7%					
Franklin	3,701	42.9%	4,784	55.4%					
Gasconade	401	43.8%	507	55.3%					
Gentry	171	48.0%	176	49.4%					
Greene	10,910	38.3%	17,403	61.1%					
Grundy	219	44.6%	262	53.4%					
Harrison	158	48.5%	163	50.0%					
Henry	780	51.7%	696	46.1%					
Hickory	73	53.7%	60	44.1%					
Holt	128	52.2%	110	44.9%					
Howard	413	48.8%	408	48.2%					
Howell	833	40.2%	1,209	58.4%					
Iron	349	43.8%	426	53.5%					
Jackson	48,860	52.9%	42,823	46.4%					
Jasper	2,289	37.1%	3,826	62.0%					
Jefferson	9,637	44.2%	11,830	54.3%					
Johnson	1,473	42.5%	1,944	56.2%					
Knox	134	56.8%	94	39.8%					
Laclede	737	43.6%	927	54.8%					
Lafayette	1,173	46.2%	1,324	52.2%					
Lawrence	872	45.3%	1,028	53.5%					
Lewis	239	48.3%	239	48.3%					
Lincoln	1,561	43.1%	1,976	54.6%					
Linn	436	50.5%	409	47.3%					
Livingston	397	48.5%	398	48.6%					
Macon	421	43.7%	505	52.4%					
Madison	346	49.4%	334	47.6%					
Maries	305	50.2%	291	47.9%					
Marion	925	54.7%	707	41.8%					
McDonald	364	47.6%	385	50.3%					
Mercer	69	51.9%	63	47.4%					
Miller	432	46.5%	480	51.7%					
Mississippi	486	67.2%	209	28.9%					
Moniteau	340	44.6%	409	53.7%					
Monroe	252	50.9%	226	45.7%					
Montgomery	330	49.4%	324	48.5%					
Morgan	554	51.5%	506	47.1%					
New Madrid	691	64.2%	360	33.5%					
Newton	1,240	43.9%	1,553	55.0%					
Nodaway	616	41.6%	831	56.1%					
Oregon	319	53.0%	271	45.0%					
Osage	314	47.7%	326	49.5%					
Ozark	217	42.1%	293	56.8%					
Pemiscot	602	69.4%	250	28.8%					
Perry	436	49.3%	437	49.4%					
Pettis	1,265	44.8%	1,509	53.5%					
Phelps	1,137	38.4%	1,744	58.9%					
Pike	661	57.0%	475	41.0%					
Platte	4,645	47.1%	5,142	52.1%					
Polk	744	46.1%	851	52.7%					
Pulaski	860	44.6%	1,020	52.8%					
Putnam	102	46.8%	108	49.5%					
Ralls	415	54.5%	311	40.9%					
Randolph	647	44.9%	750	52.0%					
Ray	945	48.2%	968	49.5%					
Reynolds	230	47.1%	228	46.7%					
Ripley	259	49.1%	250	47.3%					
Saline	910	51.4%	805	45.5%					
Schuyler	124	49.2%	119	47.2%					
Scotland	108	44.1%	134	54.7%					
Scott	1,067	55.0%	834	43.0%					
Shannon	317	50.6%	291	46.5%					
Shelby	240	51.1%	200	42.6%					
St. Charles	17,805	44.8%	21,593	54.3%					
St. Clair	340	49.9%	320	47.0%					
St. Francois	1,939	45.3%	2,267	53.0%					
St. Louis (City)	34,458	55.0%	27,748	44.3%					
St. Louis (County)	89,373	55.3%	71,134	44.0%					
Ste. Genevieve	842	50.3%	798	47.6%					
Stoddard	674	56.6%	489	41.1%					
Stone	806	46.9%	885	51.5%					
Sullivan	177	59.8%	112	37.8%					
Taney	1,199	46.2%	1,373	52.9%					
Texas	603	46.3%	666	51.2%					
Vernon	490	47.8%	518	50.5%					
Warren	986	44.0%	1,222	54.5%					
Washington	754	51.4%	664	45.3%					
Wayne	393	57.8%	264	38.8%					
Webster	940	44.0%	1,170	54.8%					
Worth	59	41.5%	76	53.5%					
Wright	402	50.5%	385	48.4%					
Total	310,602	49.6%	309,071	49.4%	6,429				

== Analysis ==
Hillary Clinton, having narrowly lost the Missouri primary to Barack Obama eight years prior, managed a slim 0.2-percentage-point-victory over an increasingly popular insurgent Bernie Sanders in 2016. With Sanders winning men 56-44, voters under the age of 45 67-32, and white voters 54-45, Clinton won among women 54-44, older voters 62-37, and African American voters 67-32.

Sanders won among voters who made less than $50k and $100k per year, with Clinton winning more affluent voters. And while Sanders won 67-33 among self-identified Independents who made up 24% of the electorate, Clinton won 55-44 among the 74% of voters who identified as Democrats. While Sanders won among liberals 53-46, Clinton won moderates and conservatives 55-44. Sanders was able to win 54-45 among union households, a key voting bloc in the industrial Midwest, and he won 53-46 among those who believe trade with other countries takes away U.S. jobs; trade deals championed by Bill and Hillary Clinton have not always gone over well in the industrial Rust Belt. In terms of each voters' family financial situation, voters who were "getting ahead" or "holding steady" opted for Clinton, while those who felt they were "falling behind" overwhelmingly favored Sanders.

Clinton won a large victory in St. Louis City and St. Louis County (she won 55-44 according to exit polls, likely thanks to her ardent African American support), and she also managed a 51-48 victory in Kansas City on the western side of the state. Sanders, meanwhile, won victories in Columbia and Springfield, keeping the race close statewide, and won in the largely white, rural and more conservative counties, including areas of Northwestern Missouri bordering Kansas and Nebraska, and Southwestern Missouri bordering Oklahoma. All three neighboring states are Great Plains states that Sanders won earlier in March.

== See also ==
- 2016 Missouri Republican presidential primary
