= 2016 North Carolina Democratic presidential primary =

- March 15, 2016

Candidate	Hillary Clinton	Bernie Sanders
Home state	New York	Vermont
Delegate count	60	47
Popular vote	622,915	467,018
Percentage	54.50%	40.86%
- Results by county Clinton: 40-50% 50-60% 60-70% 70-80% Sanders: 40-50% 50-60% 60-70%

The 2016 North Carolina Democratic presidential primary took place on March 15 in the U.S. state of North Carolina as one of the Democratic Party's primaries ahead of the 2016 presidential election.

On the same day, the Democratic Party held primaries in Florida, Illinois, Missouri, and Ohio, while the Republican Party held primaries in the same five states, including their own North Carolina primary, plus the Northern Mariana Islands.

Clinton easily won the primary, though Sanders did outperform polls. Clinton had the in-state backing of Rep. G.K. Butterfield, the chairman of the Congressional Black Caucus, as well as Reps. Alma Adams and David Price. Sanders, meanwhile, did not have any endorsements from members of Congress representing the state. Clinton won 80% of African Americans.

== Opinion polling ==
Poll source	Date	1st	2nd	3rd	Other
Primary results	March 15, 2016	Hillary Clinton; 54.5%	Bernie Sanders; 40.9%		Others / Uncommitted; 4.6%
Public Policy Polling Margin of error: ± 3.6% Sample size: 747	March 11–13, 2016	Hillary Clinton; 56%	Bernie Sanders; 37%		Others / Undecided; 7%
High Point University/SurveyUSA Margin of error: ± 3.8% Sample size: 669	March 9–10, 2016	Hillary Clinton; 58%	Bernie Sanders; 34%		Others / Undecided; 8%
WRAL/SurveyUSA Margin of error: ± 3.8% Sample size: 687	March 4–7, 2016	Hillary Clinton; 57%	Bernie Sanders; 34%		Others / Undecided; 9%
Civitas Margin of error: ± 4.4% Sample size: 500	March 3–7, 2016	Hillary Clinton; 57%	Bernie Sanders; 28%		Others / Undecided; 15%
Elon University Margin of error: ± 3.6% Sample size: 728	February 15–17, 2016	Hillary Clinton; 47%	Bernie Sanders; 37%		Others / Undecided 16%
SurveyUSA Margin of error: ± 4.7% Sample size: 449	February 14–16, 2016	Hillary Clinton; 51%	Bernie Sanders; 36%		No Preference 4%, Undecided 9%
Public Policy Polling Margin of error: ± 4.1; Sample size: 575	February 14–16, 2016	Hillary Clinton; 52%	Bernie Sanders; 35%		Others / Undecided; 13%
High Point Margin of error: ± 4.5% Sample size: 478	January 30 – February 4, 2016	Hillary Clinton; 55%	Bernie Sanders; 29%	Martin O'Malley; 1%	Not Sure 15%
Public Policy Polling Margin of error: ± 4.6% Sample size: 461	January 18–19, 2016	Hillary Clinton; 59%	Bernie Sanders; 26%	Martin O'Malley; 5%	Not Sure 10%
Civitas Margin of error: ± 4.4% Sample size: 500	January 13–16, 2016	Hillary Clinton; 53%	Bernie Sanders; 28%	Martin O'Malley; 2%	Undecided 17%

Polls in 2015

Poll source	Date	1st	2nd	3rd	Other
Public Policy Polling Margin of error: ± 2.8% Sample size: 555	December 5–7, 2015	Hillary Clinton; 60%	Bernie Sanders; 21%	Martin O'Malley; 10%	Not Sure 9%
Elon University Margin of error: ± 4.32% Sample size: 514	October 29 – November 2, 2015	Hillary Clinton; 57%	Bernie Sanders; 24%	Martin O'Malley; 3%	Other 2% Undecided/DK 13% Refused 0.5%
Public Policy Polling Margin of error: ± 4.8% Sample size: 421	October 23–25, 2015	Hillary Clinton; 61%	Bernie Sanders; 24%	Martin O'Malley; 5%	Lawrence Lessig; 2%
Public Policy Polling Margin of error: ± 4.0% Sample size: 605	September 24–27, 2015	Hillary Clinton; 37%	Joe Biden; 30%	Bernie; Sanders; 17%	Jim Webb 3%, Lincoln Chafee 2%, Martin O'Malley 1%, Lawrence Lessig 0%, Not sure 10%
Elon University Margin of error: ± 5% Sample size: 427	September 17–21, 2015	Hillary Clinton; 53.40%	Bernie Sanders; 23.00%	Jim Webb; 1.60%	Lincoln Chafee 0.70%, Lawrence Lessig 0.70%, Martin O'Malley 0.20%, Other 2.10%, Undecided/Don't know 17.10%, Refuse 1.20%
Public Policy Polling Margin of error: ± 4.5% Sample size: 477	August 12–16, 2015	Hillary Clinton; 55%	Bernie Sanders; 19%	Jim Webb; 5%	Lincoln Chafee 2%, Martin O'Malley 2%, Lawrence Lessig 1%
Public Policy Polling Margin of error: ± 5.8% Sample size: 286	July 2–6, 2015	Hillary Clinton; 55%	Bernie Sanders; 20%	Jim Webb; 7%	Lincoln Chafee 4%, Martin O'Malley 4%, Someone else/Undecided 11%
Public Policy Polling Margin of error: ± 5.9% Sample size: 274	May 28–31, 2015	Hillary Clinton; 62%	Bernie Sanders; 14%	Jim Webb; 5%	Lincoln Chafee 4%, Martin O'Malley 4%, Someone else/Undecided 12%
Survey USA Margin of error: ± 4.7% Sample size: 442	April 22–27, 2015	Hillary Clinton; 56%	Elizabeth Warren; 11%	Joe Biden; 8%	Martin O'Malley 3%, Bernie Sanders 3%, Jim Webb 3%, Other/Undecided 16%
Public Policy Polling Margin of error: ± 5.1% Sample size: 370	April 2–5, 2015	Hillary Clinton; 53%	Joe Biden; 13%	Elizabeth Warren; 11%	Martin O'Malley 5%, Jim Webb 3%, Bernie Sanders 2%, Someone else/Undecided 12%
Civitas Institute Margin of error: ± 5% Sample size: 400	March 20–23, 2015	Hillary Clinton; 53%	Elizabeth Warren; 19%	Joe Biden; 9%	Bernie Sanders 5%, Martin O'Malley 2%, Other/Undecided 13%
Public Policy Polling Margin of error: ± 4.9% Sample size: 401	February 24–26, 2015	Hillary Clinton; 56%	Elizabeth Warren; 13%	Joe Biden; 11%	Martin O'Malley 3%, Jim Webb 3%, Bernie Sanders 1%, Someone else/Undecided 12%
Public Policy Polling Margin of error: ± 5% Sample size: 385	January 29–31, 2015	Hillary Clinton; 54%	Joe Biden; 18%	Elizabeth Warren; 12%	Bernie Sanders 3%, Martin O'Malley 2%, Jim Webb 2%, Someone else/Not sure 10%

Polls in 2014

Poll source	Date	1st	2nd	3rd	Other
Public Policy Polling Margin of error: ± 5% Sample size: 381	December 4–7, 2014	Hillary Clinton; 52%	Joe Biden; 18%	Elizabeth Warren; 7%	Bernie Sanders 5%, Andrew Cuomo 4%, Jim Webb 2%, Martin O'Malley 1%, Brian Schweitzer 0%, Someone else/Not sure 10%
Suffolk Margin of error: ± ?% Sample size: 254	August 16–19, 2014	Hillary Clinton; 57.09%	Joe Biden; 14.96%	Elizabeth Warren; 9.06%	Martin O'Malley 2.76%, Andrew Cuomo 1.97%, Undecided 11.42%, Refused 2.76%
Civitas Institute Margin of error: ± ?% Sample size: 336	July 28–29, 2014	Hillary Clinton; 40%	Elizabeth Warren; 12%	Joe Biden; 9%	Andrew Cuomo 3%, Bernie Sanders 2%, Howard Dean 1%, Jim Webb 1%, Amy Klobuchar 0%, Martin O'Malley 0%, Won't vote in Democratic primary 15%, Undecided 14%, Refused 3%, Other 0%

== Results ==
North Carolina Democratic primary, March 15, 2016
Candidate	Popular vote		Estimated delegates		
Candidate	Count	Percentage	Pledged	Unpledged	Total
Hillary Clinton	622,915	54.50%	60	8	68
Bernie Sanders	467,018	40.86%	47	2	49
Martin O'Malley (withdrawn)	12,122	1.06%			
Rocky De La Fuente	3,376	0.30%			
No preference	37,485	3.28%			
Uncommitted	—N/a			3	3
Total	1,142,916	100%	107	13	120

=== Results by county ===
County	Clinton	Votes	Sanders	Votes
Alamance	53.7%	7,374	41.3%	5,755
Alexander	45.8%	1,148	44.8%	1,123
Alleghany	44.2%	563	44.8%	571
Anson	66.1%	2,307	26.2%	914
Ashe	46.4%	1,219	45.9%	1,205
Avery	41.4%	326	53.9%	425
Beaufort	55.6%	2,934	34.9%	1,840
Bertie	69.5%	2,065	25.4%	756
Bladen	59.6%	3,442	26.4%	1,524
Brunswick	60.1%	7,192	35.5%	4,252
Buncombe	35.4%	17,604	62.1%	30,913
Burke	46.1%	3,511	45.4%	3,460
Cabarrus	51.7%	8,096	44.3%	6,931
Caldwell	47.0%	2,156	45.9%	2,108
Camden	54.2%	468	34.5%	298
Carteret	48.5%	2,946	44.4%	2,694
Caswell	59.8%	1,701	31.1%	885
Catawba	51.2%	5,310	44.0%	4,561
Chatham	55.0%	7,406	40.9%	5,510
Cherokee	43.9%	1,024	43.7%	1,021
Chowan	61.8%	974	29.8%	470
Clay	52.8%	487	38.5%	355
Cleveland	55.9%	4,880	35.6%	3,104
Columbus	56.3%	3,628	31.1%	2,002
Craven	58.1%	5,187	35.7%	3,184
Cumberland	63.9%	22,744	31.0%	11,052
Currituck	47.8%	780	43.5%	710
Dare	42.5%	2,003	48.9%	2,307
Davidson	50.3%	4,489	43.5%	3,878
Davie	54.0%	1,377	40.4%	1,031
Duplin	61.2%	3,036	29.2%	1,450
Durham	57.5%	35,845	41.0%	25,584
Edgecombe	70.8%	6,411	22.7%	2,058
Forsyth	58.0%	24,446	39.8%	16,779
Franklin	59.4%	4,951	34.3%	2,858
Gaston	54.1%	7,697	40.3%	5,738
Gates	61.7%	749	29.3%	356
Graham	44.3%	321	40.7%	295
Granville	58.8%	4,693	34.0%	2,715
Greene	58.7%	1,643	29.4%	822
Guilford	56.0%	37,880	41.7%	28,204
Halifax	66.7%	6,224	24.8%	2,313
Harnett	55.1%	4,655	36.8%	3,111
Haywood	44.5%	3,748	46.0%	3,873
Henderson	47.0%	4,811	50.1%	5,129
Hertford	67.5%	2,926	22.2%	961
Hoke	59.7%	3,528	31.1%	1,837
Hyde	48.0%	459	40.5%	388
Iredell	50.9%	5,888	43.2%	4,998
Jackson	38.1%	2,022	57.0%	3,021
Johnston	52.1%	7,992	40.5%	6,223
Jones	58.0%	910	32.0%	501
Lee	54.6%	3,224	38.1%	2,248
Lenoir	64.1%	4,731	26.4%	1,947
Lincoln	51.3%	2,812	41.8%	2,291
Macon	47.9%	1,548	44.2%	1,428
Madison	34.5%	1,201	58.7%	2,044
Martin	61.8%	2,469	27.4%	1,097
McDowell	40.9%	1,353	49.0%	1,622
Mecklenburg	60.3%	71,265	38.3%	45,224
Mitchell	40.4%	314	57.9%	450
Montgomery	54.9%	1,366	35.5%	885
Moore	58.8%	4,679	37.0%	2,948
Nash	65.8%	8,554	28.2%	3,664
New Hanover	48.4%	12,240	48.6%	12,276
Northampton	68.4%	3,195	22.9%	1,067
Onslow	54.2%	4,560	38.2%	3,213
Orange	48.4%	17,546	49.9%	18,096
Pamlico	53.0%	922	38.9%	676
Pasquotank	65.2%	2,471	29.8%	1,128
Pender	56.4%	2,880	36.8%	1,880
Perquimans	51.4%	711	34.8%	481
Person	51.0%	2,954	37.1%	2,150
Pitt	57.0%	11,856	36.3%	7,548
Polk	47.7%	1,099	48.7%	1,123
Randolph	46.6%	2,969	45.8%	2,914
Richmond	57.1%	2,941	31.0%	1,595
Robeson	51.0%	8,457	31.4%	5,206
Rockingham	54.4%	4,464	36.5%	3,000
Rowan	52.7%	5,031	41.6%	3,969
Rutherford	46.0%	2,382	44.5%	2,306
Sampson	65.7%	3,790	26.9%	1,554
Scotland	63.0%	2,671	26.9%	1,142
Stanly	49.1%	2,153	41.4%	1,813
Stokes	47.8%	1,433	44.0%	1,319
Surry	47.5%	2,380	44.0%	2,204
Swain	41.0%	666	51.2%	831
Transylvania	45.8%	1,794	49.9%	1,954
Tyrrell	49.3%	266	36.5%	197
Union	55.8%	7,630	40.6%	5,547
Vance	64.0%	4,561	28.0%	1,999
Wake	53.4%	77,927	44.8%	65,380
Warren	70.0%	2,827	24.5%	988
Washington	62.1%	1,374	27.0%	597
Watauga	29.6%	2,514	68.5%	5,811
Wayne	62.5%	7,546	29.5%	3,564
Wilkes	50.4%	2,107	42.6%	1,783
Wilson	64.2%	6,408	29.4%	2,935
Yadkin	48.0%	832	45.2%	783
Yancey	40.5%	1,134	49.5%	1,386
Total	54.6%	616,383	40.8%	460,316

== Analysis ==
After North Carolina had sealed the deal on Clinton's dying 2008 presidential effort eight years prior by handing a double-digit win to Barack Obama, Hillary Clinton managed a commanding 13-percentage-point-victory in North Carolina over Bernie Sanders in 2016. Clinton won both men 48-47, and women 59-37; she won both married and unmarried women voters in the state. While Sanders won 59–40 with younger voters, and 52-43 with white voters, Clinton won 64–30 with older voters and 80-19 with African American voters. Clinton swept all educational attainment levels and all income levels except those who made between $50k and $100k per year. Clinton won Democrats 65-34, but lost Independents 58-34 to Sanders. Clinton won among liberals, moderates, and conservatives in the Old North State.

Clinton won in urban, Suburban, and rural areas of the state. She won Raleigh-Durham 55-42, the Charlotte area 60-39, Piedmont and central North Carolina 60-31, and Eastern North Carolina 58-34. Sanders performed strongly in Western North Carolina, which is whiter, conservative, more rural and considered to be part of Appalachia, winning 52–44. Outside of the western part of the state, Sanders won only three counties: New Hanover, home to Wilmington; the state's eighth most populated city, Dare, and Orange, the latter of which is home to the University of North Carolina at Chapel Hill.
