= 2016 Northern Mariana Islands Republican presidential caucuses =

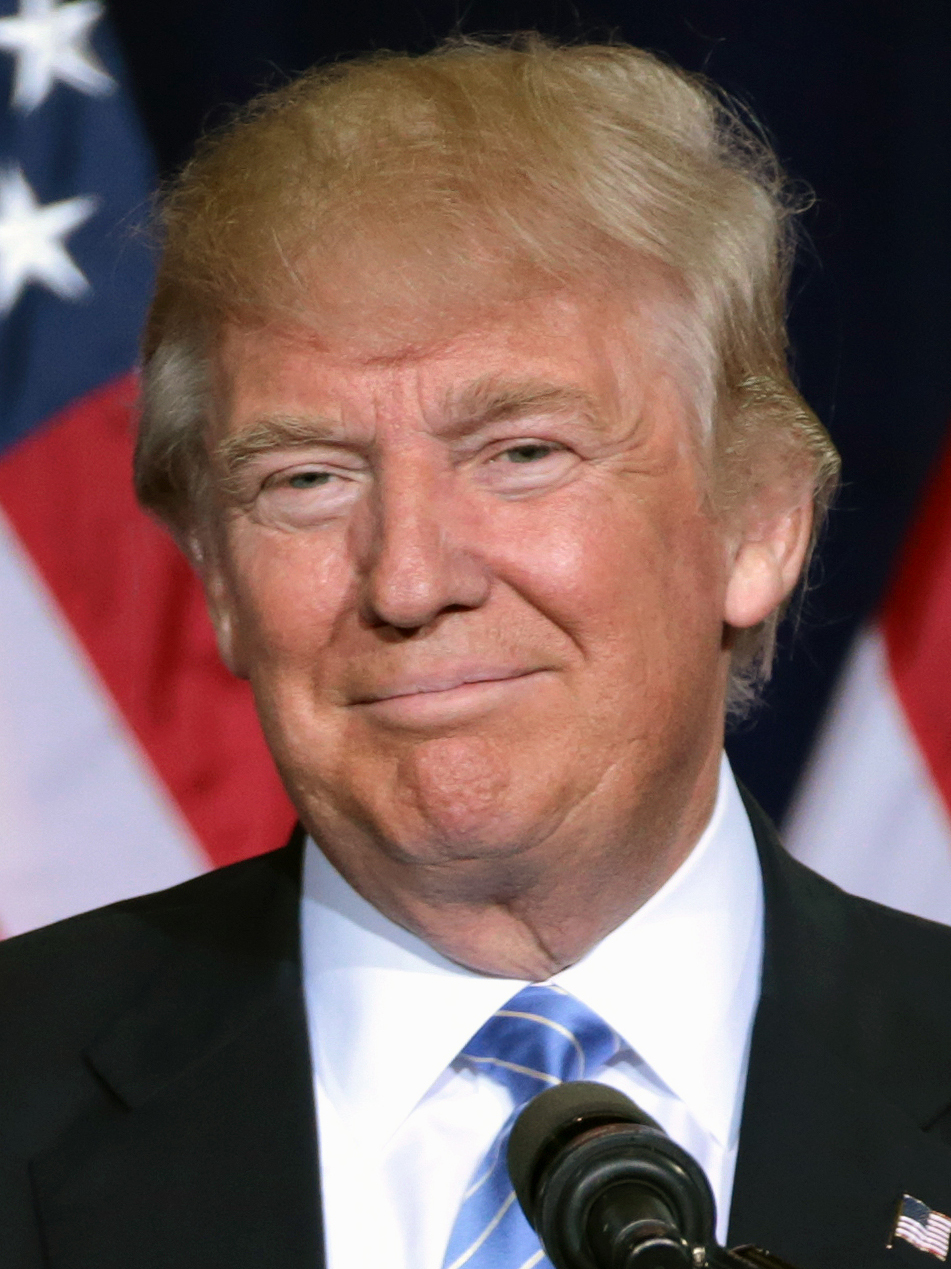

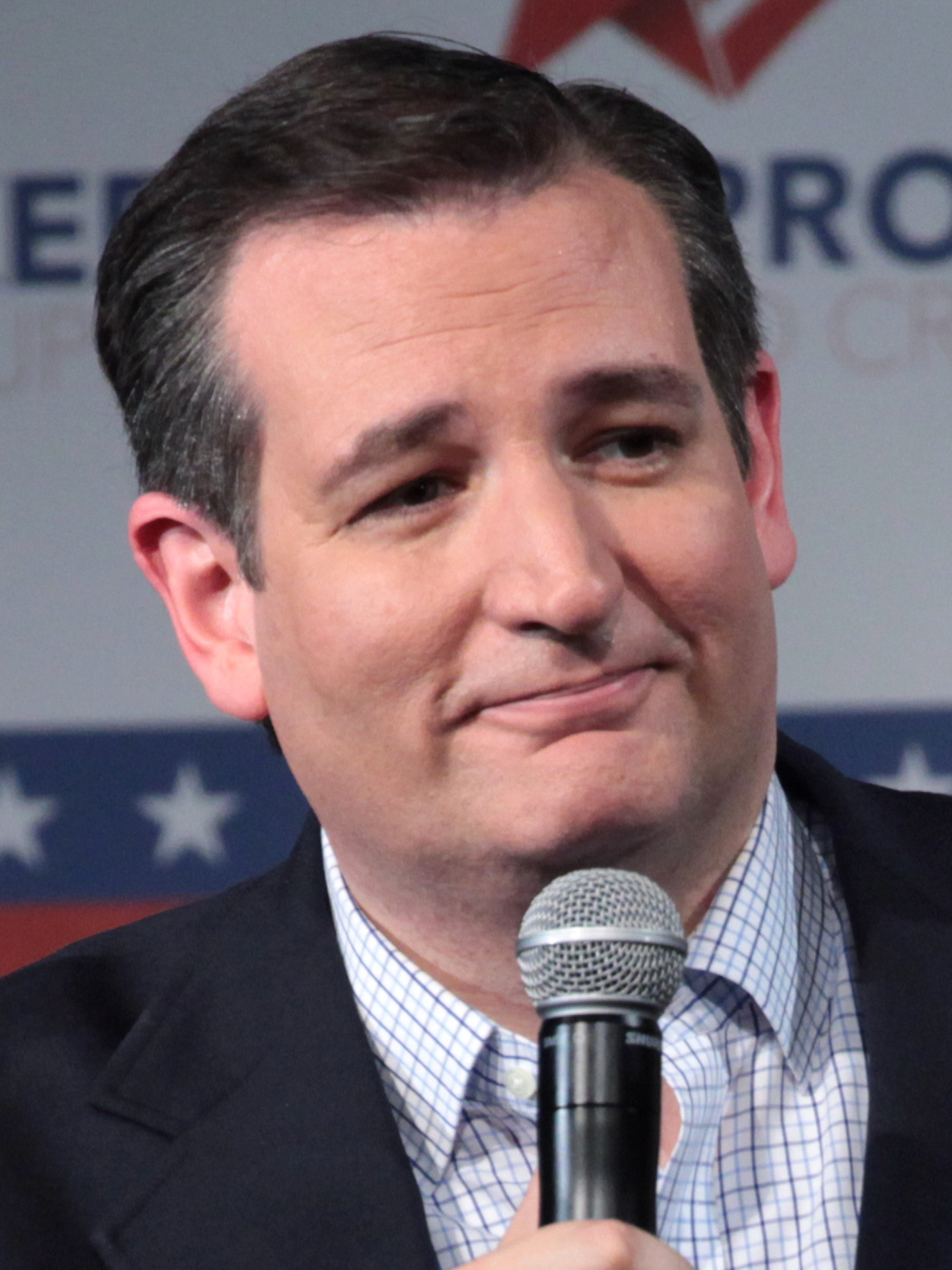
Candidate	Donald Trump	Ted Cruz
Home state	New York	Texas
Delegate count	6	0
Popular vote	343	113
Percentage	72.82%	23.99%

The Northern Mariana Islands Republican Caucuses took place on March 15, 2016, also dubbed "Super Tuesday II." Caucus attendees sent 9 delegates to the Republican National Convention in Cleveland, Ohio on behalf of the Northern Mariana Islands.

== Procedure ==
The caucus selected 6 of the 9 delegates to attend the RNC along with six alternatives, all of whom were previously designated by a caucus subcommittee. Bo Palacios, National Committeeman, Vicky Villagomez, the National Committeewoman, and James Ada, the Chairman of the CNMI Republican Party comprised the other three delegates, all of whom were expected to vote for the winning candidate alongside the 6 chosen delegates. These delegates received an at-large designation and were bound for the first ballot at the RNC but free to vote individually in any successive ballots. In the chance that the chosen candidate withdrew prior to the RNC, the delegates decided which candidate to support as a group.

== Polling ==
Polling sites were spread between the islands of Saipan, Tinian, and Rota and the meetings were conducted between 6:30 and 8 p.m. on the evening of March 15. Participation in the caucus was limited to official CNMI Republican Party members with a valid photo ID or voter registration card.

== Representation and endorsement ==
Three candidates, Ben Carson, Jeb Bush, and Donald Trump sent representatives to present their respective platform, marking the second commonwealth Republican caucus in history to receive candidate representatives. Newly appointed Governor Ralph Torres publicly backed Donald Trump as he stated that "He is the only candidate that I believe would give the attention we need in the White House."

== Results ==
The results of the voting period were decisive, handing Donald Trump 72.82% of the vote at 343 votes and transferring all 9 delegates to his cause at the Republican National Convention. Rounding out the voting totals was Ted Cruz at 23.99%, or 113 votes, John Kasich with 10 votes, and Marco Rubio with 5 votes out of the 471 votes cast.

Northern Mariana Islands Republican Caucuses, 2016
Candidate	Votes	Percentages	Delegates
Donald Trump	343	72.82%	6
Ted Cruz	113	23.99%	0
John Kasich	10	2.13%	0
Marco Rubio	5	1.06%	0
Unprojected Delegates			3
Total	471	100%	9

== See also ==
- 2016 Republican Party presidential primaries
- 2016 Republican Party presidential debates and forums
- Results of the 2016 Republican Party presidential primaries
