= 2016 Illinois Democratic presidential primary =

- March 15, 2016

182 delegates (156 pledged, 26 unpledged) to the Democratic National Convention

Candidate	Hillary Clinton	Bernie Sanders
Home state	New York	Vermont
Delegate count	79	77
Popular vote	1,039,555	999,494
Percentage	50.56%	48.61%
- Results by county Clinton: 40-50% 50-60% 60-70% Sanders: 40-50% 50-60% 60-70%

The 2016 Illinois Democratic presidential primary took place on March 15 in the U.S. state of Illinois as one of the 2016 Democratic Party presidential primaries ahead of the 2016 presidential election.

On the same day, the Democratic Party held primaries in Florida, Missouri, North Carolina and Ohio, while the Republican Party held primaries in the same five states, including their own Illinois primary, plus the Northern Mariana Islands.

Clinton's win came thanks to African American neighborhoods of Chicago. Precinct-level results showed a close race with Latino voters: with Sanders performing in Mexican American neighborhoods and Clinton in Puerto Rican neighborhoods.

Sanders dominated the suburban and rural vote.

== Opinion polling ==
Poll source	Date	1st	2nd	Other
Primary results	March 15, 2016	Hillary Clinton; 50.6%	Bernie Sanders; 48.6%	Others; 0.8%
McKeon & Associates Margin of error: ± 4.1% Sample size: 428	March 12, 2016	Hillary Clinton; 31%	Bernie Sanders; 30%	Others / Undecided 39%
Public Policy Polling Margin of error: ± 3.9% Sample size: 627	March 11–12, 2016	Hillary Clinton; 48%	Bernie Sanders; 45%	Others / Undecided 7%
CBS News/YouGov Margin of error: ± 5.5% Sample size: 756	March 9–11, 2016	Bernie Sanders; 48%	Hillary Clinton; 46%	Others / Undecided 6%
NBC News/Wall Street Journal/Marist Margin of error: ± 4.3% Sample size: 529	March 4–10, 2016	Hillary Clinton; 51%	Bernie Sanders; 45%	Others / Undecided 4%
We Ask America Margin of error: ± 3.11% Sample size: 994	March 7–8, 2016	Hillary Clinton; 62%	Bernie Sanders; 25%	Others / Undecided 13%
Chicago Tribune Margin of error: ±4.1% Sample size: 600	March 2–6, 2016	Hillary Clinton; 67%	Bernie Sanders; 25%	Others / Undecided 8%
We Ask America Margin of error: ± 3.0; Sample size: 1,116	February 24, 2016	Hillary Clinton; 57%	Bernie Sanders; 28%	Others / Undecided 15%
The Simon Poll/SIU Margin of error: ± 5.6; Sample size: 306	February 15–20, 2016	Hillary Clinton; 51%	Bernie Sanders; 32%	Others / Undecided 17%
The Illinois Observer Margin of error: ± 4.23; Sample size: 560	February 11, 2016	Hillary Clinton; 58%	Bernie Sanders; 25%	Others / Undecided 18%
Public Policy Polling Margin of error: ± 4.9% Sample size: 409	July 20–21, 2015	Hillary Clinton; 60%	Bernie Sanders; 23%	Others / Undecided 17%

== Results ==
2016 Illinois Democratic Presidential Primary Results
Party	Candidate	Votes	Percentage	Delegates
Democratic	Hillary Rodham Clinton	1,039,055	50.56%	79
Democratic	Bernard Sanders	999,494	48.61%	77
Democratic	Willie Wilson	6,565	0.32%	0
Democratic	Martin Joseph O'Malley	6,197	0.30%	0
Democratic	Lawrence Cohen	2,407	0.12%	0
Democratic	Rocky De La Fuente	1,802	0.09%	0
Democratic	Others	27	0.00%	0
Totals		2,056,047	100.00%	156
Voter turnout		%		—

=== Results by county ===
County	Clinton	Votes	Sanders	Votes
Adams	50.78%	1,784	47.08%	1,654
Alexander	59.97%	770	33.80%	434
Bond	44.94%	719	53.44%	855
Boone	41.11%	1,958	58.30%	2,777
Brown	49.23%	160	48.00%	156
Bureau	44.44%	1,523	54.27%	1,860
Calhoun	44.92%	447	50.65%	504
Carroll	48.75%	625	50.08%	642
Cass	46.93%	504	50.19%	539
Champaign	33.24%	10,721	66.48%	21,440
Christian	46.86%	1,401	51.14%	1,529
Clark	44.75%	562	52.87	664
Clay	44.89%	378	52.14%	439
Clinton	41.14%	908	57.54%	1,270
Coles	39.96%	1,714	58.92%	2,527
Cook	53.66%	633,300	45.49%	536,805
Crawford	49.96%	609	47.99%	585
Cumberland	39.57%	364	56.30%	518
Dekalb	33.10%	4,146	66.50%	8,330
De Witt	45.32%	561	53.31%	660
Douglas	42.27%	484	56.16%	643
DuPage	47.32%	59,798	52.35%	66,163
Edgar	47.40%	446	49.73%	468
Edwards	48.15%	143	49.83%	148
Effingham	40.35%	868	58.02%	1,248
Fayette	47.90%	616	50.00%	643
Ford	39.08%	288	59.43%	438
Franklin	42.13%	2,179	53.79%	2,782
Fulton	45.15%	2,153	53.26%	2,540
Gallatin	40.35%	531	50.38%	663
Greene	46.90%	507	49.49%	535
Grundy	39.44%	2,053	59.67%	3,106
Hamilton	42.83%	418	49.69%	485
Hancock	56.39%	631	41.82%	468
Hardin	40.40%	162	55.36%	222
Henderson	52.07%	339	45.47%	296
Henry	50.65%	2,159	48.44%	2,065
Iroquois	37.47%	544	60.67%	881
Jackson	37.40%	2,842	62.03%	4,713
Jasper	40.54%	328	53.65%	434
Jefferson	47.15%	1,678	49.93%	1,777
Jersey	43.59%	857	54.48%	1,071
Jo Daviess	51.44%	1,320	47.78%	1,226
Johnson	45.13%	361	52.50%	420
Kane	43.41%	23,505	56.21%	30,234
Kankakee	45.67%	4,902	53.67%	5,761
Kendall	41.54%	5,611	58.04%	7,841
Knox	47.27%	2,957	51.50%	3,222
Lake	52.68%	50,271	46.97%	44,823
LaSalle	43.47%	5,279	55.55%	6,746
Lawrence	46.85%	417	48.43%	431
Lee	39.46%	1,295	59.75%	1,961
Livingston	43.47%	832	55.07%	1,054
Logan	42.79%	739	56.40%	974
McDonough	41.43%	1,054	57.82%	1,471
McHenry	38.82%	13,221	60.78%	20,702
McLean	37.11%	7,726	62.48%	13,008
Macon	53.86%	5,958	45.15%	4,995
Macoupin	43.10%	2,783	54.78%	3,537
Madison	44.04%	15,572	55.04%	19,463
Marion	47.65%	1,630	49.93%	1,708
Marshall	49.01%	569	50.47%	586
Mason	49.10%	680	48.88%	677
Massac	51.38%	549	46.81%	492
Menard	44.37%	398	54.74%	491
Mercer	51.27%	496	46.61%	860
Monroe	44.21%	1,438	54.66%	1,778
Montgomery	48.28%	1,250	49.32%	1,277
Morgan	41.54%	936	57.17%	1,288
Moultrie	44.27%	467	53.65%	566
Ogle	40.17%	2,642	59.20%	2,642
Peoria	52.14%	11,473	47.31%	10,409
Perry	46.82%	855	50.99%	931
Piatt	43.01%	788	55.51%	1,017
Pike	50.92%	497	46.21%	451
Pope	37.20%	109	60.07%	176
Pulaski	61.70%	385	34.78%	217
Putnam	46.71%	455	51.75%	504
Randolph	44.59%	1,314	52.77%	1,555
Richland	43.75%	448	53.81%	551
Rock Island	51.62%	10,240	47.11%	9,345
St. Clair	59.95%	24,218	39.21%	15,838
Saline	45.95%	1,054	50.48%	1,158
Sangamon	46.91%	9,295	52.57%	10,416
Schuyler	54.36%	368	43.43%	294
Scott	46.58%	150	50.00%	161
Shelby	44.09%	783	52.98%	941
Stark	47.13%	197	51.44%	215
Stephenson	49.00%	1,989	49.99%	2,029
Tazewell	44.71%	5,905	54.46%	7,192
Union	43.23%	921	54.23%	1,153
Vermilion	51.23%	3,048	47.13%	2,803
Wabash	49.72%	356	48.18%	345
Warren	49.02%	726	50.03%	741
Washington	39.67%	409	57.71%	595
Wayne	41.27%	319	54.20%	419
White	48.96%	565	46.01%	531
Whiteside	47.95%	2,900	51.41%	3,109
Will	47.06%	42,799	52.42%	47,674
Williamson	42.23%	2,985	55.30%	3,909
Winnebago	47.11%	15,097	52.37%	16,784
Woodford	43.80%	1,279	55.48%	1,620
Total	50.56%	1,039,555	48.61%	999,494

== Analysis ==
Hillary Clinton won her birth state of Illinois by a 2-point margin, by winning with African American voters (70-30), women (55-45), and older voters (63-36), especially senior citizens (70-29). This margin was narrower than might have been expected, with Bernie Sanders winning with voters under the age of 45 (70%-30%) who made up 39% of the electorate and white voters (57-42) who made up 58% of the electorate. He also won men, 53–45. According to exit polls, the Hispanic/Latino vote was split, with Sanders narrowly winning 50–49.

As became a trend in the Democratic primary race, Hillary Clinton won Democrats (57-42), but Sanders won self-identified Independents (69-30).

Clinton performed well in Chicago where the electorate is more diverse (she won 54–46) and in the Cook Suburbs (she won 53–46). Sanders performed well in the Collar Counties (he won 52–47) in the north (he won 53–46) and in the central/south part of the state which is whiter and more rural (he won 54–45).

== See also ==
- 2016 United States presidential election in Illinois
