= 2016 Florida Republican presidential primary =

- March 15, 2016

99 pledged delegates to the Republican National Convention
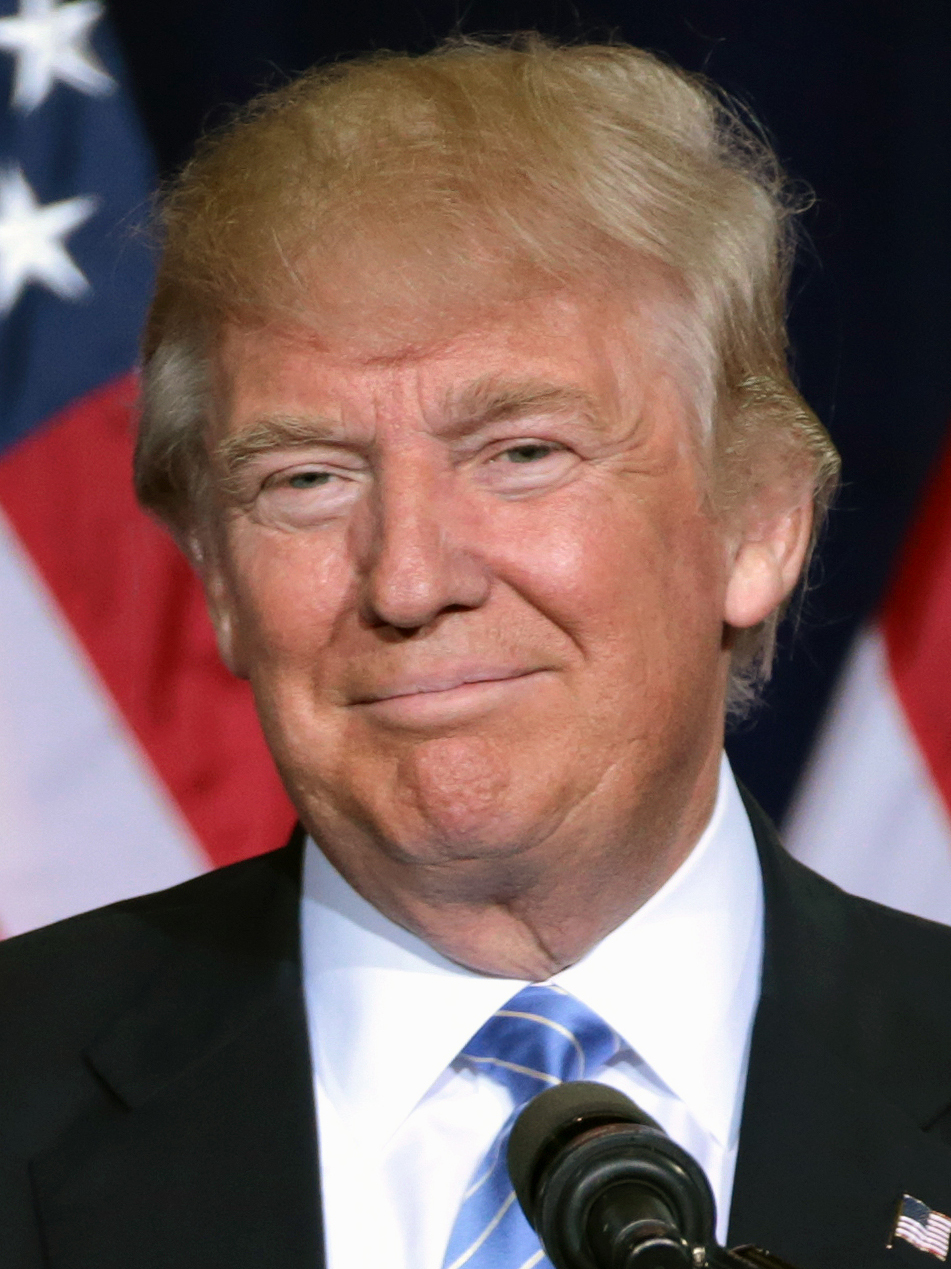

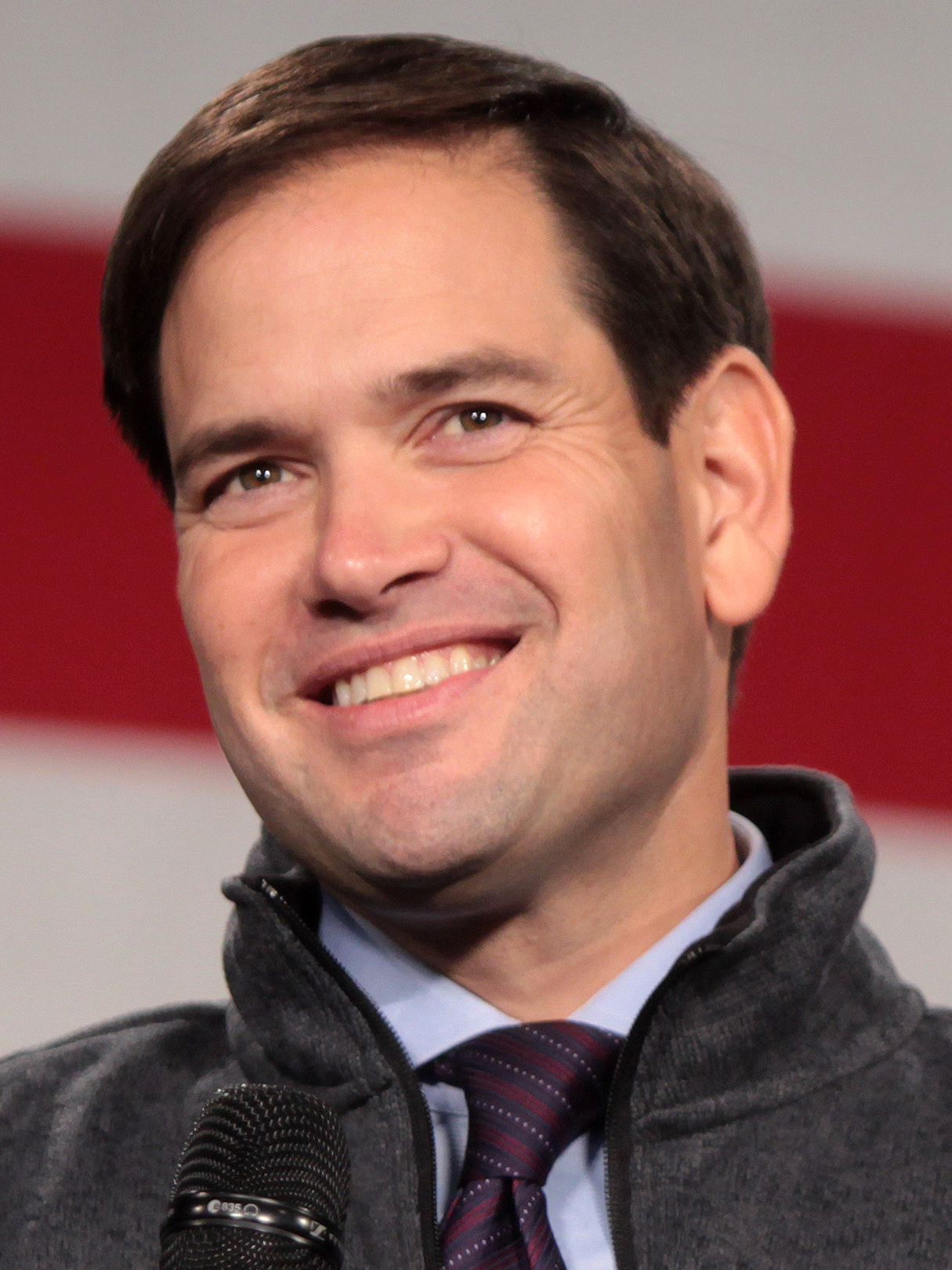

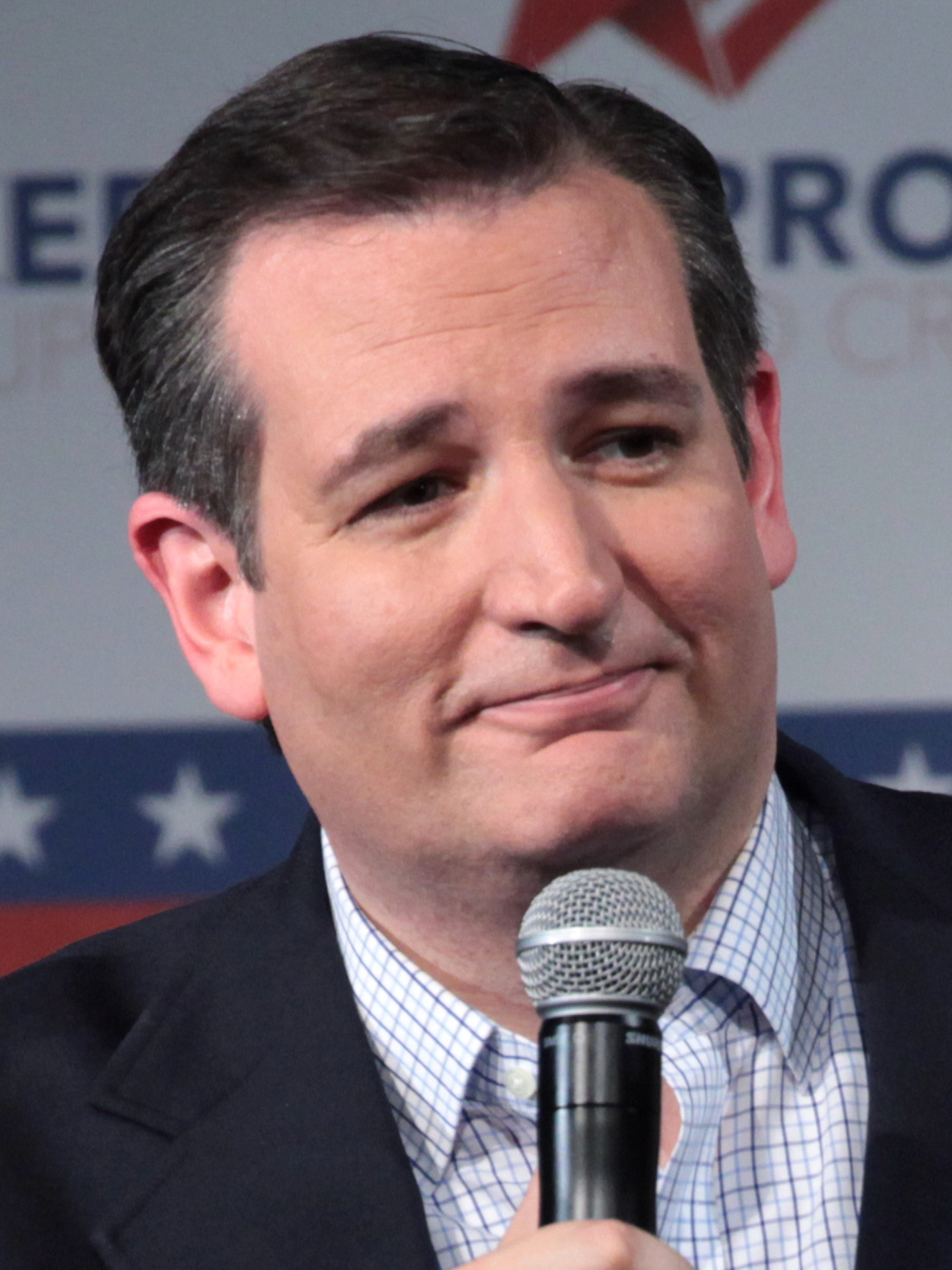

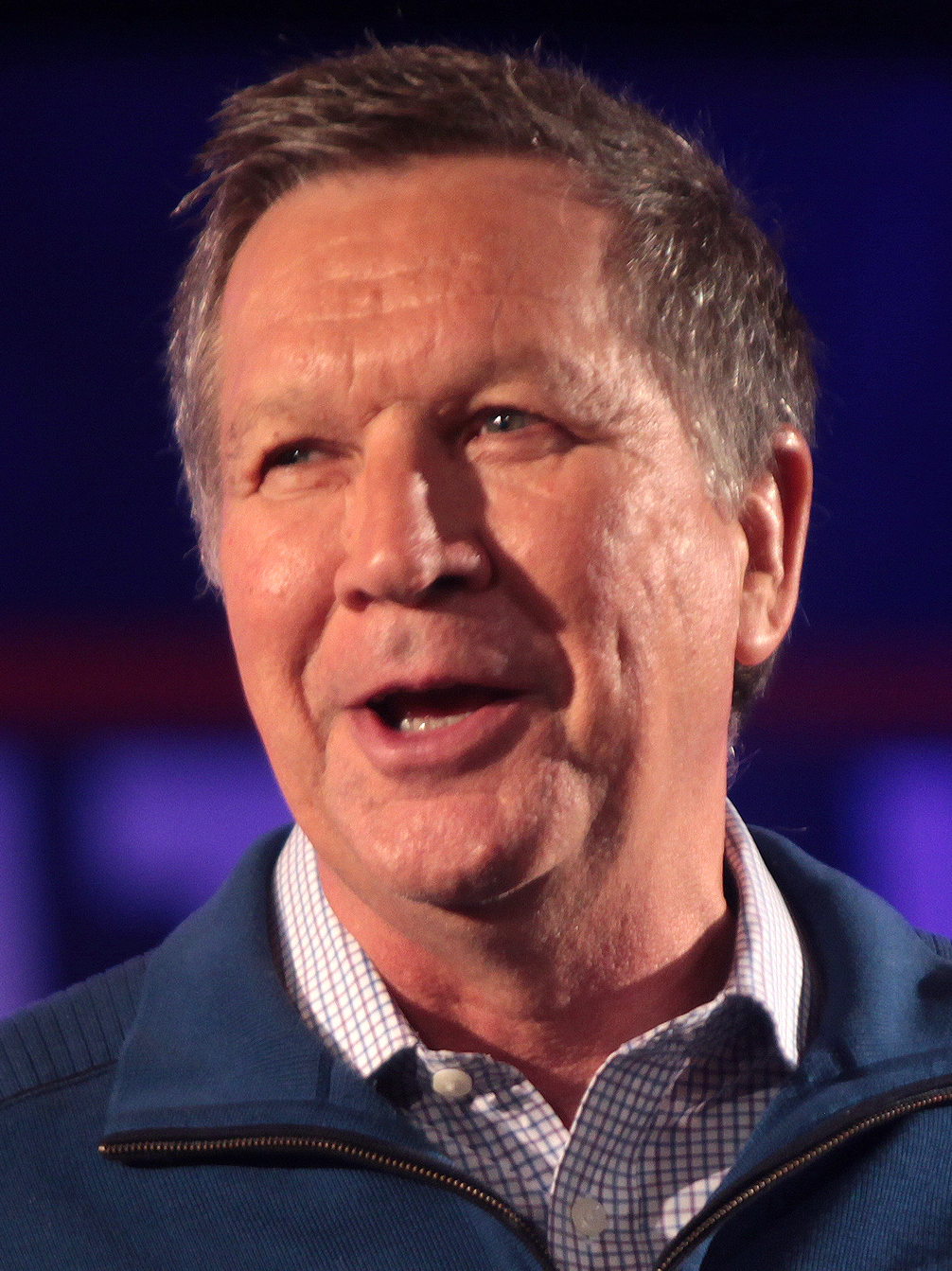
Candidate	Donald Trump	Marco Rubio
Home state	New York	Florida
Delegate count	99	0
Popular vote	1,079,870	638,661
Percentage	45.72%	27.04%
Candidate	Ted Cruz	John Kasich
Home state	Texas	Ohio
Delegate count	0	0
Popular vote	404,891	159,976
Percentage	17.14%	6.77%
- Trump: <30% 30-40% 40-50% 50-60% 60-70% Rubio: 40-50% 50-60% 60-70%

The 2016 Florida Republican presidential primary was held on March 15, 2016, with 99 delegates being allocated on a winner-take-all basis. Businessman Donald Trump scored a decisive victory in the state, defeating Senator Marco Rubio by nearly 20 points. Rubio had previously vowed to continue his campaign regardless of the results in Florida, but suspended his campaign after the state was called for Trump.

== Results ==
Florida Republican primary, March 15, 2016
Candidate	Votes	Percentage	Actual delegate count		
Candidate	Votes	Percentage	Bound	Unbound	Total
Donald Trump	1,079,870	45.72%	99	0	99
Marco Rubio	638,661	27.04%	0	0	0
Ted Cruz	404,891	17.14%	0	0	0
John Kasich	159,976	6.77%	0	0	0
Jeb Bush (withdrawn)	43,511	1.84%	0	0	0
Ben Carson (withdrawn)	21,207	0.90%	0	0	0
Rand Paul (withdrawn)	4,450	0.19%	0	0	0
Mike Huckabee (withdrawn)	2,624	0.11%	0	0	0
Chris Christie (withdrawn)	2,493	0.11%	0	0	0
Carly Fiorina (withdrawn)	1,899	0.08%	0	0	0
Rick Santorum (withdrawn)	1,211	0.05%	0	0	0
Lindsey Graham (withdrawn)	693	0.03%	0	0	0
Jim Gilmore (withdrawn)	319	0.01%	0	0	0
Unprojected delegates:			0	0	0
Total:	2,361,805	100.00%	99	0	99
Source: The Green Papers

=== Results by county ===
County	Donald Trump	Marco Rubio	Ted Cruz	John Kasich
Alachua	9,273	7,040	5,232	1,917
Baker	2,163	769	971	70
Bay	14,448	5,847	7,166	1,417
Bradford	1,802	700	964	94
Brevard	45,527	24,360	19,357	6,253
Broward	53,329	30,794	14,018	7,803
Calhoun	524	206	356	27
Charlotte	16,527	6,111	4,215	2,315
Citrus	15,245	4,991	4,865	1,706
Clay	19,380	8,475	7,835	1,643
Collier	30,108	15,607	10,569	7,071
Columbia	4,033	1,438	2,443	264
Desoto	1,449	425	452	103
Dixie	1,103	206	349	31
Duval	53,606	30,683	20,558	5,854
Escambia	20,876	12,721	11,374	3,096
Flagler	9,690	3,366	2,387	1,030
Franklin	630	249	246	73
Gadsden	995	463	742	110
Gilchrist	1,860	384	779	79
Glades	632	162	226	38
Gulf	1,039	392	519	89
Hamilton	581	126	252	29
Hardee	1,113	435	519	55
Hendry	1,290	645	552	69
Hernando	15,535	4,777	4,760	1,442
Highlands	7,496	3,153	3,062	782
Hillsborough	53,154	37,150	26,032	9,160
Holmes	1,239	454	812	64
Indian River	13,691	6,580	4,195	2,938
Jackson	2,487	6,580	1,357	145
Jefferson	676	247	537	68
Lafayette	402	126	204	13
Lake	26,424	12,199	10,625	2,918
Lee	51,754	23,969	19,186	8,628
Leon	9,115	8,843	8,672	2,773
Levy	3,751	994	1,277	256
Liberty	160	68	114	7
Madison	796	266	472	54
Manatee	26,334	13,467	9,412	4,587
Marion	31,377	11,183	9,873	3,284
Martin	16,070	6,759	3,906	3,586
Miami-Dade	40,188	111,985	16,186	5,200
Monroe	6,073	2,762	1,067	986
Nassau	9,199	3,921	3,401	1,051
Okaloosa	17,795	8,856	8,212	3,191
Okeechobee	2,204	731	574	149
Orange	41,129	31,873	19,389	7,401
Osceola	10,359	5,740	4,193	926
Palm Beach	66,313	30,999	15,384	11,996
Pasco	33,563	13,846	12,414	3,832
Pinellas	61,174	29,984	21,997	10,978
Polk	33,217	18,807	15,565	3,841
Putnam	5,123	1,554	1,672	290
Santa Rosa	16,073	7,931	7,492	1,962
Sarasota	34,620	17,886	10,108	8,107
Seminole	25,780	17,856	11,950	4,344
St. Johns	24,215	13,710	7,834	3,865
St. Lucie	18,353	6,205	3,973	2,096
Sumter	17,769	7,717	4,418	2,375
Suwannee	2,850	859	1,648	198
Taylor	1,204	358	553	61
Union	719	232	370	29
Volusia	34,204	13,503	9,933	3,972
Wakulla	1,664	586	1,317	190
Walton	6,660	2,405	2,548	883
Washington	1,738	615	1,251	112
Total	1,079,870	638,661	404,891	159,976

== Analysis ==
Donald Trump won a landslide victory in Florida by a margin of 18.7 percentage points against 3 other candidates on the ballot, and carried every county besides Miami-Dade (won by Marco Rubio). Donald Trump had several significant investments in the state through his real estate company. According to the New York Times, Mr. Trump "was able to appeal to voters with his message of economic populism and his hard line on immigration" in Florida.

According to exit polls, Trump swept all age groups, income levels, and educational attainment levels. His particular area of strength was with whites without a college degree, whom he won 54–22 over Marco Rubio. Trump also won born-again and Evangelical Christians 46–24, and white born-again Evangelical Christians 49–19. He also carried Protestants 45-24 and Catholics 50–33.

In terms of voters' primary concerns, Trump won over all groups, performing particularly well among those who worried about terrorism (he won 60–16) and those who worried most about the economy (he won 43–30). He won a particularly large victory among those whose family financial situation was "falling behind", among those who called themselves "dissatisfied" or "angry" about the federal government, and among those who said they felt betrayed by Republican politicians. He won among voters who said the U.S. support for Israel is "Not Strong Enough" 48–26. An overwhelming majority of voters said they support Trump's proposed Muslim ban.

Trump swept most regions of the state, winning in the Panhandle with 48 percent (Rubio, 25%; Cruz, 21%; Kasich, 7%), in Orlando with 49 percent (Rubio, 27%; Cruz, 17%; Kasich, 5%; Carson, 1%), in the Tampa Bay area with 46 percent (Rubio, 23%; Cruz, 18%; Kasich, 10%), and in the Gulf Coast and Mid-Florida with 48 percent (Rubio, 21%; Cruz, 18%; Kasich, 7%; Carson, 1%).

Rubio, for his part, won in Miami 42-39 as compared to Trump (Cruz, 10%; Kasich, 6%; Carson, 1%). While Trump won the state's white vote 51-22 as compared to Rubio, Rubio won Florida's Hispanic/Latino vote 52-26 as compared to Trump, which was 15% of the state's electorate. Compared to Trump, Rubio won Cubans 63–17, other Hispanics 40–38, and non-whites 45–27.

After losing his home state of Florida, Rubio withdrew from the race. As The New York Times described in its analysis of the primary results, Rubio "ran for president offering his youthful optimism and Cuban-American heritage as the embodiment of a new and more diverse generation of Republican leadership, but ultimately failed to galvanize voters in a much darker mood [...]"

Trump would later go on to win the nomination and then become the President of the United States. During his term, his official home state was also changed to Florida.
