= 2016 United States presidential election =

First election of Donald Trump

- November 8, 2016

538 members of the Electoral College 270 electoral votes needed to win
- Opinion polls
- Turnout: 60.1% (▲1.5 pp)

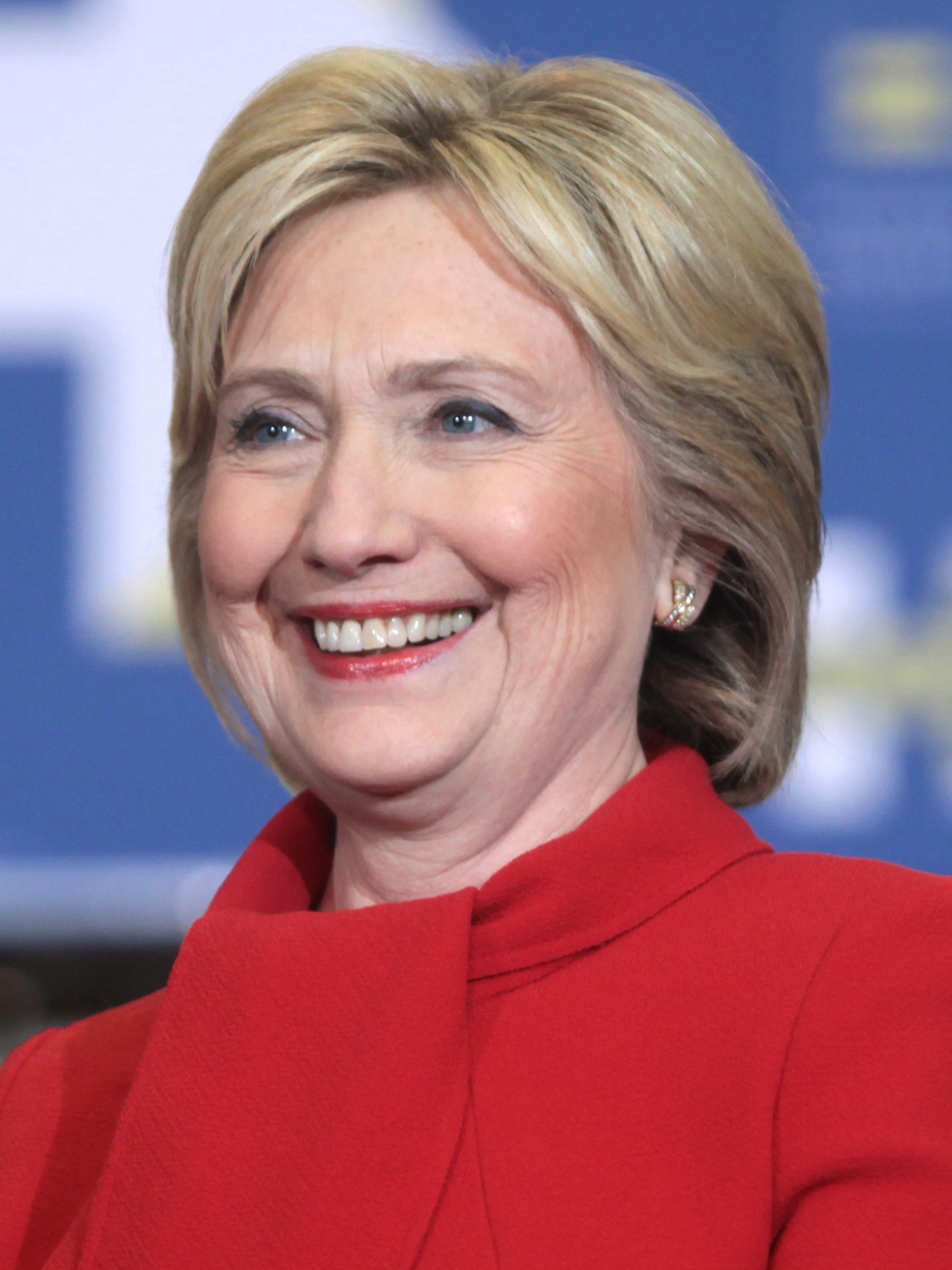
Nominee	Donald Trump	Hillary Clinton
Party	Republican	Democratic
Home state	New York	New York
Running mate	Mike Pence	Tim Kaine
Electoral vote	304 (Note: In state-by-state tallies, Trump earned 306 pledged electors, Clinton 232. They lost respectively two and five votes to faithless electors. Vice presidential candidates Pence and Kaine lost one and five votes, respectively. Three other votes by electors were invalidated and recast.)	227
States carried	30 + ME-02	20 + DC
Popular vote	62,984,828	65,853,514
Percentage	46.1%	48.2%
- Presidential election results map. Red denotes states won by Trump/Pence and blue denotes those won by Clinton/Kaine. Numbers indicate electoral votes cast by each state and the District of Columbia. On election night, Trump won 306 electors and Clinton 232. However, because of seven faithless electors (five Democratic and two Republican), Trump received 304 votes and Clinton 227.
President before election
Barack Obama
Democratic
Elected President
Donald Trump
Republican

A presidential election was held in the United States on November 8, 2016. The Republican ticket of businessman Donald Trump and Indiana governor Mike Pence defeated the Democratic ticket of former secretary of state Hillary Clinton and Virginia junior senator Tim Kaine, in what was considered one of the biggest political upsets in American history. It was the fifth and most recent presidential election in which the winning candidate lost the popular vote.

Incumbent Democratic president Barack Obama was ineligible to run for a third term due to the term limits established by the Twenty-second Amendment to the U.S. Constitution. Clinton—wife of former president Bill Clinton and as such a former first lady—secured the nomination over U.S. senator Bernie Sanders in the Democratic primary and became the first female presidential nominee of a major American political party. Initially considered a novelty candidate, Trump presented himself as a blunt-spoken political outsider and emerged as the Republican front-runner, defeating several notable opponents, including U.S. senators Ted Cruz and Marco Rubio, as well as governors John Kasich and Jeb Bush. Trump's right-wing populist and nationalist campaign promised to "Make America Great Again" and opposed political correctness and many US free trade agreements, while supporting a more hard-line approach on illegal immigration. Trump garnered extensive free media coverage due to his inflammatory comments. Clinton emphasized her extensive political experience; denounced Trump and half of his supporters as "deplorable" bigots and extremists; and advocated the expansion of Obama's policies, stressing racial equality, LGBT rights, women's rights, and inclusive capitalism.

The tone of the election campaign was widely characterized as divisive, negative, and troubling. Trump faced controversy over his views on race and immigration, incidents of violence against protesters at his rallies, and numerous sexual misconduct allegations including the Access Hollywood tape. Clinton's popularity and public image were tarnished by concerns about her ethics, trustworthiness, and a controversy and subsequent FBI investigation regarding her improper use of a private email server while serving as secretary of state, the latter of which received more media coverage than any other topic during the campaign. Clinton led in almost every nationwide and swing-state poll, with some predictive models giving her over a 90 percent chance of victory.

On election day, Trump over-performed his polls, winning several key swing states to achieve a majority in the Electoral College while losing the nationwide popular vote by 2.87 million votes. Key to Trump's pivotal upset victory were his wins in the Democratic-leaning Rust Belt states of Michigan, Pennsylvania, and Wisconsin, which he carried by fewer than 80,000 votes in the three "blue wall" states combined and gained a combined 46 electoral votes. Trump's surprise victories were perceived to have been assisted by Clinton's lack of campaigning in some swing states (especially Wisconsin), the rightward shift of the white working class, as well as the influence of Obama–Trump voters and Sanders–Trump voters. Ultimately, Trump received 304 electoral votes to Clinton's 227, as two faithless electors defected from Trump and five from Clinton. Trump was the first president with neither prior public service nor military experience.

With ballot access to the entire national electorate, Libertarian nominee Gary Johnson received nearly 4.5 million votes (3.27%), the highest nationwide vote share for a third-party candidate since Ross Perot in 1996, while Green Party nominee Jill Stein received almost 1.45 million votes (1.06%). Independent candidate Evan McMullin received 21.4% of the vote in his home state of Utah, the highest share of the vote for a non-major party candidate in any state since 1992.

On January 6, 2017, the U.S. Intelligence Community concluded that the Russian government had interfered in the election in order to "undermine public faith in the U.S. democratic process, denigrate Secretary Clinton, and harm her electability and potential presidency". A Special Counsel investigation concluded in March 2019 that Russia had interfered "in sweeping and systematic fashion" in favor of Trump's candidacy but did not establish that members of the Trump campaign colluded with the Russian government.

== Background ==
Barack Obama, the incumbent president in 2016, whose second term expired at noon on January 20, 2017

President Barack Obama, a Democrat and former U.S. senator from Illinois, was ineligible to seek reelection to a third term due to the restrictions of the American presidential term limits established by the Twenty-second Amendment.

Both the Democratic and Republican parties, as well as third parties such as the Green and Libertarian parties, held a series of presidential primary elections and caucuses that took place between February and June 2016, staggered among the 50 states, the District of Columbia, and U.S. territories. This nominating process was also an indirect election, where voters cast ballots for a slate of delegates to a political party's nominating convention, who in turn elected their party's presidential nominee. Speculation about the 2016 campaign began almost immediately following the 2012 campaign, with New York magazine declaring that the race had begun in an article published on November 8, two days after the 2012 election. On the same day, Politico released an article predicting that the 2016 general election would be between Clinton and former Florida Governor Jeb Bush, while an article in The New York Times named New Jersey Governor Chris Christie and Senator Cory Booker from New Jersey as potential candidates.

== Nominations ==
=== Republican Party ===
==== Primaries ====
With seventeen major candidates entering the race, starting with Ted Cruz on March 23, 2015, this was the largest presidential primary field for any political party in American history, before being overtaken by the 2020 Democratic presidential primaries.

Prior to the Iowa caucuses on February 1, 2016, Perry, Walker, Jindal, Graham, and Pataki withdrew due to low polling numbers. Despite leading many polls in Iowa, Trump came in second to Cruz, after which Huckabee, Paul, and Santorum withdrew due to poor performances at the ballot box. Following a sizable victory for Trump in the New Hampshire primary, Christie, Fiorina, and Gilmore abandoned the race. Bush followed suit after scoring fourth place to Trump, Rubio, and Cruz in South Carolina. On March 1, the first of four "Super Tuesday" primaries, Rubio won his first contest in Minnesota, Cruz won Alaska, Oklahoma, and his home state of Texas, and Trump won the other seven states that voted. Failing to gain traction, Carson suspended his campaign a few days later. On March 15, the second "Super Tuesday", Kasich won his only contest in his home state of Ohio, and Trump won five primaries including Florida. Rubio suspended his campaign after losing his home state.

Between March 16 and May 3, only three candidates remained in the race: Trump, Cruz, and Kasich. Cruz won the most delegates in four Western contests and in Wisconsin, keeping a credible path to denying Trump the nomination on the first ballot with 1,237 delegates. Trump then augmented his lead by scoring landslide victories in his home state of New York and five Northeastern states in April, followed by a decisive victory in Indiana on May 3, securing all 57 of the state's delegates. Without any further chances of forcing a contested convention, both Cruz and Kasich suspended their campaigns. Trump remained the only active candidate and was declared the presumptive Republican nominee by Republican National Committee chairman Reince Priebus on the evening of May 3.

A 2018 study found that media coverage of Trump led to increased public support for him during the primaries. The study showed that Trump received nearly $2 billion in free media, more than double any other candidate. Political scientist John M. Sides argued that Trump's polling surge was "almost certainly" due to frequent media coverage of his campaign. Sides concluded "Trump is surging in the polls because the news media has consistently focused on him since he announced his candidacy on June 16". Prior to clinching the Republican nomination, Trump received little support from establishment Republicans.

==== Nominees ====
Republican Party (United States) 2016 Republican Party ticket
Donald Trump	Mike Pence
for President	for Vice President
Chairman of The Trump Organization (1971–2017)	50th governor of Indiana (2013–2017)
Campaign

==== Candidates ====
Major candidates were determined by the various media based on common consensus. The following were invited to sanctioned televised debates based on their poll ratings.

Trump received 14,010,177 total votes in the primary. Trump, Cruz, Rubio and Kasich each won at least one primary, with Trump receiving the highest number of votes and Ted Cruz receiving the second highest.

Candidates in this section are sorted by popular vote from the primaries
Ted Cruz	John Kasich	Marco Rubio	Ben Carson	Jeb Bush	Rand Paul	Chris Christie	Mike Huckabee
U.S. senator from Texas (2013–present)	69th governor of Ohio (2011–2019)	U.S. senator from Florida (2011–2025)	Dir. of Pediatric Neurosurgery, Johns Hopkins Hospital (1984–2013)	43rd governor of Florida (1999–2007)	U.S. senator from Kentucky (2011–present)	55th governor of New Jersey (2010–2018)	44th governor of Arkansas (1996–2007)
Campaign	Campaign	Campaign	Campaign	Campaign	Campaign	Campaign	Campaign
W: May 3; 7,811,110 votes	W: May 4; 4,287,479 votes	W: Mar 15; 3,514,124 votes	W: Mar 4; 857,009 votes	W: Feb 20; 286,634 votes	W: Feb 3; 66,781 votes	W: Feb 10; 57,634 votes	W: Feb 1; 51,436 votes
Carly Fiorina	Jim Gilmore	Rick Santorum	Lindsey Graham	George Pataki	Bobby Jindal	Scott Walker	Rick Perry
CEO of Hewlett-Packard (1999–2005)	68th governor of Virginia (1998–2002)	U.S. senator from Pennsylvania (1995–2007)	U.S. senator from South Carolina (2003–2026)	53rd governor of New York (1995–2006)	55th governor of Louisiana (2008–2016)	45th governor of Wisconsin (2011–2019)	47th governor of Texas (2000–2015)
Campaign	Campaign	Campaign	Campaign	Campaign	Campaign	Campaign	Campaign
W: Feb 10; 40,577 votes	W: Feb 12; 18,364 votes	W: Feb 3; 16,622 votes	W: December 21, 2015; 5,666 votes	W: December 29, 2015; 2,036 votes	W: November 17, 2015; 222 votes	W: September 21, 2015; 1 write-in vote in New Hampshire	W: September 11, 2015; 1 write-in vote in New Hampshire

==== Vice presidential selection ====
Trump turned his attention towards selecting a running mate after he became the presumptive nominee on May 4. In mid-June, Eli Stokols and Burgess Everett of Politico reported that the Trump campaign was considering New Jersey Governor Chris Christie, former Speaker of the House Newt Gingrich from Georgia, Senator Jeff Sessions of Alabama, and Oklahoma Governor Mary Fallin. A June 30 report from The Washington Post also included Senators Bob Corker from Tennessee, Richard Burr from North Carolina, Tom Cotton from Arkansas, Joni Ernst from Iowa, and Indiana governor Mike Pence as individuals still being considered for the ticket. Trump also said he was considering two military generals for the position, including retired Lieutenant General Michael Flynn.

On July 12, it was reported that Trump had narrowed his list of possible running mates down to three: Christie, Gingrich, and Pence. Two days later, several major media outlets reported that Trump had selected Pence as his running mate. Trump confirmed these reports in a Twitter message on July 15, and formally made the announcement the following day in New York. On July 19, the second night of the 2016 Republican National Convention, Pence won the Republican vice presidential nomination by acclamation.

=== Democratic Party ===
==== Primaries ====
Former secretary of state Hillary Clinton, who also served in the U.S. Senate and was the first lady of the United States, became the first Democrat in the field to formally launch a major candidacy for the presidency with an announcement on April 12, 2015, via a video message. While nationwide opinion polls in 2015 indicated that Clinton was the front-runner for the 2016 Democratic presidential nomination, she faced strong challenges from independent Senator Bernie Sanders of Vermont, who became the second major candidate when he formally announced on April 30, that he was running for the Democratic nomination. September 2015 polling numbers indicated a narrowing gap between Clinton and Sanders. On May 30, former governor of Maryland Martin O'Malley was the third major candidate to enter the Democratic primary race, followed by former independent governor and Republican senator of Rhode Island Lincoln Chafee on June 3, former Virginia senator Jim Webb on July 2, and former Harvard law professor Lawrence Lessig on September 6.

On October 20, Webb announced his withdrawal from the primaries, and explored a potential independent run. The next day, Vice President Joe Biden decided not to run, ending months of speculation, stating, "While I will not be a candidate, I will not be silent". On October 23, Chafee withdrew, stating that he hoped for "an end to the endless wars and the beginning of a new era for the United States and humanity". On November 2, after failing to qualify for the second DNC-sanctioned debate after adoption of a rule change negated polls which before might have necessitated his inclusion in the debate, Lessig withdrew as well, narrowing the field to Clinton, O'Malley, and Sanders.

On February 1, 2016, Clinton won the Iowa caucuses by a margin of 0.2 points over Sanders. After winning no delegates in Iowa, O'Malley withdrew from the presidential race that day. On February 9, Sanders bounced back to win the New Hampshire primary with 60% of the vote. In the remaining two February contests, Clinton won the Nevada caucuses with 53% of the vote and scored a decisive victory in the South Carolina primary with 73% of the vote. On March 1, eleven states participated in the first of four "Super Tuesday" primaries. Clinton won Alabama, Arkansas, Georgia, Massachusetts, Tennessee, Texas, and Virginia and 504 pledged delegates, while Sanders won Colorado, Minnesota, Oklahoma, and his home state of Vermont and 340 delegates. The following weekend, Sanders won victories in Kansas, Nebraska, and Maine with 15- to 30-point margins, while Clinton won the Louisiana primary with 71% of the vote. On March 8, despite never having a lead in the Michigan primary, Sanders won by a small margin of 1.5 points and outperforming polls by over 19 points, while Clinton won 83% of the vote in Mississippi. On March 15, the second "Super Tuesday", Clinton won in Florida, Illinois, Missouri, North Carolina, and Ohio. Between March 22 and April 9, Sanders won six caucuses in Idaho, Utah, Alaska, Hawaii, Washington, and Wyoming, as well as the Wisconsin primary, while Clinton won the Arizona primary. On April 19, Clinton won the New York primary with 58% of the vote. On April 26, in the third "Super Tuesday" dubbed the "Acela primary", she won contests in Connecticut, Delaware, Maryland, and Pennsylvania, while Sanders won in Rhode Island. Over the course of May, Sanders accomplished another surprise win in the Indiana primary and also won in West Virginia and Oregon, while Clinton won the Guam caucus and Kentucky primary (and also non-binding primaries in Nebraska and Washington).

On June 4–5, Clinton won two victories in the Virgin Islands caucus and Puerto Rico primary. Two days later, the Associated Press and NBC News reported that Clinton had become the presumptive nominee after reaching the required number of delegates, including pledged delegates and superdelegates, to secure the nomination, becoming the first woman to ever clinch the presidential nomination of a major U.S. political party. On June 7, Clinton secured a majority of pledged delegates after winning primaries in California, New Jersey, New Mexico, and South Dakota, while Sanders won only Montana and North Dakota. Clinton also won the final primary in the District of Columbia on June 14. At the conclusion of the primary process, Clinton had won 2,204 pledged delegates (54% of the total) awarded by the primary elections and caucuses, while Sanders had won 1,847 (46%). Out of the 714 unpledged delegates or "superdelegates" who were set to vote in the convention in July, Clinton received endorsements from 560 (78%), while Sanders received 47 (7%).

Although Sanders had not formally dropped out of the race, he announced on June 16, that his main goal in the coming months would be to work with Clinton to defeat Trump in the general election. On July 8, appointees from the Clinton campaign, the Sanders campaign, and the Democratic National Committee negotiated a draft of the party's platform. On July 12, Sanders formally endorsed Clinton at a rally in New Hampshire in which he appeared with her. Sanders then went on to headline 39 campaign rallies on behalf of Clinton in 13 key states.

==== Nominees ====
Democratic Party (United States) 2016 Democratic Party ticket
Hillary Clinton	Tim Kaine
for President	for Vice President
67th U.S. secretary of state (2009–2013)	U.S. senator from Virginia (2013–present)
Campaign

==== Candidates ====
The following candidates were frequently interviewed by major broadcast networks and cable news channels or were listed in publicly published national polls. Lessig was invited to one forum, but withdrew when rules were changed which prevented him from participating in officially sanctioned debates.

Clinton received 16,849,779 votes in the primary.

Candidates in this section are sorted by popular vote from the primaries
Bernie Sanders	Martin O'Malley	Lawrence Lessig	Jim Webb	Lincoln Chafee
U.S. senator from Vermont (2007–present)	61st governor of Maryland (2007–2015)	Harvard Law professor (2009–2016)	U.S. senator from Virginia (2007–2013)	74th governor of Rhode Island (2011–2015)
Campaign	Campaign	Campaign	Campaign	Campaign
LN: July 26, 2016; 13,167,848 votes	W: February 1, 2016; 110,423 votes	W: November 2, 2015; 4 write-in votes in New Hampshire	W: October 20, 2015; 2 write-in votes in New Hampshire	W: October 23, 2015; 0 votes

==== Vice presidential selection ====
In April 2016, the Clinton campaign began to compile a list of 15 to 20 individuals to vet for the position of running mate, even though Sanders continued to challenge Clinton in the Democratic primaries. In mid-June, The Wall Street Journal reported that Clinton's shortlist included Representative Xavier Becerra from California, Senator Cory Booker from New Jersey, Senator Sherrod Brown from Ohio, Housing and Urban Development Secretary Julián Castro from Texas, Mayor of Los Angeles Eric Garcetti from California, Senator Tim Kaine from Virginia, Labor Secretary Tom Perez from Maryland, Representative Tim Ryan from Ohio, and Senator Elizabeth Warren from Massachusetts. Subsequent reports stated that Clinton was also considering Secretary of Agriculture Tom Vilsack, retired Admiral James Stavridis, and Governor John Hickenlooper of Colorado. In discussing her potential vice presidential choice, Clinton said the most important attribute she looked for was the ability and experience to immediately step into the role of president.

On July 22, Clinton announced that she had chosen Senator Tim Kaine from Virginia as her running mate. The delegates at the 2016 Democratic National Convention, which took place July 25–28, formally nominated the Democratic ticket.

=== Minor parties and independents ===
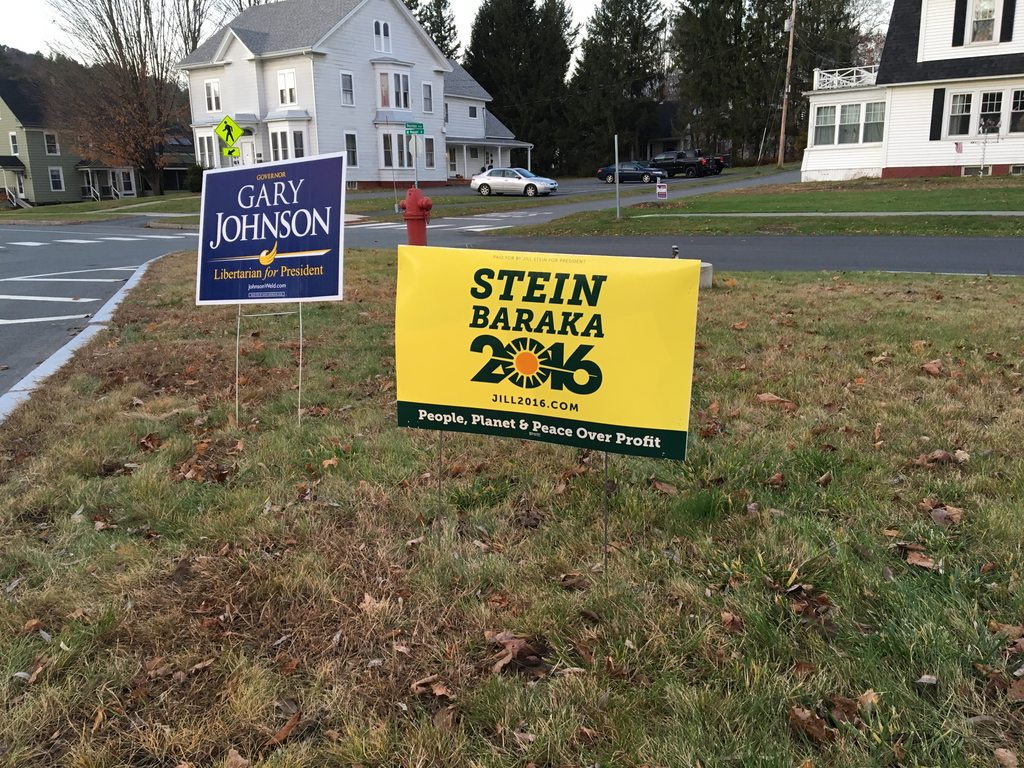
Campaign signs of third-party candidates Jill Stein and Gary Johnson, October 2016 in St. Johnsbury, Vermont

Third party and independent candidates who obtained more than 100,000 votes nationally or on ballot in at least 15 states are listed separately.

==== Libertarian Party ====
Nominees

2016 Libertarian Party ticket
Gary Johnson	Bill Weld
for President	for Vice President
29th governor of New Mexico (1995–2003)	68th governor of Massachusetts (1991–1997)

===== Withdrawn candidates =====
Candidates in this section are sorted by popular vote from the primaries
John McAfee	Austin Petersen
Founder and CEO of McAfee, Inc.	Owner and founder of The Libertarian Republic
Campaign	Campaign
3,391 votes	3,066 votes

- Gary Johnson, 29th governor of New Mexico. Vice-presidential nominee: Bill Weld, 68th governor of Massachusetts.

Notable endorsements: Scott Rigell, Tom Campbell, James L. Buckley, Jesse Ventura, John Stossel

Additional party endorsements: Independence Party of New York

- John McAfee, founder and CEO of McAfee, Inc.

Notable endorsements: Adam Kokesh, John Moore, L. Neil Smith

- Austin Petersen, owner and founder of The Libertarian Republic

Ballot access to all 538 electoral votes

==== Green Party ====
Nominees

2016 Green Party ticket
Jill Stein	Ajamu Baraka
for President	for Vice President
Physician from Lexington, Massachusetts	Activist from Washington, D.C.

- Jill Stein, physician from Lexington, Massachusetts. Vice-presidential nominee: Ajamu Baraka, activist from Washington, D.C.

Ballot access to 480 electoral votes (522 with write-in): map

- As write-in: Georgia, Indiana, North Carolina
- No ballot access: Nevada, South Dakota, Oklahoma

==== Constitution Party ====
Nominees

2016 Constitution Party ticket
Darrell Castle	Scott Bradley
for President	for Vice President
Attorney from Memphis, Tennessee	Businessman from Utah
Campaign

- Darrell Castle, attorney from Memphis, Tennessee. Vice-presidential nominee: Scott Bradley, businessman from Utah.

Ballot access to 207 electoral votes (451 with write-in): map

- As write-in: Alabama, Arizona, Connecticut, Delaware, Georgia, Illinois, Indiana, Kansas, Kentucky, Maine, Maryland, Montana, Nebraska, New Hampshire, New York, Ohio, Oregon, Rhode Island, Tennessee, Texas, Vermont, Virginia
- No ballot access: California, District of Columbia, Massachusetts, North Carolina, Oklahoma

==== Independent ====
2016 Independent ticket
Evan McMullin	Mindy Finn
for President	for Vice President
Chief policy director for the House Republican Conference (2015–2016)	President of Empowered Women (2015–present)
Campaign

- Evan McMullin, chief policy director for the House Republican Conference. Vice-presidential nominee: Mindy Finn, president of Empowered Women.

Additional party endorsement: Independence Party of Minnesota, South Carolina Independence Party

Ballot access to 84 electoral votes (451 with write-in): map

- As write-in: Alabama, Alaska, Arizona, California, Connecticut, Delaware, Georgia, Illinois, Kansas, Maine, Maryland, Massachusetts, Michigan, Missouri, Montana, Nebraska, New Hampshire, New Jersey, New York, North Dakota, Ohio, Oregon, Pennsylvania, Rhode Island, Tennessee, Texas, Vermont, Washington, West Virginia, Wisconsin
- No ballot access: District of Columbia, Florida, Hawaii, Indiana, Mississippi, Nevada, North Carolina, Oklahoma, South Dakota, Wyoming

In some states, Evan McMullin's running mate was listed as Nathan Johnson on the ballot rather than Mindy Finn, although Nathan Johnson was intended to only be a placeholder until an actual running mate was chosen.

Party for Socialism and Liberation

2016 Socialism and Liberation ticket
Gloria La Riva	Eugene Puryear
for President	for Vice President
Newspaper printer and activist from California	Activist from Washington, D.C.

==== Other nominations ====
Party	Presidential nominee	Vice presidential nominee	Attainable electors (write-in)	Popular vote	States with ballot access (write-in)
Party for Socialism and Liberation Peace and Freedom; Liberty Union Party	Gloria La Riva; Newspaper printer and activist from California	Eugene Puryear; Activist from Washington, D.C.	112 (226) map	74,402 (0.05%)	California, Colorado, Iowa, Louisiana, New Jersey, New Mexico, Vermont, Washington (Alabama, Connecticut, Delaware, Kansas, Maryland, Minnesota, New Hampshire, New York, Oregon, Pennsylvania, Rhode Island, West Virginia)
Independent	Richard Duncan; Real estate agent from Ohio	Ricky Johnson; Preacher from Pennsylvania	18 (173)	24,307 (0.02%)	Ohio (Alabama, Alaska, Delaware, Florida, Idaho, Indiana, Iowa, Kentucky, Maryland, Minnesota, Montana, Nebraska, New Hampshire, New Jersey, Oregon, Pennsylvania, Rhode Island, Vermont, West Virginia)

== General election campaign ==
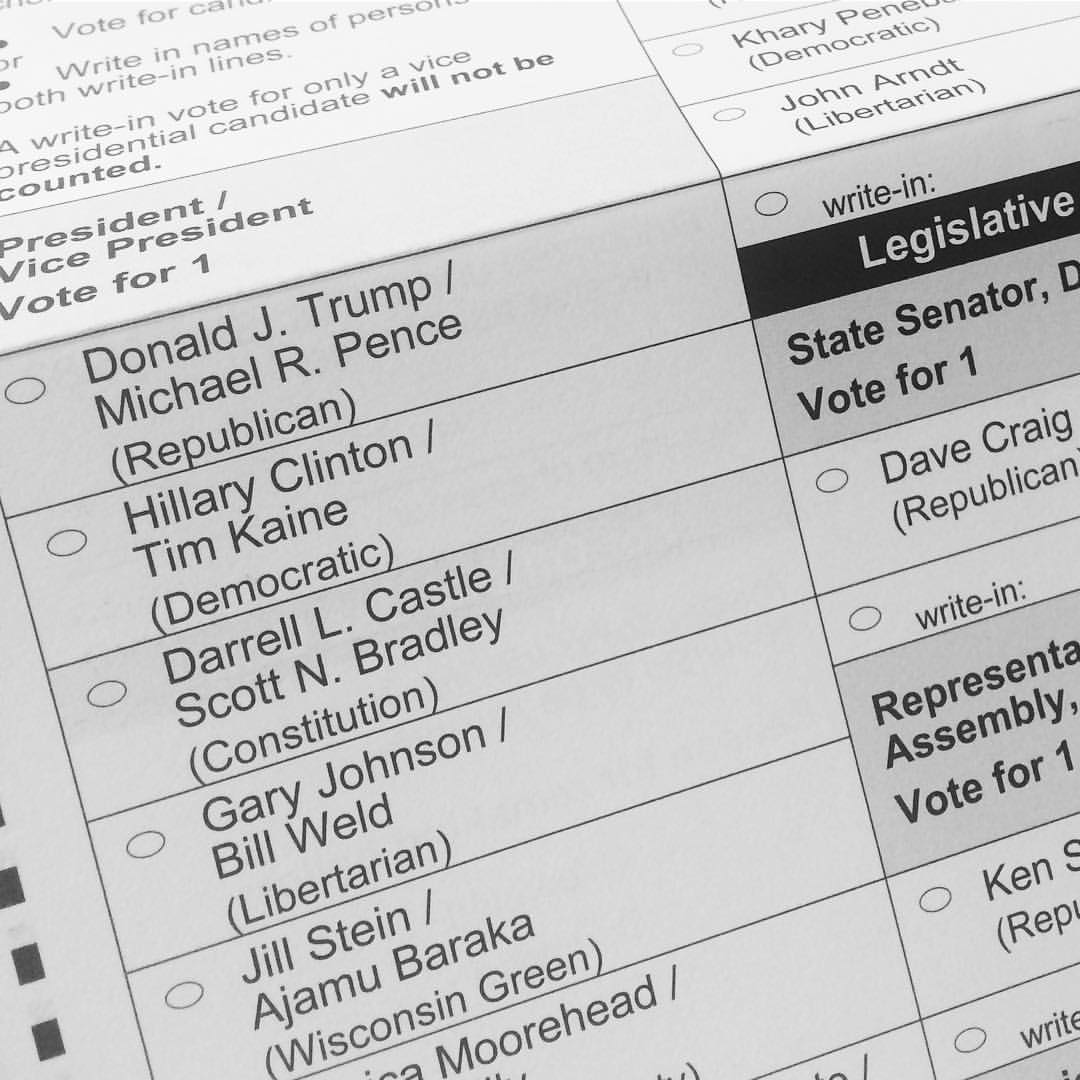
A general election ballot, listing the presidential and vice presidential candidates

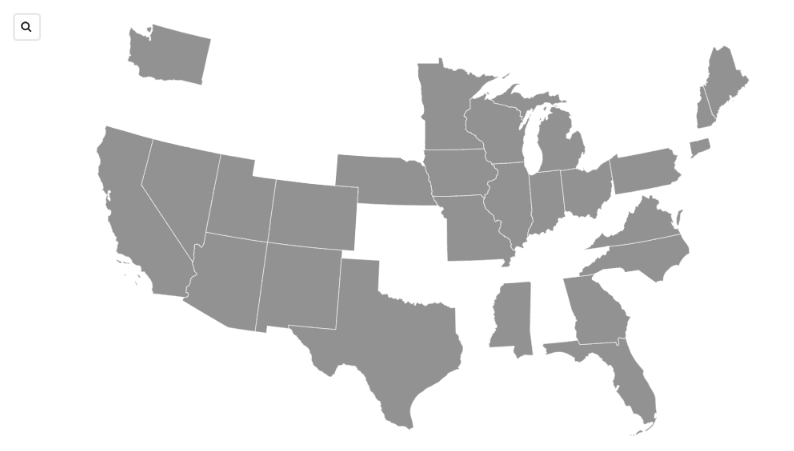
Presidential candidates Trump and Clinton campaigned in 26 states, excluding their home state, during the 2016 United States presidential election.

=== Beliefs and policies of candidates ===
Hillary Clinton focused her candidacy on several themes, including raising middle class incomes, expanding women's rights, instituting campaign finance reform, and improving the Affordable Care Act. In March 2016, she laid out a detailed economic plan basing her economic philosophy on inclusive capitalism, which proposed a "clawback" that rescinds tax cuts and other benefits for companies that move jobs overseas; with provision of incentives for companies that share profits with employees, communities and the environment, rather than focusing on short-term profits to increase stock value and rewarding shareholders; as well as increasing collective bargaining rights; and placing an "exit tax" on companies that move their headquarters out of the U.S. in order to pay a lower tax rate overseas. Clinton promoted equal pay for equal work to address current alleged shortfalls in how much women are paid to do the same jobs men do, promoted explicitly focus on family issues and support of universal preschool, expressed support for the right to same-sex marriage, and proposed allowing undocumented immigrants to have a path to citizenship stating that it "[i]s at its heart a family issue".

Donald Trump's campaign drew heavily on his personal image, enhanced by his previous media exposure. The primary slogan of the Trump campaign, extensively used on campaign merchandise, was Make America Great Again. The red baseball cap with the slogan emblazoned on the front became a symbol of the campaign and has been frequently donned by Trump and his supporters. Trump's right-wing populist positions—reported by The New Yorker to be nativist, protectionist, and semi-isolationist—differ in many ways from traditional U.S. conservatism. He opposed many free trade deals and military interventionist policies that conservatives generally support, and opposed cuts in Medicare and Social Security benefits. Moreover, he has insisted that Washington is "broken" and can be fixed only by an outsider. Support for Trump was high among working and middle-class white male voters with annual incomes of less than $50,000 and no college degree. This group, particularly those without a high-school diploma, suffered a decline in their income in recent years. According to The Washington Post, support for Trump is higher in areas with a higher mortality rate for middle-aged white people. A sample of interviews with more than 11,000 Republican-leaning respondents from August to December 2015 found that Trump at that time found his strongest support among Republicans in West Virginia, followed by New York, and then followed by six Southern states.

=== Media coverage ===
Clinton had an uneasy—and, at times, adversarial—relationship with the press throughout her life in public service. Weeks before her official entry as a presidential candidate, Clinton attended a political press corps event, pledging to start fresh on what she described as a "complicated" relationship with political reporters. Clinton was initially criticized by the press for avoiding taking their questions, after which she provided more interviews.

In contrast, Trump benefited from free media more than any other candidate. From the beginning of his campaign through February 2016, Trump received almost $2 billion in free media attention, twice the amount that Clinton received. According to data from the Tyndall Report, which tracks nightly news content, through February 2016, Trump alone accounted for more than a quarter of all 2016 election coverage on the evening newscasts of NBC, CBS and ABC, more than all the Democratic campaigns combined. Observers noted Trump's ability to garner constant mainstream media coverage "almost at will". However, Trump frequently criticized the media for writing what he alleged to be false stories about him and he has called upon his supporters to be "the silent majority". Trump also said the media "put false meaning into the words I say", and says he does not mind being criticized by the media as long as they are honest about it.

=== Controversies ===
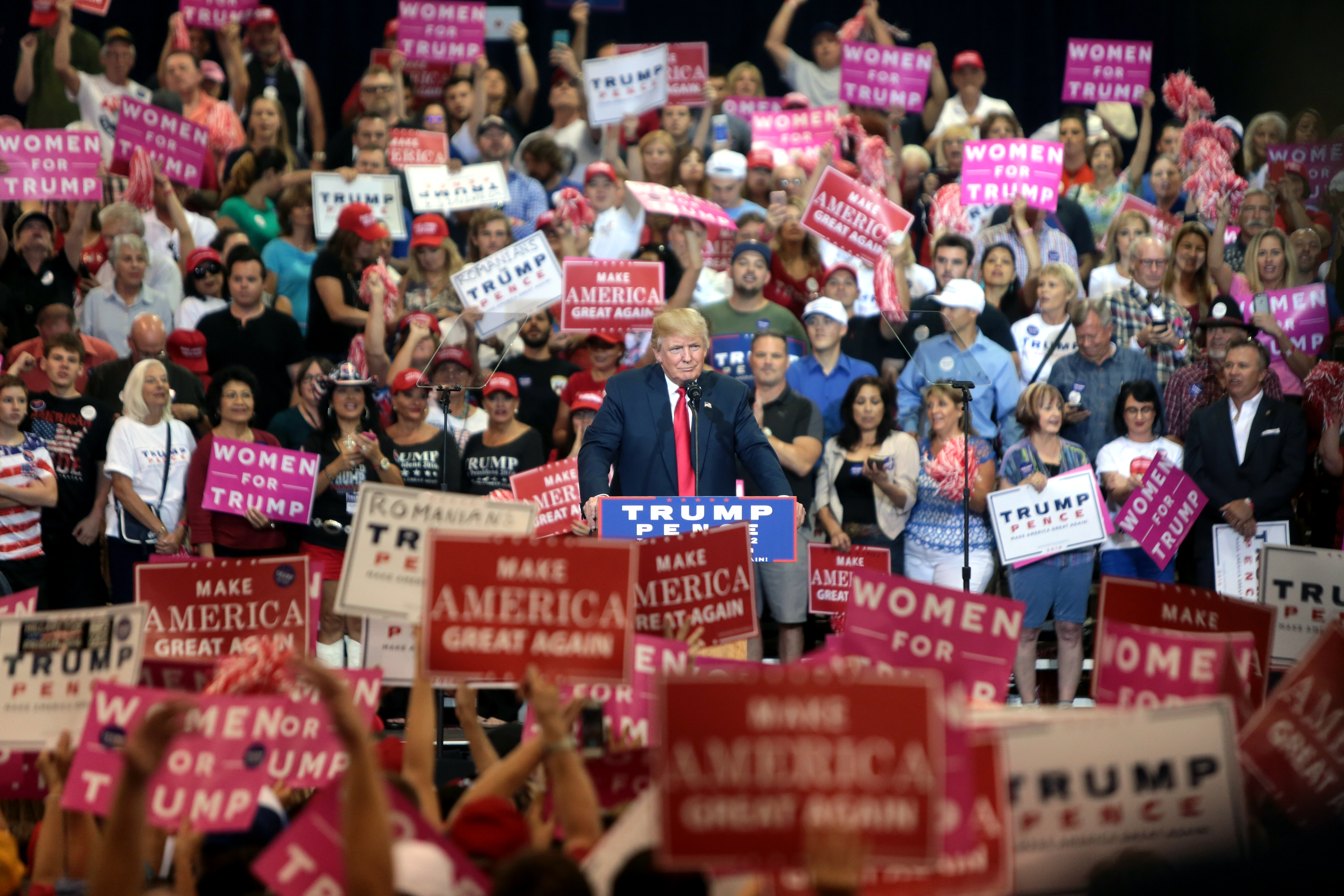
Trump at a rally in Phoenix, Arizona on October 29

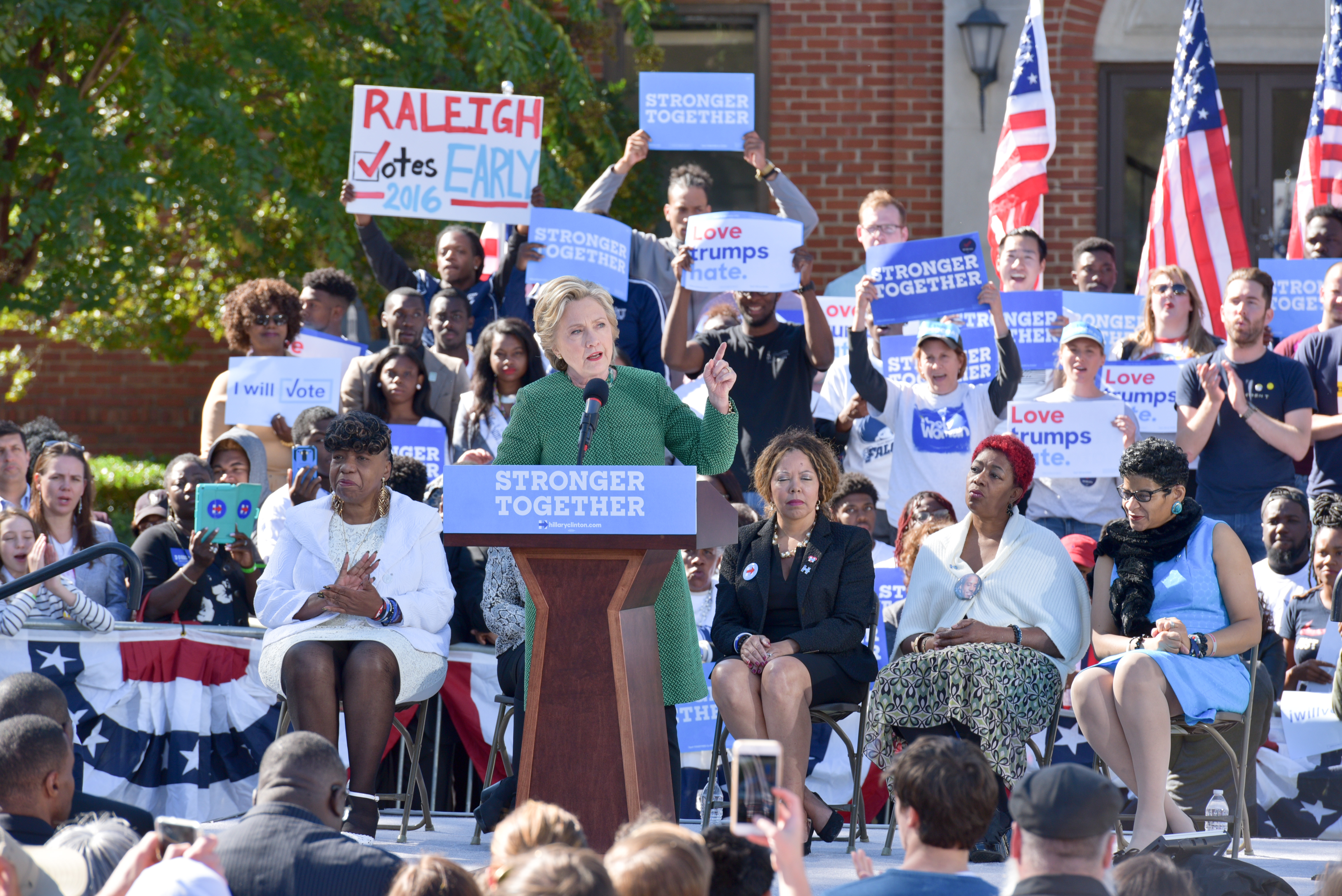
Clinton campaigning in Raleigh, North Carolina on October 22

According to a wide range of representative polls, both Clinton and Trump had significant net-unfavorability ratings, and their controversial reputations set the tone of the campaign.

Clinton's practice during her time as Secretary of State of using a private email address and server, in lieu of State Department servers, gained widespread public attention back in March 2015. Concerns were raised about security and preservation of emails, and the possibility that laws may have been violated. After allegations were raised that some of the emails in question fell into this so-called "born classified" category, an FBI probe was initiated regarding how classified information was handled on the Clinton server. The FBI probe was concluded on July 5, 2016, with a recommendation of no charges, a recommendation that was followed by the Justice Department.

Also, on September 9, Clinton said: "You know, just to be grossly generalistic, you could put half of Trump's supporters into what I call the basket of deplorables. They're racist, sexist, homophobic, xenophobic, Islamophobic—you name it", adding "But that 'other' basket of people are people who feel the government has let them down, the economy has let them down, nobody cares about them, nobody worries about what happens to their lives and their futures; and they're just desperate for change...Those are people we have to understand and empathize with as well".

Donald Trump criticized her remark as insulting his supporters. The following day Clinton expressed regret for saying "half", while insisting that Trump had deplorably amplified "hateful views and voices". Previously on August 25, Clinton gave a speech criticizing Trump's campaign for using "racist lies" and allowing the alt-right to gain prominence.

On September 11, Clinton left a 9/11 memorial event early due to illness. Video footage of Clinton's departure showed Clinton becoming unsteady on her feet and being helped into a van. Later that evening, Clinton reassured reporters that she was "feeling great". After initially stating that Clinton had become overheated at the event, her campaign later added that she had been diagnosed with pneumonia two days earlier. The media criticized the Clinton campaign for a lack of transparency regarding Clinton's illness. Clinton cancelled a planned trip to California due to her illness. The episode drew renewed public attention to questions about Clinton's health.

On the other side, on October 7, video and accompanying audio were released by The Washington Post in which Trump referred obscenely to women in a 2005 conversation with Billy Bush while they were preparing to film an episode of Access Hollywood. In the recording, Trump described his attempts to initiate a sexual relationship with a married woman and added that women would allow male celebrities to grope their genitalia (Trump used the phrase "grab 'em by the pussy"). The audio was met with a reaction of disbelief and disgust from the media. Following the revelation, Trump's campaign issued an apology, stating that the video was of a private conversation from "many years ago". The incident was condemned by numerous prominent Republicans like Reince Priebus, Mitt Romney, John Kasich, Jeb Bush and the Speaker of the House Paul Ryan. Many believed the video had doomed Trump's chances for election. By October 8, several dozen Republicans had called for Trump to withdraw from the campaign and let Pence and Condoleezza Rice head the ticket. Trump insisted he would never drop out, but apologized for his remarks.

Trump also delivered strong and controversial statements towards Muslims and Islam on the campaign trail, saying, "I think Islam hates us". He was criticized and also supported for his statement at a rally declaring, "Donald J. Trump is calling for a total and complete shutdown of Muslims entering the United States until our country's representatives can figure out what is going on". Additionally, Trump announced that he would "look into" surveilling mosques, and mentioned potentially going after the families of domestic terrorists in the wake of the San Bernardino shooting. His strong rhetoric towards Muslims resulted in leadership from both parties condemning his statements. However, many of his supporters shared their support for his proposed travel ban, despite the backlash.

Throughout the campaign, Trump indicated in interviews, speeches, and Twitter posts that he would refuse to recognize the outcome of the election if he was defeated. Trump falsely stated that the election would be rigged against him. During the final presidential debate of 2016, Trump refused to tell Fox News anchor Chris Wallace whether or not he would accept the election results. The rejection of election results by a major nominee would have been unprecedented at the time as no major presidential candidate had ever refused to accept the outcome of an election until Trump did so himself in the following 2020 presidential election.

The ongoing controversy of the election made third parties attract voters' attention. On March 3, 2016, Libertarian Gary Johnson addressed the Conservative Political Action Conference in Washington, DC, touting himself as the third-party option for anti-Trump Republicans. In early May, some commentators opined that Johnson was moderate enough to pull votes away from both Hillary Clinton and Donald Trump who were very disliked and polarizing. Johnson also began to get time on national television, being invited on ABC News, NBC News, CBS News, CNN, Fox News, MSNBC, Bloomberg, and many other networks. In September–October 2016, Johnson suffered a "string of damaging stumbles when he has fielded questions about foreign affairs". On September 8, Johnson, when he appeared on MSNBC's Morning Joe, was asked by panelist Mike Barnicle, "What would you do, if you were elected, about Aleppo?" (referring to a war-torn city in Syria). Johnson responded, "And what is Aleppo?" His response prompted widespread attention, much of it negative. Later that day, Johnson said that he had "blanked" and that he did "understand the dynamics of the Syrian conflict—I talk about them every day".

On the other hand, Green Party candidate Jill Stein said the Democratic and Republican parties are "two corporate parties" that have converged into one. Concerned by the rise of the far right internationally and the tendency towards neoliberalism within the Democratic Party, she has said, "The answer to neofascism is stopping neoliberalism. Putting another Clinton in the White House will fan the flames of this right-wing extremism".

In response to Johnson's growing poll numbers, the Clinton campaign and Democratic allies increased their criticism of Johnson in September 2016, warning that "a vote for a third party is a vote for Donald Trump" and deploying Senator Bernie Sanders (Clinton's former primary rival, who supported her in the general election) to win over voters who might be considering voting for Johnson or for Stein.

On October 28, eleven days before the election, FBI Director James Comey informed Congress that the FBI was analyzing additional Clinton emails obtained during its investigation of an unrelated case. On November 6, he notified Congress that the new emails did not change the FBI's earlier conclusion. In the week following the "Comey Letter" of October 28, Clinton's lead dropped by 3 percentage points, leading some commentators - including Clinton herself - to conclude that this letter cost her the election, though there are dissenting views.

=== Ballot access ===
Presidential ticket	Party	Ballot access			Votes	Percentage
Presidential ticket	Party	States	Electors	% of voters	Votes	Percentage
**Trump / Pence**	**Republican**	**50 + DC**	**538**	**100%**	**62,984,828**	**46.09%**
**Clinton / Kaine**	**Democratic**	**50 + DC**	**538**	**100%**	**65,853,514**	**48.18%**
**Johnson / Weld**	**Libertarian**	**50 + DC**	**538**	**100%**	**4,489,341**	**3.28%**
**Stein / Baraka**	**Green**	**44 + DC**	**480**	**89%**	**1,457,218**	**1.07%**
McMullin / Finn	Independent	11	84	15%	731,991	0.54%
Castle / Bradley	Constitution	24	207	39%	203,090	0.15%

- Candidates in **bold** were on ballots representing 270 electoral votes, without needing write-in states.
- All other candidates were on the ballots of fewer than 25 states, but had write-in access greater than 270.

=== Party conventions ===
Map of the locations of party conventions for presidential/vice-presidential candidacy nominations
Democratic Party
Republican Party
Libertarian Party
Green Party
Constitution Party

Republican Party

- July 18–21: Republican National Convention was held in Cleveland, Ohio.

Democratic Party

- July 25–28: Democratic National Convention was held in Philadelphia, Pennsylvania.

Libertarian Party

- May 26–30: Libertarian National Convention was held in Orlando, Florida.

Green Party

- August 4–7: Green National Convention was held in Houston, Texas.

Constitution Party

- April 13–16: Constitution Party National Convention was held in Salt Lake City, Utah.

=== Campaign finance ===
Wall Street spent a record $2 billion trying to influence the 2016 United States presidential election.

The following table is an overview of the money used in the campaign as it was reported to Federal Election Commission (FEC) and released in September 2016. Outside groups are independent expenditure-only committees – also called PACs and SuperPACs. The sources of the numbers are the FEC and OpenSecrets. Some spending totals are not available, due to withdrawals before the FEC deadline. As of September 2016, ten candidates with ballot access had filed financial reports with the FEC.

Candidate	Campaign committee (as of December 9)				Outside groups (as of December 9)			Total spent
Candidate	Money raised	Money spent	Cash on hand	Debt	Money raised	Money spent	Cash on hand	Total spent
Donald Trump	$350,668,435	$343,056,732	$7,611,702	$0	$100,265,563	$97,105,012	$3,160,552	$440,161,744
Hillary Clinton	$585,699,061	$585,580,576	$323,317	$182	$206,122,160	$205,144,296	$977,864	$790,724,872
Gary Johnson	$12,193,984	$12,463,110	$6,299	$0	$1,386,971	$1,314,095	$75,976	$13,777,205
Rocky De La Fuente	$8,075,959	$8,074,913	$1,046	$8,058,834	$0	$0	$0	$8,074,913
Jill Stein	$11,240,359	$11,275,899	$105,132	$87,740	$0	$0	$0	$11,275,899
Evan McMullin	$1,644,102	$1,642,165	$1,937	$644,913	$0	$0	$0	$1,642,165
Darrell Castle	$72,264	$68,063	$4,200	$4,902	$0	$0	$0	$68,063
Gloria La Riva	$31,408	$32,611	$0	$0	$0	$0	$0	$32,611
Monica Moorehead	$14,313	$15,355	-$1,043	-$5,500 (Note: Debt owed to committee)	$0	$0	$0	$15,355
Peter Skewes	$8,216	$8,216	$0	$4,000	$0	$0	$0	$8,216

=== Voting rights ===
The 2016 presidential election was the first in 50 years without all the protections of the original Voting Rights Act of 1965. Fourteen states had new voting restrictions in place, including swing states such as Virginia and Wisconsin.

=== Election administration ===
Among states that offered early in-person voting to all voters in 2016, 27 percent of all votes were cast early in person. Across states where mail voting was available to all voters, 34 percent of all votes were cast by mail. Nationwide, a total of 40 percent of votes were cast before Election Day in the 2016 general election.

=== Newspaper endorsements ===
Clinton was endorsed by The New York Times, the Los Angeles Times, the Houston Chronicle, the San Jose Mercury News, the Chicago Sun-Times and the New York Daily News editorial boards. Several papers which endorsed Clinton, such as the Houston Chronicle, The Dallas Morning News, The San Diego Union-Tribune, The Columbus Dispatch and The Arizona Republic, endorsed their first Democratic candidate for many decades. The Atlantic, which has been in circulation since 1857, gave Clinton its third-ever endorsement (after Abraham Lincoln and Lyndon Johnson).

Trump, who frequently criticized the mainstream media, was not endorsed by the vast majority of newspapers. The Las Vegas Review-Journal, The Florida Times-Union, and the tabloid National Enquirer were his highest profile supporters. USA Today, which had not endorsed any candidate since it was founded in 1982, broke tradition by giving an anti-endorsement against Trump, declaring him "unfit for the presidency".

Gary Johnson received endorsements from several major daily newspapers, including the Chicago Tribune, and the Richmond Times-Dispatch. Other traditionally Republican papers, including the New Hampshire Union Leader, which had endorsed the Republican nominee in every election for the last 100 years, and The Detroit News, which had not endorsed a non-Republican in its 143 years, endorsed Gary Johnson.

=== Notable expressions, phrases, and statements ===
By Trump and Republicans:

- "**Because you'd be in jail**": Off-the-cuff quip by Donald Trump during the second presidential debate, in rebuttal to Clinton stating it was "awfully good someone with the temperament of Donald Trump is not in charge of the law in our country".
- "**Bigly**": A word used by Donald Trump most notably during the first presidential debate, Trump claims that he said, "I'm going to cut taxes big-league, and you're going to raise taxes big-league", but that it was misheard by many as bigly.
- "**Build the wall**": A chant used at many Trump campaign rallies, and Donald Trump's corresponding promise of the Mexican Border Wall.
- "**Drain the swamp**": A phrase Donald Trump invoked late in the campaign to describe what needs to be done to fix problems in the federal government. Trump acknowledged that the phrase was suggested to him, and he was initially skeptical about using it.
- "**Grab 'em by the pussy**" and "**when you're a star, they let you do it**": A remark made by Trump during a 2005 behind-the-scenes interview with presenter Billy Bush on NBCUniversal's Access Hollywood, which was released during the campaign.
- "**I like people who weren't captured**": Donald Trump's criticism of Senator John McCain, who was held as a prisoner of war by North Vietnam during the Vietnam War.
- "**Lock her up**": A chant first used at the Republican convention to claim that Hillary Clinton was guilty of a crime. The chant was later used at many Trump campaign rallies and even against other politicians critical of Trump, such as Michigan Governor Gretchen Whitmer and (as "lock him up") against President Joe Biden. The phrase would also see use in the 2024 United States presidential election by opponents of Trump in reference to his indictments.
- "**Make America Great Again**": Donald Trump's campaign slogan.
- "**Mexico will pay for it**": Trump's false promise that if elected he will build a wall on the border between the US and Mexico, with Mexico financing the project.
- Nicknames used by Trump to deride his opponents: These include "Crooked Hillary", "Little Marco", "Low-energy Jeb", and "Lyin' Ted".
- "**Russia, if you're listening**": Used by Donald Trump to invite Russia to "find the 30,000 emails that are missing" (from Hillary Clinton) during a July 2016 news conference.
- "**Such a nasty woman**": Donald Trump's response to Hillary Clinton after her saying that her proposed rise in Social Security contributions would also include Trump's Social Security contributions, "assuming he can't figure out how to get out of it". Later reappropriated by supporters of Clinton and liberal feminists.
- "**They're not sending their best...They're bringing drugs. They're bringing crime. They're rapists. And some, I assume, are good people**": Donald Trump's controversial and false description of those crossing the Mexico–United States border during the June 2015 launch of his campaign.
- "**What the hell do you have to lose?**": Said by Donald Trump to inner-city African Americans at rallies starting on August 19, 2016.

By Clinton and Democrats:

- "**Basket of deplorables**": A controversial phrase coined by Hillary Clinton to describe half of those who support Trump.
- "**I'm with her**": Clinton's unofficial campaign slogan ("Stronger Together" was the official slogan).
- "**What, like with a cloth or something?**": Said by Hillary Clinton in response to being asked whether she "wiped" her emails during an August 2015 press conference.
- "**Why aren't I 50 points ahead?**": Rhetorical question asked by Hillary Clinton during a video address to the Laborers' International Union of North America on September 21, 2016, which was then turned into an opposition ad by the Trump campaign.
- "**When they go low, we go high**": Said by then-first lady Michelle Obama during her Democratic convention speech. This was later inverted by Eric Holder.
- "**Feel the Bern**": A phrase chanted by supporters of the Bernie Sanders campaign which was officially adopted by his campaign.
- "**Pokémon Go to the polls**": An often-ridiculed phrase coined by Hillary Clinton to encourage young people to go to the polls.

By others:

- "**What is Aleppo?**": Said by Libertarian Party nominee Gary Johnson when questioned about the Syrian Civil War. The remark was largely credited as having derailed Johnson's campaign, which was polling in the double digits at the time of the remark.

== Debates ==
=== General election ===
Sites of the 2016 general election debates

The Commission on Presidential Debates (CPD), a non-profit organization, hosted debates between qualifying presidential and vice-presidential candidates. According to the commission's website, to be eligible to opt to participate in the anticipated debates, "in addition to being Constitutionally eligible, candidates must appear on a sufficient number of state ballots to have a mathematical chance of winning a majority vote in the Electoral College, and have a level of support of at least 15 percent of the national electorate as determined by five selected national public opinion polling organizations, using the average of those organizations' most recently publicly-reported results at the time of the determination".

The three locations (Hofstra University, Washington University in St. Louis, University of Nevada, Las Vegas) chosen to host the presidential debates, and the one location (Longwood University) selected to host the vice presidential debate, were announced in September 2015. The site of the first debate was originally designated as Wright State University in Dayton, Ohio; however, due to rising costs and security concerns, the debate was moved to Hofstra University in Hempstead, New York.

On August 19, Kellyanne Conway, Trump's campaign manager confirmed that Trump would participate in a series of three debates. Trump had complained two of the scheduled debates, one on September 26 and the other October 9, would have to compete for viewers with National Football League games, referencing the similar complaints made regarding the dates with low expected ratings during the Democratic Party presidential debates.

There were also debates between independent candidates.

Debates among candidates for the 2016 U.S. presidential election
No.	Date	Time	Host	City	Moderator(s)	Participants	Viewership (millions)
P1	September 26	9:00 p.m. EDT	Hofstra University	Hempstead, New York	Lester Holt	Donald Trump; Hillary Clinton	84.0
VP	October 4	9:00 p.m. EDT	Longwood University	Farmville, Virginia	Elaine Quijano	Mike Pence; Tim Kaine	37.0
P2	October 9	8:00 p.m. CDT	Washington University in St. Louis	St. Louis, Missouri	Anderson Cooper; Martha Raddatz	Donald Trump; Hillary Clinton	66.5
P3	October 19	6:00 p.m. PDT	University of Nevada, Las Vegas	Las Vegas, Nevada	Chris Wallace	Donald Trump; Hillary Clinton	71.6

== Results ==
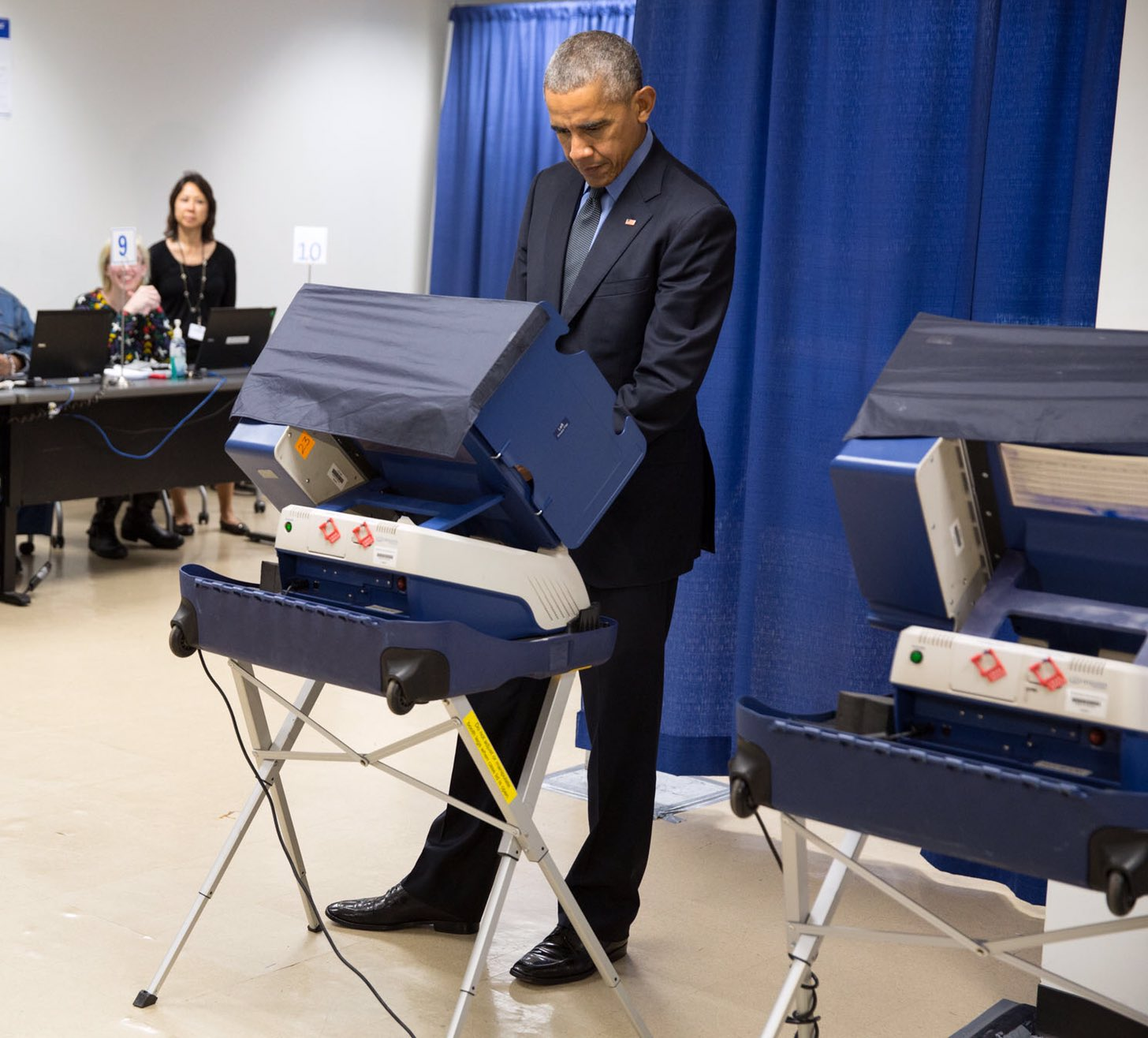
President Barack Obama voting early in Chicago on October 7

=== Election night and the next day ===
Trump declared victory over Clinton on November 9.

Clinton conceded victory to Trump on November 9.

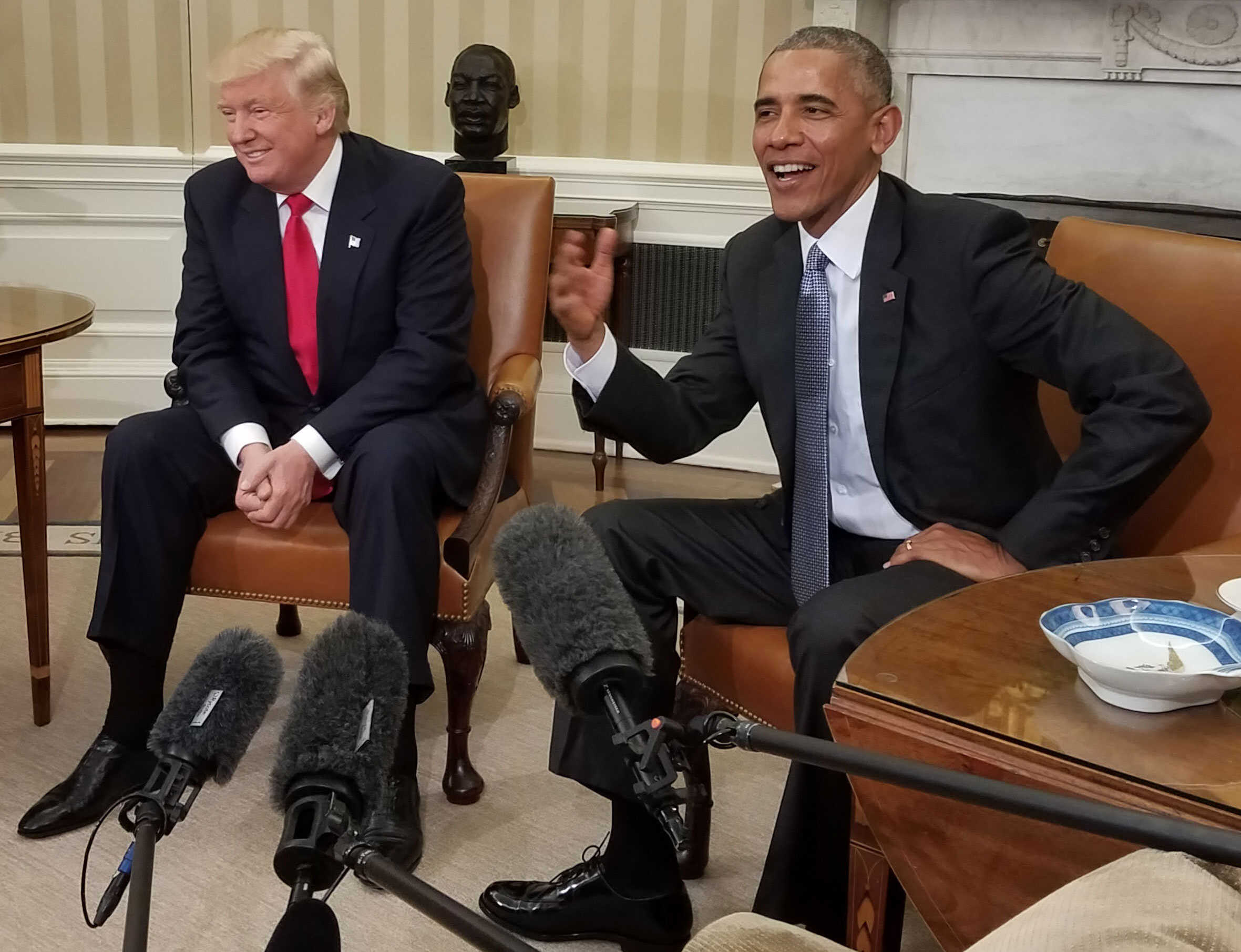
President Barack Obama (right) and President-elect Donald Trump (left) meet in the Oval Office of the White House as part of the presidential transition.

The news media and election experts were surprised at Trump's winning of the Electoral College. On the eve of the vote, spread betting firm Spreadex had Clinton at an Electoral College spread of 307–322 against Trump's 216–231. The final polls showed a lead by Clinton, and in the end she did receive more votes. Trump himself expected, based on polling, to lose the election, and rented a small hotel ballroom to make a brief concession speech, later remarking: "I said if we're going to lose I don't want a big ballroom". Trump performed surprisingly well in all battleground states, especially Florida, Iowa, Ohio, and North Carolina. Even the Democratic-leaning Rust Belt states of Michigan, Pennsylvania, and Wisconsin were narrowly won by Trump.

According to the authors of Shattered: Inside Hillary Clinton's Doomed Campaign, the White House had concluded by late Tuesday night that Trump would win the election. Obama's political director David Simas called Clinton campaign manager Robby Mook to persuade Clinton to concede the election, with no success. Obama then called Clinton directly, citing the importance of continuity of government, to ask her to publicly acknowledge that Trump had won. Believing that Clinton was still unwilling to concede, the president then called her campaign chair John Podesta, but the call to Clinton had likely already persuaded her.

The Associated Press called Pennsylvania for Trump at 1:35 AM EST, putting Trump at 267 electoral votes. By 2:01 AM EST, they had called both Maine and Nebraska's second congressional districts for Trump, putting him at 269 electoral votes, making it impossible for Clinton to reach 270. One minute after this, John Podesta told Hillary Clinton's victory party in New York that the election was too close to call. At 2:29 AM EST, the Associated Press called Wisconsin, and the election, for Trump, giving him 279 electoral votes. By 2:37 AM EST, Clinton had called Trump to concede the election.

On Wednesday morning at 2:30 AM EST, it was reported that Trump had secured Wisconsin's 10 electoral votes, giving him a majority of the 538 electors in the Electoral College, enough to make him the president-elect of the United States, and Trump gave his victory speech at 2:50 AM EST. Later that day, Clinton asked her supporters to accept the result and hoped that Trump would be "a successful president for all Americans". In his speech, Trump appealed for unity, saying "it is time for us to come together as one united people", and praised Clinton as someone who was owed "a major debt of gratitude for her service to our country".

=== Statistical analysis ===
In perspective: electoral college and popular vote

Trump won the 2016 election with 56.9% of the electoral college—placing the win in approximately the 23rd percentile of all presidential elections.

Trump's 2016 victory was among the few in which the electoral college winner received fewer popular votes than the rival (right end of chart).

The 2016 election was the fifth and most recent presidential election in which the winning candidate lost the popular vote. Six states plus a portion of Maine that Obama won in 2012 switched to Trump (Electoral College votes in parentheses): Florida (29), Pennsylvania (20), Ohio (18), Michigan (16), Wisconsin (10), Iowa (6), and Maine's second congressional district (1). Initially, Trump won exactly 100 more Electoral College votes than Mitt Romney had in 2012, with two lost to faithless electors in the final tally. Thirty-nine states swung more Republican compared to the previous presidential election, while eleven states and the District of Columbia swung more Democratic. Based on United States Census Bureau estimates of the voting age population (VAP), turnout of voters casting a vote for president was nearly 1% higher than in 2012. Examining overall turnout in the 2016 election, the University of Florida's Michael McDonald estimated that 138.8 million Americans cast a ballot. Considering a VAP of 250.6 million people and a voting-eligible population (VEP) of 230.6 million people, this is a turnout rate of 55.4% VAP and 60.2% VEP. Based on this estimate, voter turnout was up compared to 2012 (54.1% VAP) but down compared to 2008 (57.4% VAP). An FEC report of the election recorded an official total of 136.7 million votes cast for president—more than any prior election.

By losing New York, Trump became the fourth and most recent victorious candidate to lose his home state, which also occurred in 1844, 1916, and 1968. Furthermore, along with James Polk in 1844, Trump is one of two victorious presidential nominees to win without either their home state or birth state (in this case, both were New York). Data scientist Hamdan Azhar noted the paradoxes of the 2016 outcome, saying that "chief among them [was] the discrepancy between the popular vote, which Hillary Clinton won by 2.8 million votes, and the electoral college, where Trump won 304–227". He said Trump outperformed Mitt Romney's 2012 results, while Clinton only just matched Barack Obama's 2012 totals. Hamdan also said Trump was "the highest vote earner of any Republican candidate ever", exceeding George W. Bush's 62.04 million votes in 2004, though neither reached Clinton's 65.9 million, nor Obama's 69.5 million votes in 2008. He concluded, with help from The Cook Political Report, that the election hinged not on Clinton's large 2.8 million overall vote margin over Trump, but rather on about 78,000 votes from only three counties in Wisconsin, Pennsylvania, and Michigan. Clinton was the first former Secretary of State to be nominated by a major political party since James G. Blaine in 1884.

This is the first election since 1988 in which the Republican nominee won the states of Michigan and Pennsylvania, and the first since 1984 in which they won Wisconsin. It was the first time since 1988 that the Republican nominee won Maine's second congressional district and the first time since George W. Bush's victory in New Hampshire in 2000 that they won any electoral votes in the Northeast. Clinton only narrowly won New Hampshire by 0.37% (2,736 votes).

This marked the first time that Maine split its electoral votes since it began awarding them based on congressional districts in 1972, and the first time the state split its electoral vote since 1828. The 2016 election marked the eighth consecutive presidential election where the victorious major party nominee did not receive a popular vote majority by a double-digit margin over the losing major party nominee(s), with the sequence of presidential elections from 1988 through 2016 surpassing the sequence from 1876 through 1900 to become the longest sequence of such presidential elections in U.S. history. It was also the sixth presidential election in which both major party candidates were registered in the same home state; the others have been in 1860, 1904, 1920, 1940, and 1944. It was also the first election since 1928 that the Republicans won without having either Richard Nixon or one of the Bushes on the ticket.

Trump was the first president with neither prior public service nor military experience. This election was the first since 1908 where neither candidate was currently serving in public office. This was the first election since 1980 where a Republican was elected without carrying every former Confederate state in the process, as Trump lost Virginia in this election. (Note: In 1980, Democrat Jimmy Carter carried his home state of Georgia, despite losing the election.) This was also the first presidential election since 1876 in which Virginia voted Democratic while Florida voted Republican, which has occurred in every subsequent presidential election as well. Although both Virginia and Florida voted for Republican George W. Bush and Democrat Barack Obama twice, Virginia became a blue state while Florida became a red state. Florida backed Trump even when he lost the electoral vote in 2020, and Virginia backed Kamala Harris even though she lost the popular vote in 2024.

Trump became the first Republican to earn more than 300 electoral votes since the 1988 election. This was the first time since 1976 that a Republican presidential candidate lost a pledged vote via a faithless elector, and, additionally, this was the first time since 1972 that the winning presidential candidate lost an electoral vote due to faithless electors. With ballot access to the entire national electorate, Johnson received nearly 4.5 million votes (3.27%), the highest nationwide vote share for a third-party candidate since Ross Perot in 1996, while Stein received almost 1.45 million votes (1.06%), the most for a Green nominee since Ralph Nader in 2000. Johnson received the highest ever share of the vote for a Libertarian nominee, surpassing Ed Clark's 1980 result.

Independent candidate Evan McMullin, who appeared on the ballot in eleven states, received over 732,000 votes (0.53%). He won 21.4% of the vote in his home state of Utah, the highest share of the vote for a third-party candidate in any state since 1992. Despite dropping out of the election following his defeat in the Democratic primary, Senator Bernie Sanders received 5.7% of the vote in his home state of Vermont, the highest write-in draft campaign percentage for a presidential candidate in American history. Johnson and McMullin were the first third-party candidates since Nader to receive at least 5% of the vote in one or more states, with Johnson crossing the mark in nine states and McMullin crossing it in two. At age 70, Trump was the oldest non-incumbent ever to win a presidential election, surpassing Ronald Reagan's record in 1980, who was first elected at age 69. Four years later, in 2020, Biden surpassed this record at age 77, as did Trump again in 2024 at age 78. Of the 3,153 counties/districts/independent cities making returns, Trump won the most popular votes in 2,649 (84.02%) while Clinton carried 504 (15.98%).

=== Electoral results ===
Electoral results
Presidential candidate	Party	Home state	Popular vote		Electoral vote	Running mate		
Presidential candidate	Party	Home state	Count	Percentage	Electoral vote	Vice-presidential candidate	Home state	Electoral vote
Donald Trump	Republican	New York	62,984,828	46.09%	304 (306)	Mike Pence	Indiana	304 (Note: Pence received 305 electoral votes for vice president, but only 304 as part of the Trump–Pence ticket; one faithless elector from Texas voted for Ron Paul as president instead of Trump, and is recorded separately below.)
Hillary Clinton	Democratic	New York	65,853,514	48.18%	227 (232)	Tim Kaine	Virginia	227
Gary Johnson	Libertarian	New Mexico	4,489,341	3.28%	0	William Weld	Massachusetts	0
Jill Stein	Green	Massachusetts	1,457,218	1.07%	0	Ajamu Baraka	Illinois	0
Evan McMullin	Independent	Utah	731,991	0.54%	0	Mindy Finn	District of Columbia	0
Darrell Castle	Constitution	Tennessee	203,090	0.15%	0	Scott Bradley	Utah	0
Gloria La Riva	Socialism and Liberation	California	74,401	0.05%	0	Eugene Puryear	District of Columbia	0
Tickets that received electoral votes from faithless electors
Bernie Sanders (Note: Received electoral vote(s) from a faithless elector)	Independent	Vermont	111,850 (Note: Candidate received votes as a write-in. The exact numbers of write-in votes have been published for three states: California, New Hampshire, and Vermont.)	0.08%	1 (0)	Elizabeth Warren	Massachusetts	1
John Kasich (Note: Two faithless electors from Texas cast their presidential votes for Ron Paul and John Kasich, respectively. Chris Suprun said he cast his presidential vote for John Kasich and his vice presidential vote for Carly Fiorina. The other faithless elector in Texas, Bill Greene, cast his presidential vote for Ron Paul but cast his vice presidential vote for Mike Pence, as pledged. John Kasich received recorded write-in votes in Alabama, Georgia, Illinois, New Hampshire, North Carolina, Pennsylvania, and Vermont.)	Republican	Ohio	2,684	0.00%	1 (0)	Carly Fiorina	Virginia	1
Ron Paul	Libertarian	Texas	124	0.00%	1 (0)	Mike Pence	Indiana	1
Colin Luther Powell	Republican	Virginia	25	0.00%	3 (0)	Elizabeth Warren	Massachusetts	1
Colin Luther Powell	Republican	Virginia	25	0.00%	3 (0)	Maria Cantwell	Washington	1
Colin Luther Powell	Republican	Virginia	25	0.00%	3 (0)	Susan Collins	Maine	1
Faith Spotted Eagle	Democratic	South Dakota	0	0.00%	1 (0)	Winona LaDuke	Minnesota	1
Other			760,210	0.56%	—	Other		—
Total			136,669,276	100%	538			538
Needed to win					270			270

Popular vote
Clinton	48.18%
Trump	46.09%
Johnson	3.28%
Stein	1.07%
Others	1.38%

↓
232	306
Clinton	Trump

Electoral vote—pledged
Trump/Pence	56.88%
Clinton/Kaine	43.12%

Electoral vote—President
Trump	56.51%
Clinton	42.19%
Powell	0.56%
Kasich	0.19%
Paul	0.19%
Sanders	0.19%
Spotted Eagle	0.19%

Electoral vote—Vice President
Pence	56.69%
Kaine	42.19%
Warren	0.37%
Cantwell	0.19%
Collins	0.19%
Fiorina	0.19%
LaDuke	0.19%

=== Results by state ===
The table below displays the official vote tallies by each state's Electoral College voting method. The source for the results of all states is the official Federal Election Commission report. The column labeled "Margin" shows Trump's margin of victory over Clinton (the margin is negative for every state that Clinton won). A total of 29 third party and independent presidential candidates appeared on the ballot in at least one state. Former Governor of New Mexico Gary Johnson and physician Jill Stein repeated their 2012 roles as the nominees for the Libertarian Party and the Green Party, respectively.

Aside from Florida and North Carolina, the states that secured Trump's victory are situated in the Great Lakes/Rust Belt region. Wisconsin went Republican for the first time since 1984, while Pennsylvania and Michigan went Republican for the first time since 1988. Stein petitioned for a recount in Wisconsin, Michigan, and Pennsylvania. The Clinton campaign pledged to participate in the Green Party recount efforts, while Trump backers challenged them in court. Meanwhile, American Delta Party/Reform Party presidential candidate Rocky De La Fuente petitioned for and was granted a partial recount in Nevada. According to a 2021 study in Science Advances, conversion of voters who voted for Obama in 2012 to Trump in 2016 contributed to Republican flips in Ohio, Michigan, and Pennsylvania.

Legend
States/districts won by Clinton/Kaine
States/districts won by Trump/Pence
†	At-large results (for states that split electoral votes)

State or district	Clinton/Kaine Democratic			Trump/Pence Republican			Johnson/Weld Libertarian			Stein/Baraka Green			McMullin/Finn Independent			Others			Margin		Margin swing (Note: Percentage point difference in margin from the 2012 election)	Total votes		Sources
State or district	Votes	%	EV	Votes	%	EV	Votes	%	EV	Votes	%	EV	Votes	%	EV	Votes	%	EV	Votes	%	%	Total votes		Sources
Alabama	729,547	34.36%	–	1,318,255	62.08%	9	44,467	2.09%	–	9,391	0.44%	–	–	–	–	21,712	1.02%	–	588,708	27.72%	5.54%	2,123,372	AL	
Alaska	116,454	36.55%	–	163,387	51.28%	3	18,725	5.88%	–	5,735	1.80%	–	–	–	–	14,307	4.49%	–	46,933	14.73%	0.74%	318,608	AK	
Arizona	1,161,167	45.13%	–	1,252,401	48.67%	11	106,327	4.13%	–	34,345	1.33%	–	17,449	0.68%	–	1,476	0.06%	–	91,234	3.54%	−5.56%	2,573,165	AZ	
Arkansas	380,494	33.65%	–	684,872	60.57%	6	29,949	2.64%	–	9,473	0.84%	–	13,176	1.17%	–	12,712	1.12%	–	304,378	26.92%	3.23%	1,130,676	AR	
California	8,753,788	61.73%	55	4,483,810	31.62%	–	478,500	3.37%	–	278,657	1.96%	–	39,596	0.28%	–	147,244	1.04%	–	−4,269,978	−30.11%	−6.99%	14,181,595	CA	
Colorado	1,338,870	48.16%	9	1,202,484	43.25%	–	144,121	5.18%	–	38,437	1.38%	–	28,917	1.04%	–	27,418	0.99%	–	−136,386	−4.91%	0.45%	2,780,247	CO	
Connecticut	897,572	54.57%	7	673,215	40.93%	–	48,676	2.96%	–	22,841	1.39%	–	2,108	0.13%	–	508	0.03%	–	−224,357	−13.64%	3.69%	1,644,920	CT	
Delaware	235,603	53.09%	3	185,127	41.71%	–	14,757	3.32%	–	6,103	1.37%	–	706	0.16%	–	1,518	0.34%	–	−50,476	−11.38%	7.26%	443,814	DE	
District of Columbia	282,830	90.86%	3	12,723	4.09%	–	4,906	1.57%	–	4,258	1.36%	–	–	–	–	6,551	2.52%	–	−270,107	−86.77%	−3.14%	311,268	DC	
Florida	4,504,975	47.82%	–	4,617,886	49.02%	29	207,043	2.20%	–	64,399	0.68%	–	–	–	–	25,736	0.28%	–	112,911	1.20%	2.08%	9,420,039	FL	
Georgia	1,877,963	45.64%	–	2,089,104	50.77%	16	125,306	3.05%	–	7,674	0.19%	–	13,017	0.32%	–	1,668	0.04%	–	211,141	5.13%	−2.69%	4,114,732	GA	
Hawaii	266,891	62.22%	3	128,847	30.04%	–	15,954	3.72%	–	12,737	2.97%	–	–	–	–	4,508	1.05%	1	−138,044	−32.18%	10.53%	428,937	HI	
Idaho	189,765	27.49%	–	409,055	59.26%	4	28,331	4.10%	–	8,496	1.23%	–	46,476	6.73%	–	8,132	1.18%	–	219,290	31.77%	0.08%	690,255	ID	
Illinois	3,090,729	55.83%	20	2,146,015	38.76%	–	209,596	3.79%	–	76,802	1.39%	–	11,655	0.21%	–	1,627	0.03%	–	−944,714	−17.07%	−0.19%	5,536,424	IL	
Indiana	1,033,126	37.77%	–	1,557,286	56.94%	11	133,993	4.90%	–	7,841	0.29%	–	–	–	–	2,712	0.10%	–	524,160	19.17%	8.97%	2,734,958	IN	
Iowa	653,669	41.74%	–	800,983	51.15%	6	59,186	3.78%	–	11,479	0.73%	–	12,366	0.79%	–	28,348	1.81%	–	147,314	9.41%	15.22%	1,566,031	IA	
Kansas	427,005	36.05%	–	671,018	56.65%	6	55,406	4.68%	–	23,506	1.98%	–	6,520	0.55%	–	947	0.08%	–	244,013	20.60%	−1.11%	1,184,402	KS	
Kentucky	628,854	32.68%	–	1,202,971	62.52%	8	53,752	2.79%	–	13,913	0.72%	–	22,780	1.18%	–	1,879	0.10%	–	574,177	29.84%	7.15%	1,924,149	KY	
Louisiana	780,154	38.45%	–	1,178,638	58.09%	8	37,978	1.87%	–	14,031	0.69%	–	8,547	0.42%	–	9,684	0.48%	–	398,484	19.64%	2.44%	2,029,032	LA	
Maine †	357,735	47.83%	2	335,593	44.87%	–	38,105	5.09%	–	14,251	1.91%	–	1,887	0.25%	–	356	0.05%	–	−22,142	−2.96%	12.33%	747,927	ME-AL	
ME-1	212,774	53.96%	1	154,384	39.15%	–	18,592	4.71%	–	7,563	1.92%	–	807	0.20%	–	209	0.05%	–	−58,390	−14.81%	6.58%	394,329	ME1	
ME-2	144,817	40.98%	–	181,177	51.26%	1	19,510	5.52%	–	6,685	1.89%	–	1,080	0.31%	–	147	0.04%	–	36,360	10.28%	18.85%	353,416	ME2	
Maryland	1,677,928	60.33%	10	943,169	33.91%	–	79,605	2.86%	–	35,945	1.29%	–	9,630	0.35%	–	35,169	1.26%	–	−734,759	−26.42%	−0.35%	2,781,446	MD	
Massachusetts	1,995,196	60.01%	11	1,090,893	32.81%	–	138,018	4.15%	–	47,661	1.43%	–	2,719	0.08%	–	50,559	1.52%	–	−904,303	−27.20%	−4.06%	3,325,046	MA	
Michigan	2,268,839	47.27%	–	2,279,543	47.50%	16	172,136	3.59%	–	51,463	1.07%	–	8,177	0.17%	–	19,126	0.40%	–	10,704	0.23%	9.73%	4,799,284	MI	
Minnesota	1,367,716	46.44%	10	1,322,951	44.92%	–	112,972	3.84%	–	36,985	1.26%	–	53,076	1.80%	–	51,113	1.74%	–	−44,765	−1.52%	6.17%	2,944,813	MN	
Mississippi	485,131	40.11%	–	700,714	57.94%	6	14,435	1.19%	–	3,731	0.31%	–	–	–	–	5,346	0.44%	–	215,583	17.83%	6.33%	1,209,357	MS	
Missouri	1,071,068	38.14%	–	1,594,511	56.77%	10	97,359	3.47%	–	25,419	0.91%	–	7,071	0.25%	–	13,177	0.47%	–	523,443	18.63%	9.26%	2,808,605	MO	
Montana	177,709	35.75%	–	279,240	56.17%	3	28,037	5.64%	–	7,970	1.60%	–	2,297	0.46%	–	1,894	0.38%	–	101,531	20.42%	6.77%	497,147	MT	
Nebraska †	284,494	33.70%	–	495,961	58.75%	2	38,946	4.61%	–	8,775	1.04%	–	–	–	–	16,051	1.90%	–	211,467	25.05%	3.28%	844,227	NE-AL	
NE-1	100,132	35.46%	–	158,642	56.18%	1	14,033	4.97%	–	3,374	1.19%	–	–	–	–	6,181	2.19%	–	58,500	20.72%	4.12%	282,338	NE1	
NE-2	131,030	44.92%	–	137,564	47.16%	1	13,245	4.54%	–	3,347	1.15%	–	–	–	–	6,494	2.23%	–	6,534	2.24%	−4.91%	291,680	NE2	
NE-3	53,332	19.73%	–	199,755	73.92%	1	11,668	4.32%	–	2,054	0.76%	–	–	–	–	3,451	1.28%	–	146,367	54.19%	11.78%	270,109	NE3	
Nevada	539,260	47.92%	6	512,058	45.50%	–	37,384	3.29%	–	–	–	–	–	–	–	36,683	3.23%	–	−27,202	−2.42%	4.26%	1,125,385	NV	
New Hampshire	348,526	46.83%	4	345,790	46.46%	–	30,777	4.15%	–	6,496	0.88%	–	1,064	0.14%	–	11,643	1.24%	–	−2,736	−0.37%	5.21%	744,296	NH	
New Jersey	2,148,278	55.45%	14	1,601,933	41.35%	–	72,477	1.87%	–	37,772	0.98%	–	–	–	–	13,586	0.35%	–	−546,345	−14.10%	3.69%	3,874,046	NJ	
New Mexico	385,234	48.26%	5	319,667	40.04%	–	74,541	9.34%	–	9,879	1.24%	–	5,825	0.73%	–	3,173	0.40%	–	−65,567	−8.22%	1.94%	798,319	NM	
New York	4,556,124	59.01%	29	2,819,534	36.52%	–	176,598	2.29%	–	107,934	1.40%	–	10,373	0.13%	–	50,890	0.66%	–	−1,736,590	−22.49%	5.69%	7,721,453	NY	
North Carolina	2,189,316	46.17%	–	2,362,631	49.83%	15	130,126	2.74%	–	12,105	0.26%	–	–	–	–	47,386	1.00%	–	173,315	3.66%	1.62%	4,741,564	NC	
North Dakota	93,758	27.23%	–	216,794	62.96%	3	21,434	6.22%	–	3,780	1.10%	–	–	–	–	8,594	2.49%	–	123,036	35.73%	16.11%	344,360	ND	
Ohio	2,394,164	43.56%	–	2,841,005	51.69%	18	174,498	3.17%	–	46,271	0.84%	–	12,574	0.23%	–	27,975	0.51%	–	446,841	8.13%	11.11%	5,496,487	OH	
Oklahoma	420,375	28.93%	–	949,136	65.32%	7	83,481	5.75%	–	–	–	–	–	–	–	–	–	–	528,761	36.39%	2.95%	1,452,992	OK	
Oregon	1,002,106	50.07%	7	782,403	39.09%	–	94,231	4.71%	–	50,002	2.50%	–	–	–	–	72,594	3.63%	–	−219,703	−10.98%	1.11%	2,001,336	OR	
Pennsylvania	2,926,441	47.46%	–	2,970,733	48.18%	20	146,715	2.38%	–	49,941	0.81%	–	6,472	0.11%	–	65,176	1.06%	–	44,292	0.72%	6.10%	6,165,478	PA	
Rhode Island	252,525	54.41%	4	180,543	38.90%	–	14,746	3.18%	–	6,220	1.34%	–	516	0.11%	–	9,594	2.07%	–	−71,982	−15.51%	11.95%	464,144	RI	
South Carolina	855,373	40.67%	–	1,155,389	54.94%	9	49,204	2.34%	–	13,034	0.62%	–	21,016	1.00%	–	9,011	0.43%	–	300,016	14.27%	3.80%	2,103,027	SC	
South Dakota	117,458	31.74%	–	227,721	61.53%	3	20,850	5.63%	–	–	–	–	–	–	–	4,064	1.10%	–	110,263	29.79%	11.77%	370,093	SD	
Tennessee	870,695	34.72%	–	1,522,925	60.72%	11	70,397	2.81%	–	15,993	0.64%	–	11,991	0.48%	–	16,026	0.64%	–	652,230	26.00%	5.61%	2,508,027	TN	
Texas	3,877,868	43.24%	–	4,685,047	52.23%	36	283,492	3.16%	–	71,558	0.80%	–	42,366	0.47%	–	8,895	0.10%	2	807,179	8.99%	−6.80%	8,969,226	TX	
Utah	310,676	27.46%	–	515,231	45.54%	6	39,608	3.50%	–	9,438	0.83%	–	243,690	21.54%	–	12,787	1.13%	–	204,555	18.08%	−29.85%	1,131,430	UT	
Vermont	178,573	56.68%	3	95,369	30.27%	–	10,078	3.20%	–	6,758	2.14%	–	639	0.20%	–	23,650	7.51%	–	−83,204	−26.41%	9.19%	315,067	VT	
Virginia	1,981,473	49.73%	13	1,769,443	44.41%	–	118,274	2.97%	–	27,638	0.69%	–	54,054	1.36%	–	33,749	0.85%	–	−212,030	−5.32%	−1.44%	3,984,631	VA	
Washington	1,742,718	52.54%	8	1,221,747	36.83%	–	160,879	4.85%	–	58,417	1.76%	–	–	–	–	133,258	4.02%	4	−520,971	−15.71%	−0.84%	3,317,019	WA	
West Virginia	188,794	26.43%	–	489,371	68.50%	5	23,004	3.22%	–	8,075	1.13%	–	1,104	0.15%	–	4,075	0.57%	–	300,577	42.07%	15.31%	714,423	WV	
Wisconsin	1,382,536	46.45%	–	1,405,284	47.22%	10	106,674	3.58%	–	31,072	1.04%	–	11,855	0.40%	–	38,729	1.30%	–	22,748	0.77%	7.71%	2,976,150	WI	
Wyoming	55,973	21.88%	–	174,419	68.17%	3	13,287	5.19%	–	2,515	0.98%	–	–	–	–	9,655	3.78%	–	118,446	46.29%	5.47%	255,849	WY	
Total	65,853,516	48.18%	227	62,984,825	46.09%	304	4,489,221	3.28%	–	1,457,216	1.07%	–	731,788	0.54%	–	1,152,671	0.84%	7	−2,868,691	−2.10%	1.76%	136,669,237		Sources
	Clinton/Kaine Democratic			Trump/Pence Republican			Johnson/Weld Libertarian			Stein/Baraka Green			McMullin/Finn Independent			Others			Margin		Margin swing	Total votes		Sources

Two states (Maine (Note: Maine split its electoral votes for the first time since 1828.) and Nebraska) allow for their electoral votes to be split between candidates by congressional districts. The winner within each congressional district gets one electoral vote for the district. The winner of the statewide vote gets two additional electoral votes. Results are from The New York Times.

==== States and EV districts that flipped from Democratic to Republican ====
- Florida
- Iowa
- Maine's 2nd congressional district
- Michigan
- Ohio
- Pennsylvania
- Wisconsin

=== Battleground states ===
Vote margin swing by state 2012 to 2016. Only eleven states (as well as the District of Columbia and Nebraska's 2nd congressional district) shifted more Democratic. The large swing in Utah is mostly due to the votes for third-party candidate Evan McMullin and the 2012 candidacy of Mitt Romney.

Most media outlets announced the beginning of the presidential race about twenty months prior to Election Day. Soon after the first contestants declared their candidacy, Larry Sabato listed Virginia, Colorado, Iowa, New Hampshire, Florida, Nevada, and Ohio as the seven states most likely to be contested in the general election. After Donald Trump clinched the Republican presidential nomination, many pundits felt that the major campaign locations might be different from what had originally been expected.

Rust Belt states such as Pennsylvania, Wisconsin, and even Michigan were thought to be in play with Trump as the nominee, while states with large minority populations, such as Colorado and Virginia, were expected to shift towards Clinton. By the conventions period and the debates, however, it did not seem as though the Rust Belt states could deliver a victory to Trump, as many of them were considered to be part of the "blue wall" of Democratic-leaning states. Trump's courting of the Polish-American vote, a sizable number of whom were Reagan Democrats, has been cited as the cause for the loss of the Rust Belt by the Democratic nominee. According to Politico and FiveThirtyEight, his path to victory went through states such as Florida, North Carolina, Nevada, New Hampshire, and possibly Colorado.

Early polling indicated a closer-than-usual race in former Democratic strongholds such as Washington, Delaware, New Jersey, Connecticut, Maine (for the two statewide electoral votes), and New Mexico.

A consensus among political pundits developed throughout the primary election season regarding swing states. From the results of presidential elections from 2004 through to 2012, the Democratic and Republican parties would generally start with a safe electoral vote count of about 150 to 200. However, the margins required to constitute a swing state are vague, and can vary between groups of analysts. It was thought that left-leaning states in the Rust Belt could become more conservative, as Trump had strong appeal among many blue-collar workers. They represent a large portion of the American populace and were a major factor in Trump's eventual nomination. Trump's primary campaign was propelled by victories in Democratic states, and his supporters often did not identify as Republican.

Media reports indicated that both candidates planned to concentrate on Florida, Pennsylvania, Ohio and North Carolina. Among the Republican-leaning states, potential Democratic targets included Nebraska's second congressional district, Georgia, and Arizona. Trump's relatively poor polling in some traditionally Republican states, such as Utah, raised the possibility that they could vote for Clinton, despite easy wins there by recent Republican nominees. However, many analysts asserted that these states were not yet viable Democratic destinations. Several sites and individuals publish electoral predictions. These generally rate the race by the likelihood for each party to win a state. The "tossup" label is usually used to indicate that neither party has an advantage, "lean" to indicate a party has a slight edge, "likely" to indicate a party has a clear but not overwhelming advantage, and "safe" to indicate a party has an advantage that cannot be overcome.

As the parameters of the race established themselves, analysts converged on a narrower list of contested states, which were relatively similar to those of recent elections. On November 7, the Cook Political Report categorized Arizona, Colorado, Florida, Iowa, Michigan, Nevada, New Hampshire, North Carolina, Ohio, Pennsylvania, and Wisconsin as states with close races. Additionally, a district from each of Maine and Nebraska were considered to be coin flips. Meanwhile, FiveThirtyEight listed twenty-two states as potentially competitive about a month before the election—Maine's two at-large electoral votes, New Mexico, Minnesota, Michigan, Colorado, Virginia, Wisconsin, Pennsylvania, New Hampshire, Nevada, Florida, North Carolina, Ohio, Iowa, Arizona, Georgia, Alaska, South Carolina, Texas, Indiana, Missouri, and Utah—as well as Maine's second and Nebraska's second congressional districts. Nate Silver, the publication's editor-in-chief, subsequently removed Texas, South Carolina, Missouri, and Indiana from the list after the race tightened significantly. These conclusions were supported by models such as the Princeton Elections Consortium, the New York Times Upshot, and punditry evaluations from Sabato's Crystal Ball and the Cook Political Report.

Hillary Clinton won states like New Mexico by less than 10 percentage points. Among the states where the candidates finished at a margin of within seven percent, Clinton won Virginia (13 electoral votes), Colorado (9), Maine (2), Minnesota (10), and New Hampshire (4). On the other hand, Trump won Michigan (16), Pennsylvania (20), Wisconsin (10), Florida (29), North Carolina (15), Arizona (11), Nebraska's second district (1), and Georgia (16). States won by Obama in the 2012, such as Ohio (18), Iowa (6), and Maine's second district (1), were also won by Trump. The close result in Maine was not expected by most commentators, nor were Trump's victory of over 10 points in the second district and their disparities.

The dramatic shift of Midwestern states towards Trump were contrasted in the media against the relative movement of Southern states towards the Democrats. For example, former Democratic strongholds such as Minnesota and Maine leaned towards the GOP while still voting Democratic, albeit by smaller margins. Meanwhile, Iowa voted more Republican than Texas did, Georgia was more Democratic than Ohio, and the margin of victory for Trump was greater in North Carolina than Arizona.

Trump's smaller victories in Alaska and Utah also took some experts by surprise. North Dakota had the largest swing towards Trump in 2016, while Utah had the largest swing towards Clinton.

=== Close states ===
States where the margin of victory was under 1% (50 electoral votes; 46 won by Trump, 4 by Clinton):

1. Michigan, 0.23% (10,704 votes) – 16 electoral votes
2. New Hampshire, 0.37% (2,736 votes) – 4 electoral votes
3. Pennsylvania, 0.72% (44,292 votes) – 20 electoral votes (tipping point state, including two faithless GOP electors)
4. Wisconsin, 0.77% (22,748 votes) – 10 electoral votes (tipping point state, excluding the two faithless GOP electors)

States/districts where the margin of victory was between 1% and 5% (83 electoral votes; 56 won by Trump, 27 by Clinton):

1. Florida, 1.20% (112,911 votes) – 29 electoral votes
2. Minnesota, 1.52% (44,765 votes) – 10 electoral votes
3. Nebraska's 2nd congressional district, 2.24% (6,534 votes) – 1 electoral vote
4. Nevada, 2.42% (27,202 votes) – 6 electoral votes
5. Maine, 2.96% (22,142 votes) – 2 electoral votes
6. Arizona, 3.54% (91,234 votes) – 11 electoral votes
7. North Carolina, 3.66% (173,315 votes) – 15 electoral votes
8. Colorado, 4.91% (136,386 votes) – 9 electoral votes

States where the margin of victory was between 5% and 10% (94 electoral votes; 76 won by Trump, 18 by Clinton):

1. Georgia, 5.13% (211,141 votes) – 16 electoral votes
2. Virginia, 5.32% (212,030 votes) – 13 electoral votes
3. Ohio, 8.13% (446,841 votes) – 18 electoral votes
4. New Mexico, 8.22% (65,567 votes) – 5 electoral votes
5. Texas, 8.99% (807,179 votes) – 38 electoral votes
6. Iowa, 9.41% (147,314 votes) – 6 electoral votes

Red denotes states or congressional districts won by Republican Donald Trump; blue denotes those won by Democrat Hillary Clinton.

=== County statistics ===
Counties with highest percentage of Republican vote:

1. Roberts County, Texas 94.58%
2. King County, Texas 93.71%
3. Motley County, Texas 92.03%
4. Hayes County, Nebraska 91.83%
5. Shackelford County, Texas 91.62%

Counties and county-equivalents with highest percentage of Democratic vote:

1. Washington, D.C. 90.86%
2. Bronx County, New York 88.52%
3. Prince George's County, Maryland 88.13%
4. Petersburg, Virginia 87.20%
5. Claiborne County, Mississippi 86.80%

=== Maps ===
Results by state, shaded according to winning candidate's percentage of the vote

Results by state, shaded according to margin of victory

Results by vote distribution among states. The size of each state's pie chart is proportional to its number of electoral votes.

A discontinuous cartogram of the 2016 United States presidential election, scaled by their Electoral College contribution

A discretized cartogram of the 2016 United States presidential election using squares

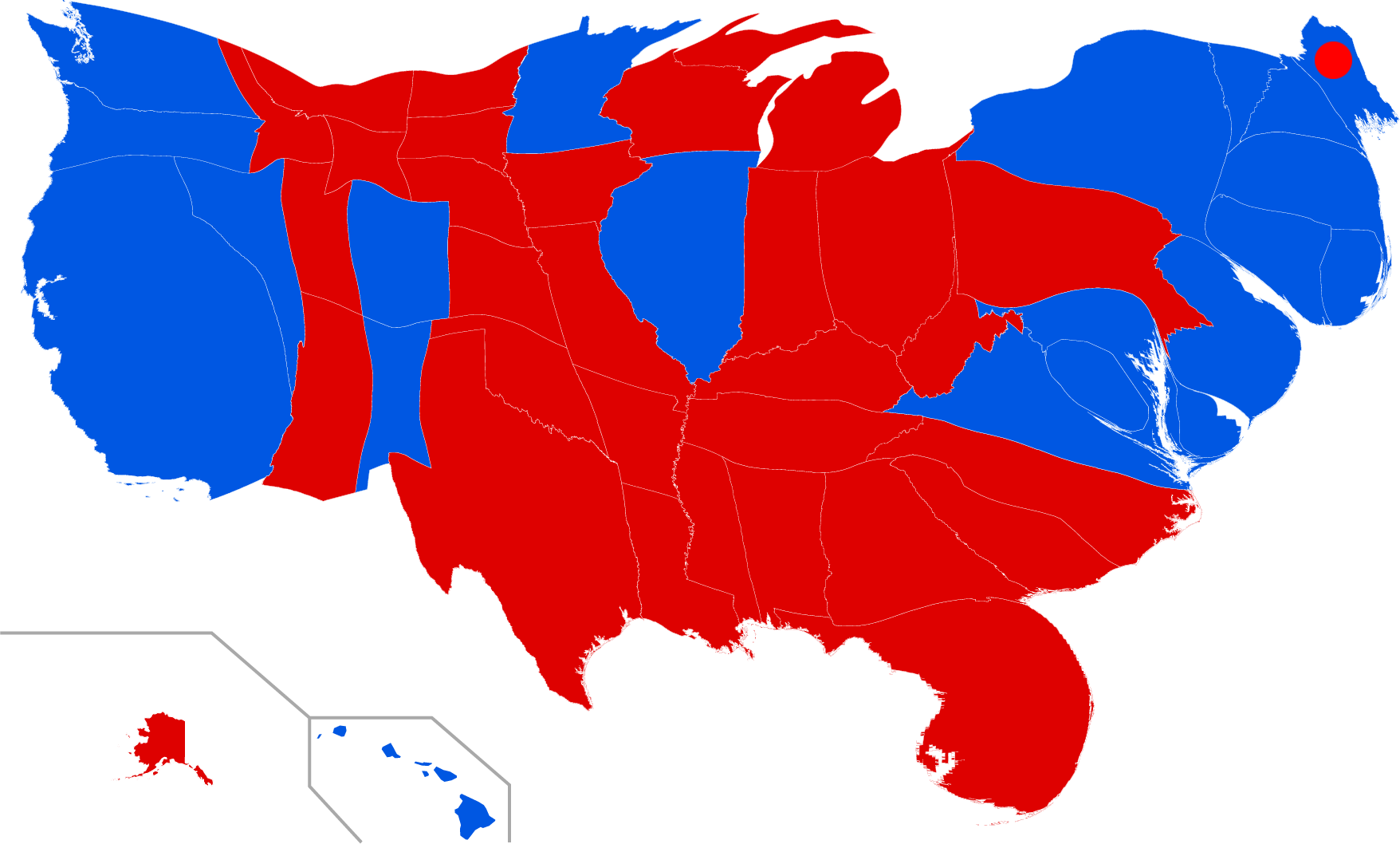
A continuous cartogram of the 2016 United States presidential election

A discretized cartogram of the 2016 United States presidential election using hexagons

Results by county. (Note: Alaska and Louisiana do not have counties. Alaska's boroughs and census areas and Louisiana's parishes are pictured.) Red denotes counties that went to Trump; blue denotes counties that went to Clinton.

Results by county, shaded according to winning candidate's percentage of the vote

Results by county flips from 2012 to the 2016 presidential election

Margin swing in each state between the 2012 and 2016 presidential elections

County swing from 2012 to 2016

Results of election by congressional district, shaded by winning candidate's percentage of the vote

Results by county, shaded according to percentage of the vote for Gary Johnson

Results by county, shaded according to percentage of the vote for Jill Stein

Results by county, shaded according to percentage of the vote for Evan McMullin

=== Viewership ===
The 2016 election was highly viewed, setting viewership records on CNN and Fox News. Over 28 million people watched the election on cable television, with 63.99 million viewers including broadcast television. While more highly viewed than 2012 (60.86 million viewers), it was less viewed than 2008 (71.5 million viewers).

Legend

cable news network
broadcast network

Total television viewers
8:00 to 11:00 p.m. EST

Network	Viewers
CNN	13,258,000
FNC	12,112,000
NBC	11,152,000
ABC	9,236,000
CBS	8,008,000
MSNBC	5,945,000
Fox	4,196,000

Total cable TV viewers
2:00 to 3:00 a.m. EST

Network	Viewers
FNC	9,778,000
CNN	6,452,000
MSNBC	2,858,000

Cable TV viewers 25 to 54
2:00 to 3:00 a.m. EST

Network	Viewers
FNC	3,955,000
CNN	3,372,000
MSNBC	1,207,000

== Exit poll ==
Voter demographic data for 2016 were collected by Edison Research for the National Election Pool, a consortium of ABC News, CBS News, MSNBC, CNN, Fox News, and the Associated Press. The voter survey is based on exit polls completed by 24,537 voters leaving 350 voting places throughout the United States on Election Day, in addition to 4,398 telephone interviews with early and absentee voters. Trump's crucial victories in the Midwest were aided in large part by his strong margins among non-college whites—while Obama lost those voters by a margin of 10 points in 2012, Clinton lost this group by 20 percent.

The election also represented the first time that Republicans performed better among lower-income whites than among affluent white voters. Clinton however had the majority amongst lower-income Americans overall.

Voters 40 years of age or older (born in 1976 or earlier) were estimated to comprise 64% of the electorate in the exit poll. The Pew Research Center later showed that the Greatest Generation, the Silent Generation, Baby boomers, and Generation X accounted for 155 million of the 224 million eligible voters (or approximately 69%). Baby boomers and Generation X alone comprised 127 million of the eligible voters (or approximately 57%). There was an age gap, with Clinton winning voters under the age of 40, while Trump won voters over the age of 40.

Trump narrowed Clinton's margin compared to Obama by seven points among blacks and African-Americans, eight points among Latinos, and 11 points among Asian-Americans. Meanwhile, Trump increased his lead with non-Hispanic white voters through one percent over Mitt Romney's performance, and American Indians, Alaska Natives, and Pacific Islanders shifted their support towards the Republican candidate using the same relative amount. Additionally, although 74 percent of Muslim voters supported Clinton, Trump nearly doubled his support among those voters compared to Mitt Romney at 13 percent, according to the Council on American–Islamic Relations exit poll.

However, "more convincing data" from the polling firm Latino Decisions indicates that Clinton received a higher share of the Hispanic vote, and Trump a lower share, than the Edison exit polls showed. Using wider, more geographically and linguistically representative sampling, Latino Decisions concluded that Clinton won 79% of Hispanic voters (also an improvement over Obama's share in 2008 and 2012), while Trump won only 18% (lower than previous Republicans such as Romney and McCain). Additionally, the 2016 Cooperative Congressional Election Study found that Clinton's share of the Hispanic vote was one percentage point higher than Obama's in 2012, while Trump's was seven percentage points lower than Romney's.

Similarly, a large, multi-lingual study by the Asian American Legal Defense and Education Fund found that Clinton won 79% of Asian-American voters, higher than the Edison exit poll showed, while Trump won only 18%, a decrease from McCain's and Romney's numbers. Furthermore, according to the AALDEF's report, Trump received merely 2% of the Muslim-American vote, whereas Clinton received 97%. The low percentage of Muslim votes for Trump may have been influenced by much of his rhetoric during the campaign regarding Muslims and Islam. The issue of islamophobia was demonstrated to be an important political issue for Muslim voters; an ISPU study done in 2016 found that, "...outside the issues of discrimination and Islamophobia there aren't, like, one or two big issues that unite all Muslims".

2016 presidential election exit poll results (Edison)
Response category	Clinton	Trump	Other	% of total vote
Total vote	48	46	6	100
Ideology
Liberals	84	10	6	26
Moderates	52	41	7	39
Conservatives	15	81	4	35
Party
Democrats	89	9	2	37
Republicans	7	90	3	33
Independents	41	47	12	31
Party by gender
Democratic men	87	10	3	14
Democratic women	90	8	2	23
Republican men	6	90	4	17
Republican women	9	89	2	16
Independent men	37	51	12	17
Independent women	46	43	11	14
Gender
Men	41	52	7	47
Women	54	41	5	53
Marital status
Married	44	52	4	59
Unmarried	55	37	8	41
Gender by marital status
Married men	37	58	5	29
Married women	49	47	4	30
Non-married men	46	45	9	19
Non-married women	61	32	7	23
Race/ethnicity
White	37	57	6	70
Black	88	8	4	12
Asian	65	29	6	4
Other	56	37	7	3
Hispanic (of any race)	65	29	6	11
Gender by race/ethnicity
White men	31	62	7	34
White women	43	52	5	37
Black men	80	13	7	5
Black women	94	4	2	7
Latino men (of any race)	62	32	6	5
Latina women (of any race)	68	26	6	6
All other races	61	32	7	6
Religion
Protestant	37	59	4	27
Catholic	45	52	3	23
Mormon	25	59	16	1
Other Christian	41	55	4	24
Jewish	71	24	5	3
Muslim	74	13	1	1
Other religion	58	31	11	7
None	67	26	7	15
Religious service attendance
Weekly or more	40	54	6	33
Monthly	46	49	5	16
A few times a year	48	46	6	29
Never	62	31	7	22
White evangelical or born-again Christian
White evangelical or born-again Christian	16	81	3	26
Everyone else	58	35	7	74
Age
18–24 years old	56	35	9	10
25–29 years old	53	39	8	9
30–39 years old	51	40	9	17
40–49 years old	46	49	5	19
50–64 years old	44	53	3	30
65 and older	45	53	2	15
Age by race
Whites 18–29 years old	43	47	10	12
Whites 30–44 years old	37	54	9	16
Whites 45–64 years old	34	62	4	30
Whites 65 and older	39	58	3	13
Blacks 18–29 years old	85	9	6	3
Blacks 30–44 years old	89	7	4	4
Blacks 45–64 years old	89	7	4	5
Blacks 65 and older	91	9	n/a	1
Latinos 18–29 years old	67	26	7	3
Latinos 30–44 years old	65	28	7	4
Latinos 45–64 years old	64	32	4	4
Latinos 65 and older	73	25	2	1
Others	61	32	7	6
Sexual orientation
LGBT	77	14	9	5
Heterosexual	47	48	5	95
First time voter
First time voter	54	39	7	10
Everyone else	47	47	6	90
Education
High school or less	44	51	5	18
Some college education	42	52	6	32
College graduate	49	45	6	32
Postgraduate education	58	36	6	18
Education by race/ethnicity
White college graduates	45	49	6	37
White no college degree	28	67	5	34
Non-white college graduates	71	22	7	13
Non-white no college degree	75	20	5	16
Education by race/ethnicity/sex
White women with college degrees	51	45	4	20
White men with college degrees	39	53	8	17
White women without college degrees	34	61	5	17
White men without college degrees	23	71	6	16
Non-whites	74	21	5	29
Family income
Under $30,000	53	41	6	17
$30,000–49,999	51	42	7	19
$50,000–99,999	46	48	6	31
$100,000–199,999	47	48	5	24
$200,000–249,999	48	49	3	4
Over $250,000	46	48	6	6
Union households
Union	51	42	7	18
Non-union	46	48	6	82
Military service
Veterans	34	60	6	13
Non-veterans	50	44	6	87
Region
Northeast	55	40	5	19
Midwest	44	49	7	23
South	44	52	4	37
West	53	39	8	21
Community size
Cities (population 50,000 and above)	59	35	6	34
Suburbs	45	49	6	49
Rural areas	32	62	6	17
Obama job approval
Strongly approve	93	4	3	33
Somewhat approve	69	20	11	20
Somewhat disapprove	14	77	9	12
Strongly disapprove	3	93	4	33
Direction of the country
Wrong track	26	68	6	62
Right direction	89	7	4	33
Life for the next generation of Americans will be
Better than today	59	38	3	37
About the same	54	38	8	25
Worse than today	31	63	6	33
Feelings about the federal government
Angry	18	75	7	23
Dissatisfied	46	48	6	46
Satisfied	76	19	6	24
Enthusiastic	78	19	3	6
Opinion of the role of government
Government doing too much	22	72	4	50
Government should do more	74	22	4	45
Next president should
Be more conservative	13	82	5	47
Continue Obama's policies	91	5	4	28
Be more liberal	69	23	8	17
Decided on presidential vote
Before September	52	45	3	60
In September	46	48	6	12
In October	37	51	12	12
Last week	41	49	10	5
Last few days	43	43	14	8
Importance of presidential debates to your vote
Most important factor	51	47	2	25
An important factor	50	45	5	38
A minor factor	37	58	5	19
Not a factor	41	49	10	11
Quality of candidate that mattered most
Can bring change	14	82	4	39
Right experience	90	7	3	22
Good judgment	65	25	10	20
Cares about me	57	34	9	15
Opinion of presidential candidate voted for
Strongly favor	53	41	6	41
Have reservations	49	48	3	32
Dislike opponents	39	50	11	25
Candidate viewed as honest
Clinton is honest	97	1	2	34
Trump is honest	2	98	N/A	31
Neither are honest	40	43	17	29
Both are honest	N/A	N/A	N/A	2
Candidate viewed as qualified
Clinton is qualified	94	2	4	46
Trump is qualified	1	98	1	32
Neither are qualified	15	66	19	15
Both are qualified	22	71	7	5
Candidate viewed as having temperament to be President
Clinton does	90	5	5	49
Trump does	2	97	1	29
Neither does	12	67	21	14
Both do	20	77	3	5
Clinton's use of private email for official use bothers you
A lot	7	86	7	45
Some	68	25	7	18
Not much	88	7	5	17
Not at all	93	5	2	19
Donald Trump's treatment of women bothers you
A lot	83	11	6	50
Some	20	73	7	20
Not much	8	88	4	13
Not at all	11	86	3	16
Issue regarded as most important
Economy	52	42	6	52
Terrorism	39	57	4	18
Foreign policy	52	34	14	13
Immigration	32	64	4	13
Condition of national economy
Poor	15	79	6	21
Not good	40	53	7	41
Good	76	18	6	33
Excellent	83	16	1	3
Financial situation compared to four years ago
Better today	72	23	5	31
About the same	47	45	8	41
Worse today	19	77	2	25
Candidate that would better handle the economy
Clinton	95	1	4	46
Trump	3	94	3	48
View of how the war against ISIS is going
Very badly	12	83	5	24
Somewhat badly	37	55	8	28
Somewhat well	71	24	5	35
Very well	85	11	6	4
Candidate that would better handle foreign policy
Clinton	86	7	7	53
Trump	2	96	2	42
Effect of international trade
Takes away U.S. jobs	32	64	4	42
Creates U.S. jobs	59	35	6	39
Does not affect jobs	65	30	5	11
Illegal immigrants working in the U.S. should be
Offered chance at legal status	61	33	6	70
Deported to home country	14	83	3	25
View of U.S. wall along the entire Mexican border
Support	10	85	5	41
Oppose	76	16	8	54
Importance of Supreme Court appointments to vote
The most important factor	41	56	3	21
An important factor	49	46	5	48
A minor factor	49	40	11	14
Not a factor at all	55	37	8	14
The country's criminal justice system
Treats blacks unfairly	72	22	6	48
Treats all fairly	23	73	4	43
View of Obamacare
Went too far	23	73	4	47
Was about right	83	10	7	18
Did not go far enough	78	18	4	30
Confidence in vote count
Very confident	68	27	5	47
Somewhat confident	33	61	6	37
Not very confident	25	68	7	11
Not at all confident	28	57	15	4

== Election forecasts ==
Final polling averages for the 2016 election by state. Polls from lightly shaded states are older than September 1, 2016.: Hillary Clinton / 216; Donald Trump / 184; Margin of error between Clinton and Trump / 134; No data / 4

Various methods were used to forecast the outcome of the 2016 election. There were many competing election forecast approaches including Nate Silver's FiveThirtyEight, The Upshot at The New York Times, Daily Kos, Princeton Election Consortium, Cook Political Report, Rothenberg and Gonzales, PollyVote, Sabato's Crystal Ball and Electoral-Vote. These models mostly showed a Democratic advantage since the nominees were confirmed, and were supported by pundits and statisticians, including Nate Silver of FiveThirtyEight, Nate Cohn at The New York Times, and Larry Sabato from the Crystal Ball newsletter, who predicted a Democratic victory in competitive presidential races and projected consistent leads in several battleground states around the country. However, FiveThirtyEight's model pointed to the possibility of an Electoral College-popular vote split widening in the final weeks based on Trump's improvement in swing states like Florida or Pennsylvania. This was due to the demographics targeted by Trump's campaign which lived in big numbers there, in addition to Clinton's poor performance in several of those swing states in comparison with Obama's performance in 2012, as well as having a big number of her potential voters in very populated traditionally 'blue' states, but also in some very populated states traditionally 'red', like Texas, which were projected safe for Trump.

Early exit polls generally favored Clinton. After the polls closed and some of the results came in, the forecasts were found to be inaccurate, as Trump performed better in the competitive Midwestern states, such as Iowa, Ohio, and Minnesota, than expected. Three Rust Belt states (Pennsylvania, Wisconsin and Michigan) which were considered to be part of Clinton's firewall, were narrowly won by Trump. Of the states in the Great Lakes region, Clinton won the swing state of Minnesota by one point, as well as traditional Democratic strongholds such as New York and Illinois with populous urban centers. This result stands in contrast to that of 2012, when President Barack Obama won all but Indiana, which he narrowly carried in 2008. This table displays the final polling average published by Real Clear Politics on November 7, the actual electoral margin, and the over-performance by either candidate relative to the polls.

State	Electoral votes	Polling average	Final result	Difference
Arizona	11	Trump +4	Trump +3.5	Clinton +0.5
Colorado	9	Clinton +2.9	Clinton +4.9	Clinton +2
Florida	29	Trump +0.2	Trump +1.2	Trump +1
Georgia	16	Trump +4.8	Trump +5.1	Trump +0.3
Iowa	6	Trump +3	Trump +9.5	Trump +6.5
Maine	4	Clinton +4.5	Clinton +2.9	Trump +1.6
Michigan	16	Clinton +3.4	Trump +0.3	Trump +3.7
Minnesota	10	Clinton +6.2	Clinton +1.5	Trump +4.7
Nevada	6	Trump +0.8	Clinton +2.4	Clinton +3.2
New Hampshire	4	Clinton +0.6	Clinton +0.3	Trump +0.3
New Mexico	5	Clinton +5	Clinton +8.3	Clinton +3.3
North Carolina	15	Trump +1	Trump +3.7	Trump +2.7
Ohio	18	Trump +3.5	Trump +8.1	Trump +4.6
Pennsylvania	20	Clinton +1.9	Trump +0.7	Trump +2.6
Virginia	13	Clinton +5	Clinton +5.4	Clinton +0.4
Wisconsin	10	Clinton +6.5	Trump +0.7	Trump +7.2

Many pollsters were puzzled by the failure of mainstream forecasting models to predict the outcome of the 2016 election. Some journalists compared the 2016 election to the failure of prognosticator Arthur Henning in the "Dewey Defeats Truman" incident from the 1948 presidential election. Sean Trende, writing for RealClearPolitics, wrote that many of the polls were accurate, but that the pundits' interpretation of these polls neglected polling error. Nate Silver found that the high number of undecided and third-party voters in the election was neglected in many of these models, and that many of these voters decided to vote for Trump. According to a February 2018 study by Public Opinion Quarterly, the main sources of polling error were "a late swing in vote preference toward Trump and a pervasive failure to adjust for over-representation of college graduates (who favored Clinton)", whereas the share of "shy" Trump voters (who declined to admit their support for Trump to the pollsters) proved to be negligible. Political scientist Lloyd Gruber said, "One of the major casualties of the 2016 election season has been the reputation of political science, a discipline whose practitioners had largely dismissed Donald Trump's chances of gaining the Republican nomination". Trump said that he was surprised, and added "I always used to believe in [polls]. I don't believe them anymore."

FiveThirtyEight's final polls-plus forecast predicted 18 states, plus the second congressional districts of Maine and Nebraska, with an interval of confidence lower than 90%. However, every major forecaster, including FiveThirtyEight, The New York Times Upshot, prediction markets aggregator PredictWise, ElectionBettingOdds from Maxim Lott and John Stossel, the DailyKos, the Princeton Election Consortium, the Huffington Post, the Cook Political Report, Larry Sabato's Crystal Ball, and the Rothenberg and Gonzales Report, called every state the same way (although Cook and Rothenberg-Gonzales left two and five states as toss-ups, respectively). The lone exception was Maine's 2nd congressional district. Of the forecasters who published results on the district, the Times gave Trump a 64% chance of winning and PredictWise a 52% chance, FiveThirtyEight gave Clinton a 51% chance of winning in polls-only and 54% in polls-plus, Princeton gave her a 60% chance, Cook labelled it a toss-up, and Sabato leaned it towards Trump. The following table displays the final winning probabilities given by each outlet, along with the final electoral result. The states shown have been identified by Politico, WhipBoard, The New York Times, and the Crystal Ball as battlegrounds.

Elections analysts and political pundits issue probabilistic forecasts of the composition of the Electoral College. These forecasts use a variety of factors to estimate the likelihood of each candidate winning the Electoral College electors for that state. Most election predictors use the following ratings:

- "tossup": no advantage
- "tilt" (used by some predictors): advantage that is not quite as strong as "lean"
- "lean" or "leans": slight advantage
- "likely": significant, but surmountable, advantage
- "safe" or "solid": near-certain chance of victory

Below is a list of states considered by one or more forecasts to be competitive; states that are deemed to be "safe" or "solid" by forecasters Sabato's Crystal Ball, New York Times, Princeton Election Consortium, PredictWise, and FiveThirtyEight.

State	The New York Times Upshot	FiveThirtyEight	PredictWise	Princeton Election Consortium	Sabato's Crystal Ball	2012 margin	2016 margin
Alaska	Likely R	Likely R	Likely R	Safe R	Likely R	R+14	R+15
Arizona	Likely R	Lean R	Likely R	Likely R	Lean R	R+9	R+4
Colorado	Likely D	Likely D	Safe D	Safe D	Likely D	D+5	D+5
Florida	Lean D	Tossup	Likely D	Lean D	Lean D	D+1	R+1 (flip)
Georgia	Likely R	Likely R	Likely R	Likely R	Likely R	R+8	R+6
Iowa	Lean R (flip)	Lean R (flip)	Likely R (flip)	Lean R (flip)	Lean R (flip)	D+6	R+10 (flip)
Maine	Likely D	Likely D	Safe D	Safe D	Likely D	D+15	D+3
ME-2	Lean R (flip)	Tossup	Tossup	Lean D	Lean R (flip)	D+9	R+10 (flip)
Michigan	Likely D	Likely D	Likely D	Likely D	Lean D	D+9	R+1 (flip)
Minnesota	Likely D	Likely D	Safe D	Safe D	Likely D	D+8	D+2
NE-2	Likely R	Tossup	Likely R	Likely R	Lean R	R+7	R+3
New Mexico	Safe D	Likely D	Safe D	Likely D	Likely D	D+10	D+8
Nevada	Lean D	Tossup	Likely D	Likely D	Lean D	D+7	D+2
New Hampshire	Likely D	Lean D	Likely D	Lean D	Lean D	D+6	D+1
North Carolina	Lean D (flip)	Tossup	Lean D (flip)	Lean D (flip)	Lean D (flip)	R+2	R+4
Ohio	Tossup	Lean R (flip)	Lean R (flip)	Lean R (flip)	Lean R (flip)	D+3	R+9 (flip)
Pennsylvania	Likely D	Likely D	Likely D	Likely D	Lean D	D+5	R+1 (flip)
Utah	Lean R	Likely R	Likely R	Safe R	Lean R	R+48	R+18
Virginia	Safe D	Likely D	Safe D	Safe D	Likely D	D+4	D+5
Wisconsin	Likely D	Likely D	Safe D	Safe D	Likely D	D+7	R+1 (flip)
Overall	D: 288; R: 225; Tossup: 18	D: 267; R: 212; Tossup: 52	D: 317; R: 213; Tossup: 1	D: 318; R: 213; Tossup: 0	D: 317; R: 214; Tossup: 0	D: 332; R: 206	D: 232; R: 306

== Post-election events and controversies ==
Trump's victory, considered unlikely by most forecasts, was characterized as an "upset" and as "shocking" by news organizations. Trump himself thought he would lose even as the polls were closing.

=== Protests ===
News report about the protests in Los Angeles on November 12 from Voice of America

Following the announcement of Trump's election, large protests broke out across the United States with some continuing for several days.

Protesters held up a number of different signs and chanted various shouts including "Not my president" and "We don't accept the president-elect". The movement organized on Twitter under the hashtags #Antitrump and #NotMyPresident.

High school and college students walked out of classes to protest. At a few protests fires were lit, flags and other items were burned and people yelled derogatory remarks about Trump. Rioters also broke glass at certain locations. Celebrities such as Madonna, Cher, and Lady Gaga took part in New York. Kendrick Lamar's song "Alright" was used repeatedly by protestors, despite the movement receiving no endorsement from Lamar himself. Some protesters took to blocking freeways in Los Angeles, San Diego, and Portland, Oregon, and were dispersed by police in the early hours of the morning. In a number of cities, protesters were dispersed with rubber bullets, pepper spray and bean-bags fired by police. In New York City, calls were made to continue the protests over the coming days after the election. Los Angeles mayor Eric Garcetti expressed understanding of the protests and praised those who peacefully wanted to make their voices heard.

=== Vote tampering concerns ===
"How Hard Is It to Hack the US Election" video report from Voice of America, November 5 (three days before the election)

After the election, computer scientists, including J. Alex Halderman, the director of the University of Michigan Center for Computer Security and Society, urged the Clinton campaign to request an election recount in Wisconsin, Michigan, and Pennsylvania (three swing states where Trump had won narrowly) for the purpose of excluding the possibility that the hacking of electronic voting machines had influenced the recorded outcome. However, statistician Nate Silver performed a regression analysis which demonstrated that the alleged discrepancy between paper ballots and electronic voting machines "completely disappears once you control for race and education level". On November 25, the Obama administration said the results from November 8 "accurately reflect the will of the American people". The following day, the White House released another statement, saying: "the federal government did not observe any increased level of malicious cyberactivity aimed at disrupting our electoral process on Election Day".

In the years following the election, Hillary Clinton has alleged that official maleficence contributed to and may have caused her electoral loss, saying in 2022, "Literally within hours of the polls closing in 2016, we had so much evidence pouring in about voters being turned away in Milwaukee and not being able to vote in Detroit. These states were run by Republicans so there was no way to find out the truth about any of them".

Donald Trump and New Hampshire governor Chris Sununu both complained that liberal voters from Massachusetts were illegally bused into New Hampshire for the 2016 election, and Scott Brown blamed the same phenomenon for losing his senate race in 2014. The New Hampshire Secretary of State and New Hampshire Department of Justice issued a report in 2018 regarding complaints of voters being bused in from Vermont, Maine, and Massachusetts for the 2016 election. They found that in every case, field inspectors were able to determine that the voters were from New Hampshire, though they were riding a bus operated by an out-of-state company (which has its name and address written on the outside of the bus, presumably the source of the confusion). Out of 743,000 votes cast, four were determined to be cast illegally, either because the voters were told to go to the wrong location, or because the voter believed they were able to vote in each town in which they owned property. Out of about 6,000 same-day voter registrations in the state, the report says only 66 voters could not have their residency confirmed (though fraud is not the only explanation for such a failure).

=== Recount petitions ===
On November 23, Green Party presidential candidate Jill Stein launched a public fundraiser to pay for recounts in Wisconsin, Michigan, and Pennsylvania, asserting that the election's outcome had been affected by hacking in those states; Stein did not provide evidence for her claims. Changing the outcome of these three states would make Clinton the winner, and this would require showing that fewer than 60,000 votes had been counted for Trump which should have been counted for Clinton. Stein filed for a recount in Wisconsin on November 25, after which Clinton campaign general counsel Marc Elias said their campaign would join Stein's recount efforts in that state and possibly others "in order to ensure the process proceeds in a manner that is fair to all sides". Stein subsequently filed for a recount in Pennsylvania on November 28, and in Michigan on November 30. Concurrently, American Delta Party/Reform Party presidential candidate Rocky De La Fuente sought and was granted a partial recount in Nevada that was unrelated to Stein's efforts.

President-elect Donald Trump issued a statement denouncing Stein's Wisconsin recount request saying, "The people have spoken and the election is over". Trump further commented that the recount "is a scam by the Green Party for an election that has already been conceded". The Trump campaign and Republican Party officials moved to block Stein's three recount efforts through state and federal courts.

U.S. District Judge Mark Goldsmith ordered a halt to the recount in Michigan on December 7, dissolving a previous temporary restraining order against the Michigan Board of Elections that allowed the recount to continue, stating in his order: "Plaintiffs have not presented evidence of tampering or mistake. Instead, they present speculative claims going to the vulnerability of the voting machinery—but not actual injury". On December 12, U.S. District Judge Paul Diamond rejected an appeal by the Green Party and Jill Stein to force a recount in Pennsylvania, stating that suspicion of a hacked Pennsylvania election "borders on the irrational" and that granting the Green Party's recount bid could "ensure that no Pennsylvania vote counts" given the December 13, federal deadline to certify the vote for the Electoral College. Meanwhile, the Wisconsin recount was allowed to continue as it was nearing completion and had uncovered no significant irregularities.

The recounts in Wisconsin and Nevada were completed on schedule, resulting in only minor changes to vote tallies. A partial recount of Michigan ballot found some precinct imbalances in Detroit, which were corrected. A subsequent state audit found no evidence of voter fraud and concluded that the mistakes, which were "almost entirely" caused by poll-worker mistakes attributed to poor training, did not impair "the ability of Detroit residents to cast a ballot and have their vote counted". The overall outcome of the election remained unchanged by the recount efforts.

=== Electoral College lobbying ===
Intense lobbying (in one case involving claims of harassment and death threats) and grass-roots campaigns were directed at various GOP electors of the United States Electoral College to convince a sufficient number of them (37) to not vote for Trump, thus precluding a Trump presidency. Members of the Electoral College themselves started a campaign for other members to "vote their conscience for the good of America" in accordance with Alexander Hamilton's Federalist Paper No. 68. Former candidate Lawrence Lessig and attorney Laurence Tribe established The Electors Trust on December 5 under the aegis of Equal Citizens to provide pro bono legal counsel as well as a secure communications platform for members of the Electoral College who were considering a vote of conscience against Trump.

On December 6, Colorado Secretary of State Wayne W. Williams castigated Democratic electors who had filed a lawsuit in Federal court to have the state law binding them to the popular vote (in their case for Hillary Clinton) overturned.

On December 10, ten electors, in an open letter headed by Christine Pelosi to the Director of National Intelligence James Clapper, demanded an intelligence briefing in light of Russian interference in the election to help Trump win the presidency. Fifty-eight additional electors subsequently added their names to the letter, bringing the total to 68 electors from 17 different states. On December 16, the briefing request was denied.

On December 19, several electors voted against their pledged candidates: two against Trump and five against Clinton. A further three electors attempted to vote against Clinton but were replaced or forced to vote again. The 115th United States Congress officially certified the results on January 6, 2017.

=== Faithless electors ===
In the Electoral College vote on December 19, for the first time since the ratification of the 12th Amendment, multiple faithless electors voted against their pledged qualified presidential candidate. (Note: The 1872 presidential election also saw multiple electors vote for a different candidate than that pledged, due to the death of Liberal Republican candidate Horace Greeley, after the popular vote, yet before the meeting of the Electoral College. Greeley still garnered three posthumous electoral votes which Congress subsequently dismissed.) Five Democrats rebelled in Washington and Hawaii, while two Republicans rebelled in Texas. Two Democratic electors, one in Minnesota and one in Colorado, were replaced after voting for Bernie Sanders and John Kasich, respectively. Electors in Maine conducted a second vote after one of its members voted for Sanders; the elector then voted for Clinton. Likewise, for the first time since 1896, (Note: Not including 1912, because of the death of James S. Sherman.) multiple faithless electors voted against the pledged qualified vice presidential candidate.

- One Clinton elector in Colorado attempted to vote for John Kasich. The single vote was ruled invalid by Colorado state law, the elector was dismissed, and an alternative elector was sworn in who voted for Clinton.
- One Clinton elector in Minnesota voted for Bernie Sanders as president and Tulsi Gabbard as vice president; his votes were discarded and he was replaced by an alternate who voted for Clinton.
- One Clinton elector in Maine voted for Bernie Sanders; this vote was invalidated as "improper" and the elector subsequently voted for Clinton.
- Four Clinton electors in Washington did not vote for Clinton (three votes went to Colin Powell, and one to Faith Spotted Eagle).
- One Trump elector in Georgia resigned before the vote rather than vote for Trump and was replaced by an alternate.
- Two Trump electors in Texas did not vote for Trump (one vote went to John Kasich, one to Ron Paul); one elector did not vote for Pence and instead voted for Carly Fiorina for vice president; a third resigned before the vote rather than vote for Trump and was replaced by an alternate.
- One Clinton elector in Hawaii voted for Bernie Sanders.

Of the faithless votes, Colin Powell and Elizabeth Warren were the only two to receive more than one; Powell received three electoral votes for president and Warren received two for vice president. Receiving one valid electoral vote each were Sanders, John Kasich, Ron Paul and Faith Spotted Eagle for president, and Carly Fiorina, Susan Collins, Winona LaDuke and Maria Cantwell for vice president. Sanders is the first Jewish American to receive an electoral vote for president. LaDuke is the first Green Party member to receive an electoral vote, and Paul is the third member of the Libertarian Party to do so, following the party's presidential and vice-presidential nominees each getting one vote in 1972. It is the first election with faithless electors from more than one political party.

State	Party	Presidential vote	Vice presidential vote	Name of elector	References
Nationwide		Donald Trump, 304	Mike Pence, 305	Pledged	
Nationwide		Hillary Clinton, 227	Tim Kaine, 227	Pledged	
Hawaii		Bernie Sanders (I-VT)	Elizabeth Warren (D-MA)	David Mulinix	
Texas		John Kasich (R-OH)	Carly Fiorina (R-VA)	Christopher Suprun	
Texas		Ron Paul (L-TX / R-TX)	Mike Pence (as pledged)	Bill Greene	
Washington		Colin Powell (R-VA) (Note: Powell has several homes, including one in NYC (still) and also one in DC, but is officially a VA resident per WikiLeaks emails, and per his 'verified' social media account.)	Maria Cantwell (D-WA)	Levi Guerra	
Washington		Colin Powell (R-VA)	Susan Collins (R-ME)	Esther John	
Washington		Colin Powell (R-VA)	Elizabeth Warren (D-MA)	Bret Chiafalo	
Washington		Faith Spotted Eagle (D-SD)	Winona LaDuke (G-MN)	Robert Satiacum Jr.	

=== Democratic objections to vote certification ===
On January 6, 2017, a Joint Session of Congress was held to count the Electoral College votes, pursuant to the Electoral Count Act. This count was unusual for the many unsuccessful objections raised by Democratic members of the House of Representatives, alleging voter suppression and foreign interference.

=== Handling of illegal votes ===
Critics alleged racial bias after comparing the different sentences handed down to two white people and one black person who were convicted of attempting to vote illegally in the 2016 presidential election.

=== Involvement of other countries ===
==== Russian involvement ====
On December 9, 2016, the Central Intelligence Agency issued an assessment to lawmakers in the US Senate, stating that a Russian entity hacked the DNC and John Podesta's emails to assist Donald Trump. The Federal Bureau of Investigation agreed. President Barack Obama ordered a "full review" into such possible intervention. Director of National Intelligence James R. Clapper in early January 2017 testified before a Senate committee that Russia's meddling in the 2016 presidential campaign went beyond hacking, and included disinformation and the dissemination of fake news, often promoted on social media. Facebook revealed that during the 2016 United States presidential election, a Russian company funded by Yevgeny Prigozhin, a Russian businessman with ties to Vladimir Putin, had purchased advertisements on the website for US$100,000, 25% of which were geographically targeted to the U.S.

President-elect Trump originally called the report fabricated. Julian Assange said the Russian government was not the source of the documents. Days later, Trump said he could be convinced of the Russian hacking "if there is a unified presentation of evidence from the Federal Bureau of Investigation and other agencies".

Several U.S. senators—including Republicans John McCain, Richard Burr, and Lindsey Graham—demanded a congressional investigation. The Senate Intelligence Committee announced the scope of their bipartisan official inquiry on December 13, which began on January 24, 2017.

A formal Special Counsel investigation headed by former FBI director Robert Mueller was initiated in May 2017 to uncover the detailed interference operations by Russia, and to determine whether any people associated with the Trump campaign were complicit in the Russian efforts. When questioned by Chuck Todd on Meet the Press in March 2017, Clapper declared that intelligence investigations on Russian interference performed by the FBI, CIA, NSA and his ODNI office had found no evidence of collusion between the Trump campaign and Russia. Mueller concluded his investigation on March 22, 2019, by submitting his report to Attorney General William Barr.

On March 24, 2019, Barr submitted a letter describing Mueller's conclusions, and on April 18, 2019, a redacted version of the Mueller report was released to the public. It concluded that Russian interference in the 2016 presidential election did occur "in sweeping and systematic fashion" and "violated U.S. criminal law".

The first method detailed in the final report was the usage of the Internet Research Agency, waging "a social media campaign that favored presidential candidate Donald J. Trump and disparaged presidential candidate Hillary Clinton". The Internet Research Agency also sought to "provoke and amplify political and social discord in the United States".

The second method of Russian interference saw the Russian intelligence service, the GRU, hacking into email accounts owned by volunteers and employees of the Clinton presidential campaign, including that of campaign chairman John Podesta, and also hacking into "the computer networks of the Democratic Congressional Campaign Committee (DCCC) and the Democratic National Committee (DNC)". As a result, the GRU obtained hundreds of thousands of hacked documents, and the GRU proceeded by arranging releases of damaging hacked material via the WikiLeaks organization and also GRU's personas "DCLeaks" and "Guccifer 2.0". To establish whether a crime was committed by members of the Trump campaign with regard to Russian interference, the special counsel's investigators "applied the framework of conspiracy law", and not the concept of "collusion", because collusion "is not a specific offense or theory of liability found in the United States Code, nor is it a term of art in federal criminal law". They also investigated if members of the Trump campaign "coordinated" with Russia, using the definition of "coordination" as having "an agreement—tacit or express—between the Trump campaign and the Russian government on election interference". Investigators further elaborated that merely having "two parties taking actions that were informed by or responsive to the other's actions or interests" was not enough to establish coordination.

The Mueller report writes that the investigation "identified numerous links between the Russian government and the Trump campaign", found that Russia "perceived it would benefit from a Trump presidency" and that the 2016 Trump presidential campaign "expected it would benefit electorally" from Russian hacking efforts. Ultimately, "the investigation did not establish that members of the Trump campaign conspired or coordinated with the Russian government in its election interference activities".

However, investigators had an incomplete picture of what had really occurred during the 2016 campaign, due to some associates of Trump campaign providing either false, incomplete or declined testimony, as well as having deleted, unsaved or encrypted communications. As such, the Mueller report "cannot rule out the possibility" that information then unavailable to investigators would have presented different findings. In March 2020, the US Justice Department dropped its prosecution of two Russian firms linked to interference in the 2016 election.

==== Other countries ====
Special Council Robert Mueller also investigated the Trump campaign's alleged ties to Saudi Arabia, the United Arab Emirates, Turkey, Qatar, Israel, and China. According to The Times of Israel, Trump's longtime confidant Roger Stone "was in contact with one or more apparently well-connected Israelis at the height of the 2016 US presidential campaign, one of whom warned Stone that Trump was 'going to be defeated unless we intervene' and promised 'we have critical intell [sic].'"

The Justice Department accused George Nader of providing $3.5 million in illicit campaign donations to Hillary Clinton before the elections and to Trump after he won the elections. According to The New York Times, this was an attempt by the government of United Arab Emirates to influence the election.

In December 2018, a Ukrainian court ruled that prosecutors in Ukraine had meddled in the 2016 election by releasing damaging information on Trump campaign chairman Paul Manafort.

Voice of America reported in April 2020 that "U.S. intelligence agencies concluded the Chinese hackers meddled in both the 2016 and 2018 elections".

In July 2021, the US federal prosecutors accused Trump's former adviser Tom Barrack for being an unregistered foreign lobbying agent for the United Arab Emirates during the 2016 presidential campaign of Donald Trump. In 2022, Barrack was found not guilty on all charges.

== See also ==
- 1948 United States presidential election – Another upset in the history of United States presidential elections
- 2016 United States gubernatorial elections
- 2016 United States House of Representatives elections – House elections for the 115th U.S. Congress
- 2016 United States Senate elections
- History of the United States (2016–present)
- First inauguration of Donald Trump – 58th United States presidential inauguration
- White backlash – Political theory
