= United States Elections Project =

American political science website

- Website type: Voting statistics
- Available in: English
- Country of origin: US
- Founder: Michael P. McDonald
- Website: election.lab.ufl.edu www.electproject.org

The United States Elections Project is a website created and maintained by University of Florida political science professor Michael P. McDonald. It tracks voter turnout for US elections, including early voting. The New York Times reporter Lisa Lerer called it a "must-bookmark stop for everyone who obsesses about politics". Its data aggregations have been reported in many news sites, including The New York Times, Time, Axios, and USA Today, among others. Data from the project has also been used to create the redistricting simulator DistrictBuilder, an open source online web app that was created by the Public Mapping Project, which Dr. McDonald founded alongside Dr. Micah Altman.

Early elections data is obtained through data scraping of individual state websites, or through scraping the websites of individual counties within a state. The early voting statistics database is hosted on GitHub. In 2016, it was funded in part by a grant from the Hewlett Foundation.
