= Michael P. McDonald =

American political scientist

- Born: 1967 (age 58–59)
- Known for: United States Elections Project

Academic background
- Education: BS, Economics, California Institute of Technology; PhD, University of California, San Diego
- Thesis: Communicative Processes in Cultural Identity Formation: A Mediated Action Account

Academic work
- Institutions: University of Florida; George Mason University; University of Illinois Springfield; Vanderbilt University
- Website: electproject.org

Michael P. McDonald (born 1967) is an American political scientist. He is a Professor of Political Science at the University of Florida where he focuses on the United States elections.

== Early life and education ==
McDonald earned his Bachelor of Science degree in economics from the California Institute of Technology and his PhD from the University of California, San Diego.

== Career ==
Upon completing his postdoctoral fellowship at the Harvard-MIT Data Center, McDonald accepted an assistant professor position at Vanderbilt University in 1999. He stayed there for one year before transferring to the University of Illinois Springfield's department of political science.

In 2004, McDonald, Jeff Gill, and Micah Altman co-authored Numerical Issues in Statistical Computing for the Social Scientist, a book in the field of computational statistics which demonstrated that the reproducibility of statistical analyses used in social science are threatened by errors and limitations in the statistical computations and software used to estimate them. Based on this analysis, Altman, McDonald and Gill developed methods to detect issues in social science statistical models and provide more replicable and reliable estimates. McDonald continued to collaborate with Altman throughout his career and in 2011, they founded the Public Mapping Project, which developed DistrictBuilder, an open-source software redistricting application designed to provide online mapping tools. It received one of Politico's Best Policy Innovation Award for 2011, the 2012 Data Used for Social Impact award, and the Brown Democracy Medal from Pennsylvania State University. He is the director of the United States Election Project, which documents voter turnout statistics in US elections.

== Selected publications ==
The following is a list of selected publications

- The myth of the vanishing voter (2001)
- Numerical Issues in Statistical Computing for the Social Scientist (2004)
- The Marketplace of Democracy: Electoral Competition and American Politics (2006)
