= Results of the 2016 Republican Party presidential primaries =

2016 Republican Party presidential primaries
← 2012	February 1 to June 7, 2016	2020 →

2,472 delegates to the Republican National Convention 1,237 delegate votes needed to win

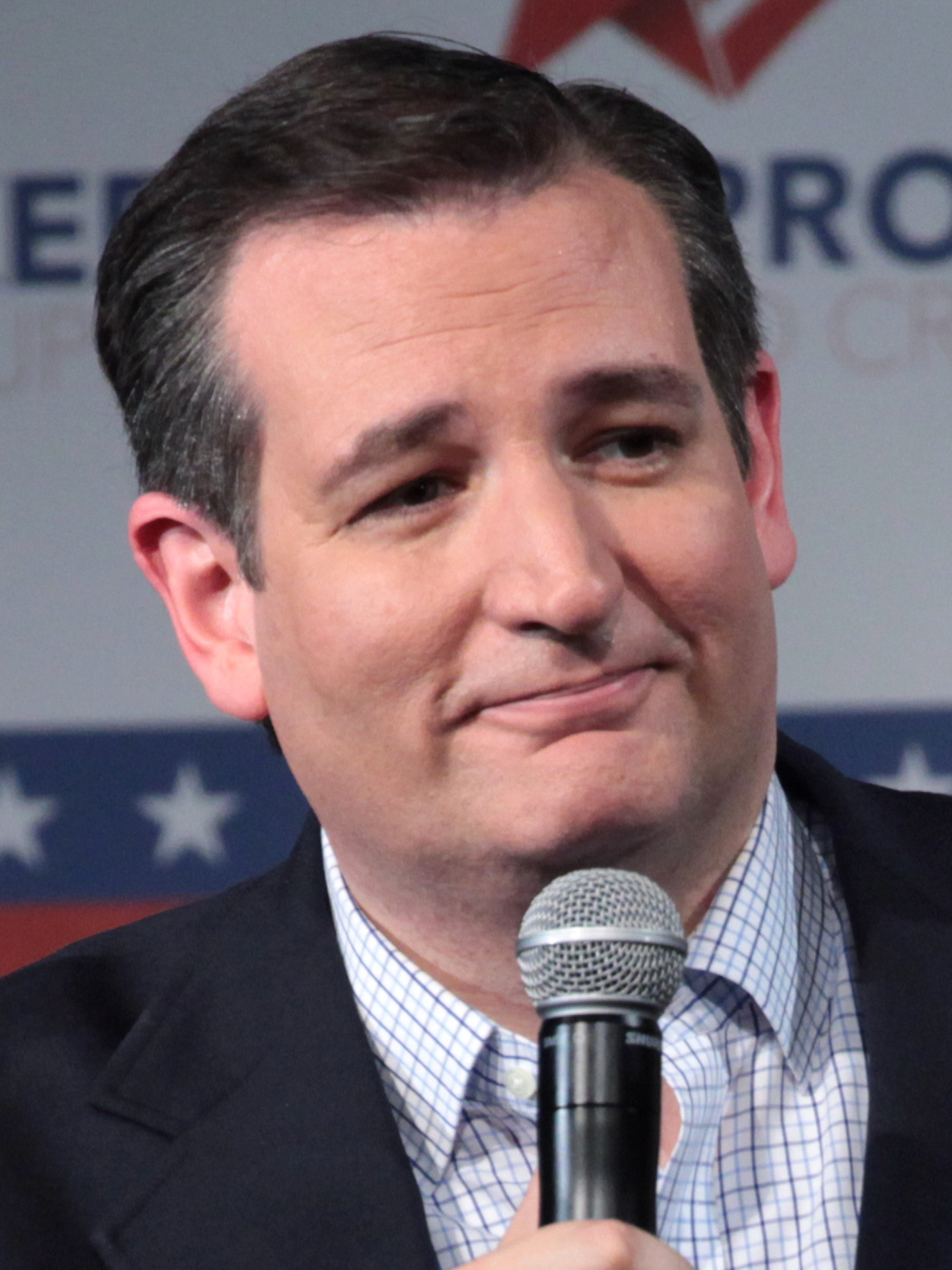

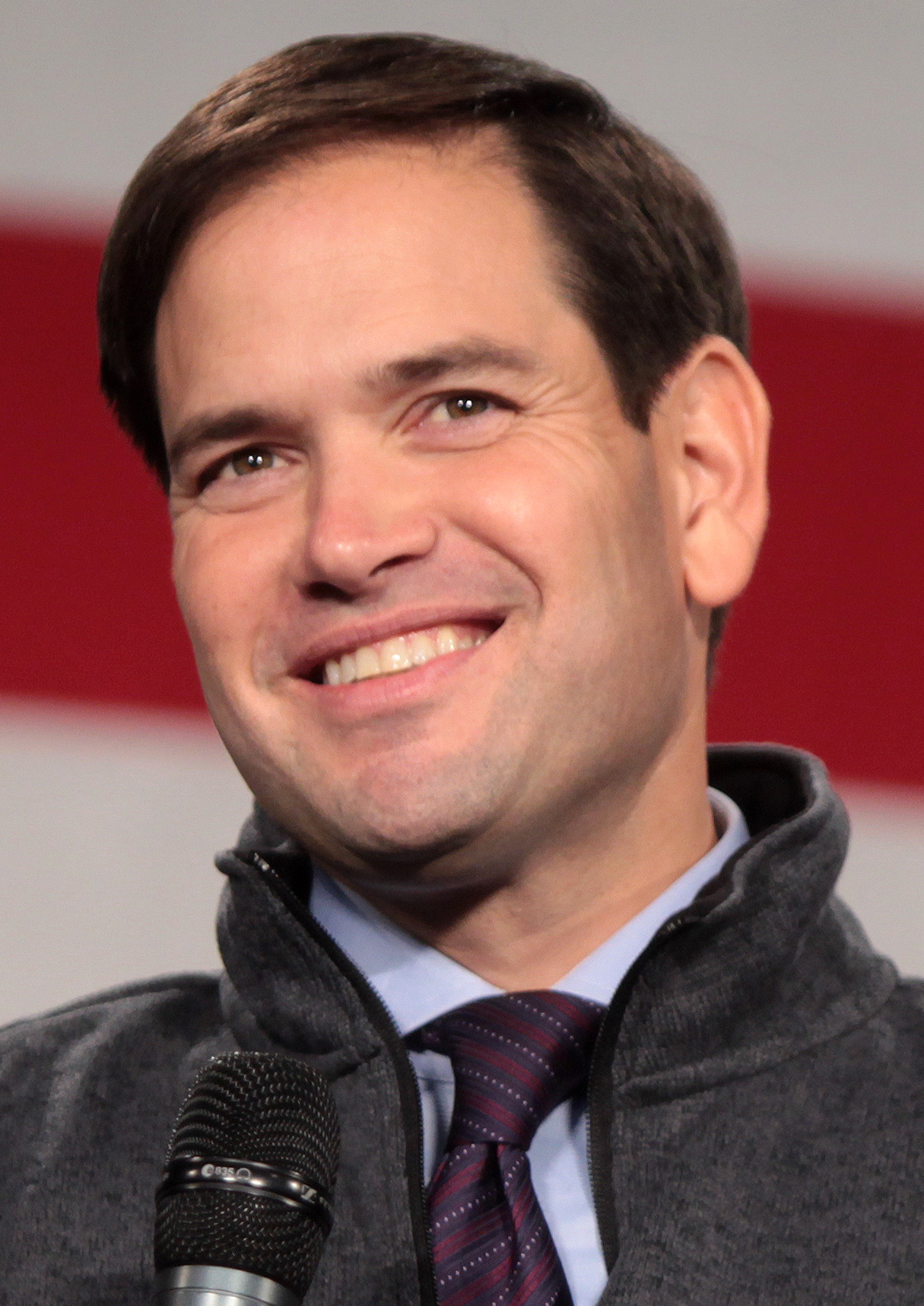

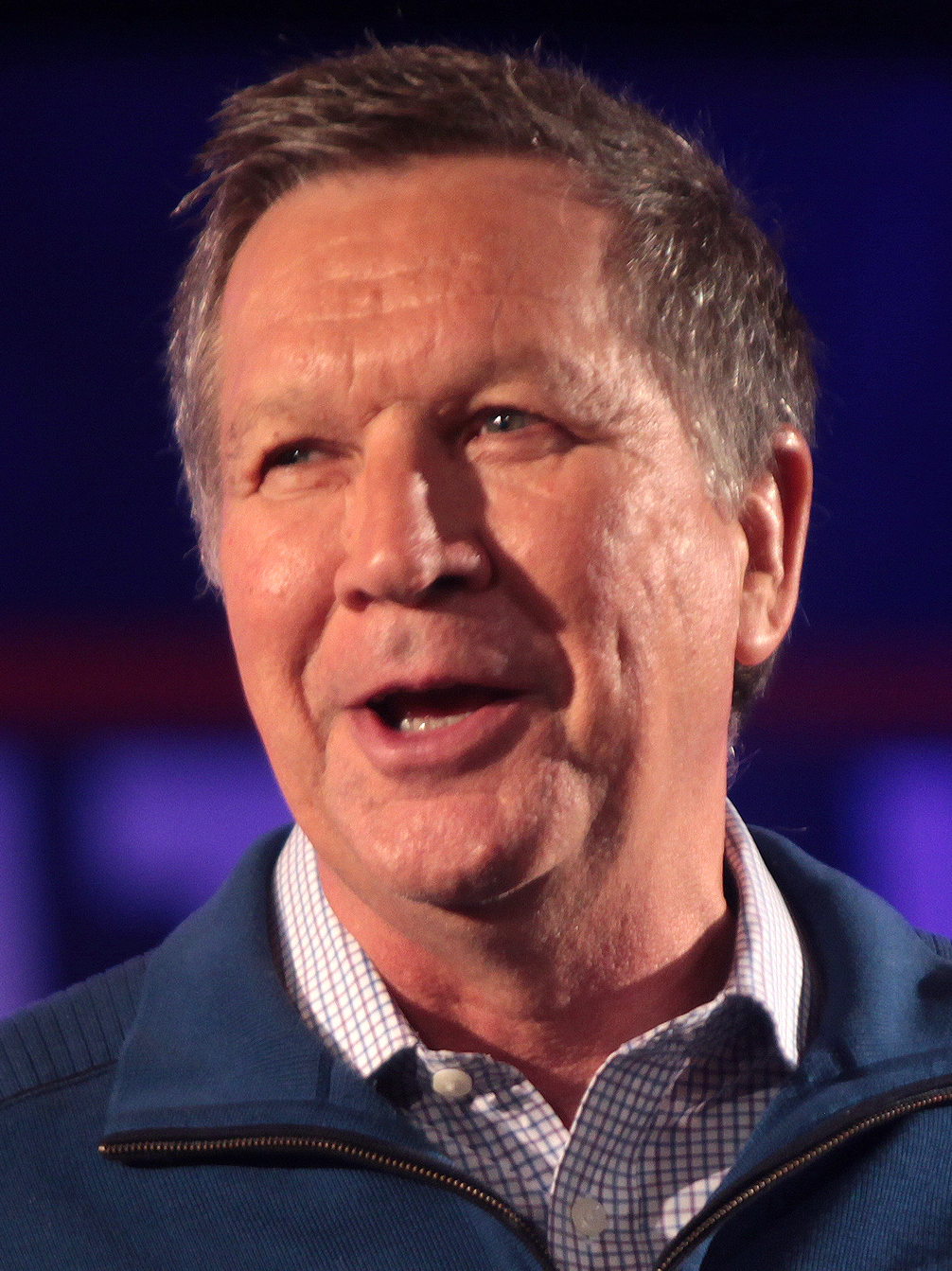
Candidate	Donald Trump	Ted Cruz
Home state	New York	Texas
Delegate count	1,441	551
Contests won	41	11
Popular vote	14,015,993	7,822,100
Percentage	44.9%	25.1%
Candidate	Marco Rubio	John Kasich
Home state	Florida	Ohio
Delegate count	173	161
Contests won	3	1
Popular vote	3,515,576	4,290,448
Percentage	11.3%	13.8%

Donald Trump
Ted Cruz
Uncommitted
Marco Rubio
John Kasich
Tie
Previous Republican nominee
Mitt Romney
Republican nominee
Donald Trump

This article contains the results of the 2016 Republican presidential primaries and caucuses, the processes by which the Republican Party selected delegates to attend the 2016 Republican National Convention from July 18–21. The series of primaries, caucuses, and state conventions culminated in the national convention, where the delegates cast their votes to formally select a candidate. A simple majority (1,237) of the total delegate votes (2,472) was required to become the party's nominee and was achieved by the nominee, businessman Donald Trump of New York.

The process began on March 23, 2015, when Texas Senator Ted Cruz became the first presidential candidate to announce his intentions to seek the office of United States President. That summer, 17 major candidates were recognized by national and state polls, making it the largest presidential candidate field for any single political party in American history. The large field made possible the fact that the 2016 primaries were the first since 1968 (and the first in which every state held a contest) in which more than three candidates won at least one state.

When voting began in the 2016 Iowa caucuses, twelve major candidates were actively campaigning; these were (ordered by date of withdrawal from the race) former Governor Mike Huckabee of Arkansas, former Senator Rick Santorum of Pennsylvania, Senator Rand Paul of Kentucky, Governor Chris Christie of New Jersey, businesswoman and former Hewlett-Packard Chief Executive Officer Carly Fiorina, former Governor Jim Gilmore of Virginia, Governor Jeb Bush of Florida, former neurosurgeon and Johns Hopkins University Director of Pediatric Neurosurgery Ben Carson, Senator Marco Rubio of Florida, Senator Ted Cruz of Texas, Governor John Kasich of Ohio, and the eventual nominee, businessman and Trump Organization CEO Donald Trump.

Following poor results from the first-in-the-nation caucus, Huckabee was the first candidate to drop out. Santorum also ended his campaign after a poor performance in Iowa. Paul withdrew from the race after placing fifth in Iowa, and subsequently polling poorly leading into the New Hampshire primary. Christie, who put nearly all of his campaign's resources into the critical state of New Hampshire, withdrew on February 10, 2016, after finishing sixth in the state. Following Christie's announcement, Fiorina suspended her campaign, which was unable to gain traction. Gilmore, who severely lacked funding, campaign infrastructure, and support, surprised many political pundits by staying in the race as far as he did; he dropped out shortly after the New Hampshire primary. Bush withdrew from actively campaigning after finishing fourth in the South Carolina primary. After Super Tuesday, Carson announced that there would be "no path forward" for his bid for the Presidency, effectively suspending his campaign. On March 15, 2016, Rubio dropped out after losing his home state, leaving three active candidates (Cruz, Kasich, and Trump). Trump's resounding victory in the Indiana primary on May 3, 2016, prompted Cruz's exit from the race. The following day, Trump became the presumptive Republican nominee after Kasich dropped out. Trump was formally nominated by the delegates of the 2016 Republican National Convention on July 19, 2016, and proceeded to defeat Democratic nominee Hillary Clinton in the general election on November 8, 2016, to become the 45th President of the United States.

== Major candidates ==
Dates	Contest	Donald Trump	John Kasich	Ted Cruz	Marco Rubio	Ben Carson	Jeb Bush	Jim Gilmore	Chris Christie	Carly Fiorina	Rand Paul	Mike Huckabee	Rick Santorum	Total delegates, pledged (unpledged/total), and votes
	Pledged delegates 95.11% (unpledged / soft total) (Total: 2,472 Available 0)	1,457 (80 / 1,537); 58.94% pledged	160 (3 / 163); 6.51% pledged	553 (16 / 569); 22.37% pledged	166 (0 / 166); 6.72% pledged	7 (0 / 7); 0.28% pledged	4 (0 / 4); 0.16% pledged	0 (0 / 0); 0.00% pledged	0 (0 / 0); 0.0% pledged	1 (0 / 1); 0.04% pledged	2 (0 / 2); 0.04% pledged	1 (0 / 1); 0.04% pledged	0 (0 / 0); 0.00% pledged	2,363 (109 / 2,472) 31,183,841 votes
	Popular votes^{a} Total: 31,183,841	14,015,993 (44.95%)	4,290,448 (13.76%)	7,822,100 (25.08%)	3,515,576 (11.27%)	857,039 (2.75%)	286,694 (0.92%)	18,369 (0.06%)	57,637 (0.18%)	40,666 (0.13%)	66,788 (0.21%)	51,450 (0.16%)	16,627 (0.05%)	2,363 (109 / 2,472) 31,183,841 votes
Feb 1, 2016	Iowa; Binding precinct caucuses	24% (7 delegates) (45,429 votes)	2% (1 delegate) (3,474 votes)	28% (8 delegates) (51,666 votes)	23% (7 delegates) (43,228 votes)	9% (3 delegates) (17,394 votes)	3% (1 delegate) (5,238 votes)	0% (0 delegates) (12 votes)	2% (0 delegates) (3,284 votes)	2% (1 delegate) (3,485 votes)	5% (1 delegate) (8,481 votes)	2% (1 delegate) (3,345 votes)	1% (0 delegates) (1,779 votes)	30 (0/30) (186,932 votes)
Feb 9, 2016	New Hampshire; Binding primary	35% (11 delegates) (100,735 votes)	16% (4 delegates) (44,932 votes)	12% (3 delegates) (33,244 votes)	11% (2 delegates) (30,071 votes)	2% (0 delegates) (6,527 votes)	11% (3 delegates) (31,341 votes)	0% (0 delegates) (134 votes)	7% (0 delegates) (21,089 votes)	4% (0 delegates) (11,774 votes)	1% (0 delegates) (1,930 votes)	0% (0 delegates) (216 votes)	0% (0 delegates) (160 votes)	23 (0/23) (285,916 votes)
Feb 20, 2016	South Carolina; Binding primary	33% (50 delegates) (240,882 votes)	8% (0 delegates) (56,410 votes)	22% (0 delegates) (165,417 votes)	22% (0 delegates) (166,565 votes)	7% (0 delegates) (53,551 votes)	8% (0 delegates) (58,056 votes)	-	-	-	-	-	-	50 (0/50) (740,881 votes)
Feb 23, 2016	Nevada; Binding precinct caucuses	46% (14 delegates) (34,531 votes)	4% (1 delegate) (2,709 votes)	21% (6 delegates) (16,079 votes)	24% (7 delegates) (17,940 votes)	5% (2 delegates) (3,619 votes)	0% (0 delegates) (64 votes)	0% (0 delegates) (0 votes)	0% (0 delegates) (50 votes)	0% (0 delegates) (22 votes)	0% (0 delegates) (170 votes)	0% (0 delegates) (21 votes)	0% (0 delegates) (11 votes)	30 (0/30) (75,482 votes)
Mar 1, 2016	Alabama; Binding primary	43% (36 delegates) (373,721 votes)	4% (0 delegates) (38,119 votes)	21% (13 delegates) (181,479 votes)	19% (1 delegate) (160,606 votes)	10% (0 delegates) (88,094 votes)	0% (0 delegates) (3,974 votes)		0% (0 delegates) (858 votes)	0% (0 delegates) (544 votes)	0% (0 delegates) (1,895 votes)	0% (0 delegates) (2,539 votes)	0% (0 delegates) (617 votes)	50 (0/50) (860,652 votes)
Mar 1, 2016	Alaska; Binding legislative district conventions	34% (11 delegates) (7,740 votes)	4% (0 delegates) (918 votes)	36% (12 delegates) (8,369 votes)	15% (5 delegates) (3,488 votes)	11% (0 delegates) (2,492 votes)								28 (0/28) (23,010 votes)
Mar 1, 2016	Arkansas; Binding primary	33% (16 delegates) (134,744 votes)	4% (0 delegates) (15,305 votes)	31% (15 delegates) (125,340 votes)	25% (9 delegates) (101,910 votes)	6% (0 delegates) (23,521 votes)	0% (0 delegates) (2,402 votes)		0% (0 delegates) (631 votes)	0% (0 delegates) (411 votes)	0% (0 delegates) (1,151 votes)	1% (0 delegates) (4,792 votes)	0% (0 delegates) (292 votes)	40 (0/40) (410,920 votes)
Mar 1, 2016	Georgia; Binding primary	39% (42 delegates) (502,994 votes)	6% (0 delegates) (72,508 votes)	24% (18 delegates) (305,847 votes)	24% (16 delegates) (316,836 votes)	6% (0 delegates) (80,723 votes)	1% (0 delegates) (7,686 votes)		0% (0 delegates) (1,486 votes)	0% (0 delegates) (1,146 votes)	0% (0 delegates) (2,910 votes)	0% (0 delegates) (2,625 votes)	0% (0 delegates) (539 votes)	76 (0/76) (1,295,964 votes)
Mar 1, 2016	Massachusetts; Binding primary	49% (22 delegates) (312,425 votes)	18% (8 delegates) (114,434 votes)	10% (4 delegates) (60,592 votes)	18% (8 delegates) (113,170 votes)	3% (0 delegates) (16,360 votes)	1% (0 delegates) (6,559 votes)	0% (0 delegates) (753 votes)	0% (0 delegates) (1,906 votes)	0% (0 delegates) (1,153 votes)	0% (0 delegates) (1,864 votes)	0% (0 delegates) (709 votes)	0% (0 delegates) (293 votes)	42 (0/42) (637,703 votes)
Mar 1, 2016	Minnesota; Binding precinct caucuses	21% (8 delegates) (24,473 votes)	6% (0 delegates) (6,565 votes)	29% (13 delegates) (33,181 votes)	36% (17 delegates) (41,397 votes)	7% (0 delegates) (8,422 votes)	0% (0 delegates) (0 votes)							38 (0/38) (114,245 votes)
Mar 1, 2016	Oklahoma; Binding primary	28% (14 delegates) (130,267 votes)	4% (0 delegates) (16,524 votes)	34% (15 delegates) (158,078 votes)	26% (12 delegates) (119,633 votes)	6% (0 delegates) (28,601 votes)	0% (0 delegates) (2,091 votes)		0% (0 delegates) (545 votes)	0% (0 delegates) (610 votes)	0% (0 delegates) (1,666 votes)	0% (0 delegates) (1,308 votes)	0% (0 delegates) (375 votes)	40 (3/43) (459,922 votes)
Mar 1, 2016	Tennessee; Binding primary	39% (33 delegates) (333,180 votes)	5% (0 delegates) (45,301 votes)	25% (16 delegates) (211,471 votes)	21% (9 delegates) (181,274 votes)	8% (0 delegates) (64,951 votes)	1% (0 delegates) (9,551 votes)	0% (0 delegates) (267 votes)	0% (0 delegates) (1,256 votes)	0% (0 delegates) (715 votes)	0% (0 delegates) (2,350 votes)	0% (0 delegates) (2,415 votes)	0% (0 delegates) (710 votes)	58 (0/58) (855,729 votes)
Mar 1, 2016	Texas; Binding primary	27% (48 delegates) (758,762 votes)	4% (0 delegates) (120,473 votes)	44% (104 delegates) (1,241,118 votes)	18% (3 delegates) (503,055 votes)	4% (0 delegates) (117,969 votes)	1% (0 delegates) (35,420 votes)		0% (0 delegates) (3,448 votes)	0% (0 delegates) (3,247 votes)	0% (0 delegates) (8,000 votes)	0% (0 delegates) (6,226 votes)	0% (0 delegates) (2,006 votes)	155 (0/155) (2,836,488 votes)
Mar 1, 2016	Vermont; Binding primary	32% (8 delegates) (19,974 votes)	30% (8 delegates) (18,534 votes)	10% (0 delegates) (5,932 votes)	19% (0 delegates) (11,781 votes)	4% (0 delegates) (2,551 votes)	2% (0 delegates) (1,106 votes)		1% (0 delegates) (361 votes)	0% (0 delegates) (212 votes)	1% (0 delegates) (423 votes)		0% (0 delegates) (164 votes)	16 (0/16) (61,756 votes)
Mar 1, 2016	Virginia; Binding primary	35% (17 delegates) (356,840 votes)	10% (5 delegates) (97,784 votes)	17% (8 delegates) (171,150 votes)	32% (16 delegates) (327,918 votes)	6% (3 delegates) (60,228 votes)	0% (0 delegates) (3,645 votes)	0% (0 delegates) (653 votes)	0% (0 delegates) (1,102 votes)	0% (0 delegates) (914 votes)	0% (0 delegates) (2,917 votes)	0% (0 delegates) (1,458 votes)	0% (0 delegates) (399 votes)	49 (0/49) (1,025,452 votes)
Mar 5, 2016	Kansas; Binding precinct caucuses	23% (9 delegates) (18,443 votes)	11% (1 delegate) (8,741 votes)	47% (24 delegates) (37,512 votes)	17% (6 delegates) (13,295 votes)	1% (0 delegates) (582 votes)	0% (0 delegates) (84 votes)		0% (0 delegates) (0 votes)	0% (0 delegates) (42 votes)	0% (0 delegates) (0 votes)	0% (0 delegates) (0 votes)	0% (0 delegates) (0 votes)	40 (0/40) (78,978 votes)
Mar 5, 2016	Kentucky; Binding Caucuses	36% (17 delegates) (82,493 votes)	14% (7 delegates) (33,134 votes)	32% (15 delegates) (72,503 votes)	16% (7 delegates) (37,579 votes)	1% (0 delegates) (1,951 votes)	0% (0 delegates) (305 votes)		0% (0 delegates) (64 votes)	0% (0 delegates) (65 votes)	0% (0 delegates) (872 votes)	0% (0 delegates) (174 votes)	0% (0 delegates) (31 votes)	46 (0/46) (229,667 votes)
Mar 5, 2016	Louisiana; Binding primary	41% (25 delegates) (124,854 votes)	6% (0 delegates) (19,359 votes)	38% (18 delegates) (113,968 votes)	11% (0 delegates) (33,813 votes)	2% (0 delegates) (4,544 votes)	1% (0 delegates) (2,145 votes)		0% (0 delegates) (401 votes)	0% (0 delegates) (243 votes)	0% (0 delegates) (670 votes)	0% (0 delegates) (645 votes)	0% (0 delegates) (180 votes)	43 (3/46) (301,241 votes)
Mar 5, 2016	Maine; Binding Municipal Caucuses	33% (9 delegates) (6,070 votes)	12% (2 delegates) (2,270 votes)	46% (12 delegates) (8,550 votes)	8% (0 delegates) (1,492 votes)	0% (0 delegates) (132 votes)	0% (0 delegates) (31 votes)		0% (0 delegates) (0 votes)	0% (0 delegates) (17 votes)	0% (0 delegates) (55 votes)	0% (0 delegates) (10 votes)		23 (0/23) (18,627 votes)
Mar 6, 2016	Puerto Rico; Binding primary	13% (0 delegates) (5,474 votes)	1% (0 delegates) (582 votes)	9% (0 delegates) (3,610 votes)	70% (23 delegates) (28,937 votes)	0% (0 delegates) (168 votes)	1% (0 delegates) (296 votes)	0% (0 delegates) (30 votes)	0% (0 delegates) (23 votes)	1% (0 delegates) (375 votes)	0% (0 delegates) (48 votes)	0% (0 delegates) (77 votes)	0% (0 delegates) (36 votes)	23 (0/23) (41,196 votes)
Mar 8, 2016	Hawaii; Binding precinct caucuses	43% (11 delegates) (6,805 votes)	10% (0 delegates) (1,566 votes)	32% (7 delegates) (5,063 votes)	13% (1 delegate) (2,068 votes)	1% (0 delegates) (146 votes)	0% (0 delegates) (24 votes)							19 (0/19) (15,708 votes)
Mar 8, 2016	Idaho; Binding primary	28% (12 delegates) (62,413 votes)	7% (0 delegates) (16,514 votes)	45% (20 delegates) (100,889 votes)	16% (0 delegates) (35,290 votes)	2% (0 delegates) (3,853 votes)	0% (0 delegates) (939 votes)		0% (0 delegates) (353 votes)	0% (0 delegates) (242 votes)	0% (0 delegates) (834 votes)	0% (0 delegates) (358 votes)	0% (0 delegates) (211 votes)	32 (0/32) (222,004 votes)
Mar 8, 2016	Michigan; Binding primary	37% (25 delegates) (483,753 votes)	24% (17 delegates) (321,115 votes)	25% (17 delegates) (326,617 votes)	9% (0 delegates) (123,587 votes)	2% (0 delegates) (21,349 votes)	1% (0 delegates) (10,685 votes)		0% (0 delegates) (3,116 votes)	0% (0 delegates) (1,415 votes)	0% (0 delegates) (3,774 votes)	0% (0 delegates) (2,603 votes)	0% (0 delegates) (1,722 votes)	59 (0/59) (1,323,589 votes)
Mar 8, 2016	Mississippi; Binding primary	47% (25 delegates) (196,659 votes)	9% (0 delegates) (36,795 votes)	36% (15 delegates) (150,364 votes)	5% (0 delegates) (21,885 votes)	1% (0 delegates) (5,626 votes)	0% (0 delegates) (1,697 votes)		0% (0 delegates) (493 votes)	0% (0 delegates) (224 votes)	0% (0 delegates) (643 votes)	0% (0 delegates) (1,067 votes)	0% (0 delegates) (510 votes)	40 (0/40) (416,270 votes)
Mar 10, 2016	US Virgin Islands; Territorial caucus^{b}	6% (9 delegates) (104 votes)		12% (0 delegates) (191 votes)	10% (0 delegates) (161 votes)	7% (0 delegates) (108 votes)								6 (3/9) (1,627 votes)
Mar 12, 2016	District of Columbia; Convention	14% (0 delegates) (391 votes)	36% (9 delegates) (1,009 votes)	12% (0 delegates) (351 votes)	37% (10 delegates) (1,059 votes)	0% (0 delegates) (3 votes)	0% (0 delegates) (14 votes)		0% (0 delegates) (0 votes)	0% (0 delegates) (0 votes)	0% (0 delegates) (12 votes)		0% (0 delegates) (0 votes)	19 (0/19) (2,839 votes)
Mar 12, 2016	Guam; Territorial caucuses^{c}	(9 delegates)		(0 delegates)										0 (9/9)
Mar 12, 2016	Wyoming; Binding County conventions^{d}	7% (1 delegate) (112 votes)	3% (0 delegates) (42 votes)	71% (9 delegates) (1128 votes)	15% (1 delegate) (231 votes)									11 (1/12) (1,590 votes)
Mar 15, 2016	Florida; Binding primary	46% (99 delegates) (1,079,870 votes)	7% (0 delegates) (159,976 votes)	17% (0 delegates) (404,891 votes)	27% (0 delegates) (638,661 votes)	1% (0 delegates) (21,207 votes)	2% (0 delegates) (43,511 votes)	0% (0 delegates) (319 votes)	0% (0 delegates) (2,493 votes)	0% (0 delegates) (1,899 votes)	0% (0 delegates) (4,450 votes)	0% (0 delegates) (2,624 votes)	0% (0 delegates) (1,211 votes)	99 (0/99) (2,361,805 votes)
Mar 15, 2016	Illinois; Binding primary	39% (54 delegates) (562,464 votes)	20% (6 delegates) (286,118 votes)	30% (9 delegates) (438,235 votes)	9% (0 delegates) (126,681 votes)	1% (0 delegates) (11,469 votes)	1% (0 delegates) (11,188 votes)	0% (0 delegates) (0 votes)	0% (0 delegates) (3,428 votes)	0% (0 delegates) (1,540 votes)	0% (0 delegates) (4,718 votes)	0% (0 delegates) (2,737 votes)	0% (0 delegates) (1,154 votes)	69 (0/69) (1,449,748 votes)
Mar 15, 2016	Missouri; Binding primary	41% (37 delegates) (383,631 votes)	10% (0 delegates) (94,857 votes)	41% (15 delegates) (381,666 votes)	6% (0 delegates) (57,244 votes)	1% (0 delegates) (8,233 votes)	0% (0 delegates) (3,361 votes)		0% (0 delegates) (1,681 votes)	0% (0 delegates) (615 votes)	0% (0 delegates) (1,777 votes)	0% (0 delegates) (2,148 votes)	0% (0 delegates) (732 votes)	52 (0/52) (939,270 votes)
Mar 15, 2016	North Carolina; Binding primary	40% (29 delegates) (462,413 votes)	13% (9 delegates) (145,659 votes)	37% (27 delegates) (422,621 votes)	8% (6 delegates) (88,907 votes)	1% (1 delegate) (11,019 votes)	0% (0 delegates) (3,893 votes)	0% (0 delegates) (265 votes)	0% (0 delegates) (1,256 votes)	0% (0 delegates) (929 votes)	0% (0 delegates) (2,753 votes)	0% (0 delegates) (3,071 votes)	0% (0 delegates) (663 votes)	72 (0/72) (1,149,530 votes)
Mar 15, 2016	Northern Mariana Islands; Binding primary	73% (9 delegates) (343 votes)	2% (0 delegates) (10 votes)	24% (0 delegates) (113 votes)	1% (0 delegates) (5 votes)	0% (0 delegates) (0 votes)								9 (0/9) (471 votes)
Mar 15, 2016	Ohio; Binding primary	36% (0 delegates) (713,404 votes)	47% (66 delegates) (933,886 votes)	13% (0 delegates) (264,640 votes)	2% (0 delegates) (46,478 votes)	1% (0 delegates) (14,351 votes)	0% (0 delegates) (5,398 votes)	0% (0 delegates) (0 votes)	0% (0 delegates) (2,430 votes)	0% (0 delegates) (2,112 votes)	0% (0 delegates) (0 votes)	0% (0 delegates) (4,941 votes)	0% (0 delegates) (1,320 votes)	66 (0/66) (1,988,960 votes)
Mar 22, 2016	American Samoa; Territorial caucus^{e}	(9 delegates)		(0 delegates)										0 (9/9)
Mar 22, 2016	Arizona; Binding primary	46% (58 delegates) (286,743 votes)	11% (0 delegates) (65,965 votes)	28% (0 delegates) (172,294 votes)	12% (0 delegates) (72,304 votes)	2% (0 delegates) (14,940 votes)	1% (0 delegates) (4,393 votes)		0% (0 delegates) (988 votes)	0% (0 delegates) (1,270 votes)	0% (0 delegates) (2,260 votes)	0% (0 delegates) (1,300 votes)	0% (0 delegates) (523 votes)	58 (0/58) (624,039 votes)
Mar 22, 2016	Utah; Binding precinct caucuses	14% (0 delegates) (26,434 votes)	17% (0 delegates) (31,992 votes)	69% (40 delegates) (132,904 votes)										40 (0/40) (191,330 votes)
Apr 1, 2016	North Dakota; State convention^{f} (Apr 1-3)	(17 delegates)		(11 delegates)										0 (28/28)
Apr 5, 2016	Wisconsin; Binding primary	35% (6 delegates) (387,295 votes)	14% (0 delegates) (155,902 votes)	48% (36 delegates) (533,079 votes)	1% (0 delegates) (10,591 votes)	1% (0 delegates) (5,660 votes)	0% (0 delegates) (3,054 votes)	0% (0 delegates) (245 votes)	0% (0 delegates) (1,191 votes)	0% (0 delegates) (772 votes)	0% (0 delegates) (2,519 votes)	0% (0 delegates) (1,424 votes)	0% (0 delegates) (511 votes)	42 (0/42) (1,105,944 votes)
Apr 2, 2016	Colorado; District and state conventions (Apr 2, 7-9)	(1 delegate)		(33 delegates)										34 (3/37)
Apr 14, 2016	Wyoming; State convention (Apr 14–16)			(15 delegates)										14 (3/17) (0 votes)
Apr 19, 2016	New York; Binding primary	59% (89 delegates) (554,522 votes)	25% (6 delegates) (231,166 votes)	15% (0 delegates) (136,083 votes)	-	-	-							95 (0/95) (936,527 votes)
Apr 26, 2016	Connecticut; Binding primary	58% (28 delegates) (123,523 votes)	28% (0 delegates) (60,522 votes)	12% (0 delegates) (24,987 votes)		1% (0 delegates) (1,733 votes)								28 (0/28) (213,493 votes)
Apr 26, 2016	Delaware; Binding primary	61% (16 delegates) (42,472 votes)	20% (0 delegates) (14,225 votes)	16% (0 delegates) (11,110 votes)	1% (0 delegates) (622 votes)	1% (0 delegates) (885 votes)	1% (0 delegates) (578 votes)							16 (0/16) (69,892 votes)
Apr 26, 2016	Maryland; Binding primary	54% (38 delegates) (248,343 votes)	23% (0 delegates) (106,614 votes)	19% (0 delegates) (87,093 votes)	1% (0 delegates) (3,201 votes)	1% (0 delegates) (5,946 votes)	1% (0 delegates) (2,770 votes)		0% (0 delegates) (1,239 votes)	0% (0 delegates) (1,012 votes)	0% (0 delegates) (1,533 votes)	0% (0 delegates) (837 votes)	0% (0 delegates) (478 votes)	38 (0/38) (459,066 votes)
Apr 26, 2016	Pennsylvania; Binding primary	57% (59 delegates) (902,593 votes)	19% (3 delegates) (310,003 votes)	22% (4 delegates) (345,506 votes)	1% (0 delegates) (11,954 votes)	1% (0 delegates) (14,842 votes)	1% (0 delegates) (9,577 votes)							17 (54/71) (1,594,475 votes)
Apr 26, 2016	Rhode Island; Binding primary	63% (12 delegates) (39,221 votes)	24% (5 delegates) (14,963 votes)	10% (2 delegates) (6,416 votes)	1% (0 delegates) (382 votes)									19 (0/19) (62,331 votes)
May 3, 2016	Indiana; Binding primary	53% (57 delegates) (591,514 votes)	8% (0 delegates) (84,111 votes)	37% (0 delegates) (406,783 votes)	0% (0 delegates) (5,175 votes)	1% (0 delegates) (8,914 votes)	1% (0 delegates) (6,508 votes)		0% (0 delegates) (1,738 votes)	0% (0 delegates) (1,494 votes)	0% (0 delegates) (4,306 votes)			57 (0/57) (1,110,543 votes)
May 10, 2016	Nebraska; Binding primary	61% (36 delegates) (122,327 votes)	11% (0 delegates) (22,709 votes)	18% (0 delegates) (36,703 votes)	4% (0 delegates) (7,233 votes)	5% (0 delegates) (10,016 votes)								36 (0/36) (198,988 votes)
May 10, 2016	West Virginia; Binding primary	77% (32 delegates) (157,238 votes)	7% (1 delegate) (13,721 votes)	9% (0 delegates) (18,301 votes)	1% (0 delegates) (2,908 votes)	2% (0 delegates) (4,421 votes)	1% (0 delegates) (2,305 votes)		0% (0 delegates) (727 votes)	0% (0 delegates) (659 votes)	1% (0 delegates) (1,798 votes)	1% (0 delegates) (1,780 votes)		33 (1/34) (204,061 votes)
May 17, 2016	Oregon; Binding primary	64% (18 delegates) (252,748 votes)	16% (5 delegates) (62,248 votes)	17% (5 delegates) (65,513 votes)										28 (0/28) (393,920 votes)
May 24, 2016	Washington; Binding primary	75% (41 delegates) (455,023 votes)	10% (0 delegates) (58,954 votes)	11% (0 delegates) (65,172 votes)		4% (0 delegates) (23,849 votes)								41 (3/44) (602,998 votes)
Jun 7, 2016	California; Binding primary	75% (172 delegates) (1,665,135 votes)	11% (0 delegates) (252,544 votes)	9% (0 delegates) (211,576 votes)		4% (0 delegates) (82,259 votes)		1% (0 delegates) (15,691 votes)						172 (0/172) (2,227,306 votes)
Jun 7, 2016	Montana; Binding primary	74% (27 delegates) (115,594 votes)	7% (0 delegates) (10,777 votes)	9% (0 delegates) (14,682 votes)	3% (0 delegates) (5,192 votes)		2% (0 delegates) (3,274 votes)							27 (0/27) (156,888 votes)
Jun 7, 2016	New Jersey; Binding primary	80% (51 delegates) (360,212 votes)	13% (0 delegates) (59,866 votes)	6% (0 delegates) (27,874 votes)										51 (0/51) (447,952 votes)
Jun 7, 2016	New Mexico; Binding primary	71% (24 delegates) (73,908 votes)	8% (0 delegates) (7,925 votes)	13% (0 delegates) (13,925 votes)		4% (0 delegates) (3,830 votes)	3% (0 delegates) (3,531 votes)			1% (0 delegates) (1,508 votes)				24 (0/24) (104,627 votes)
Jun 7, 2016	South Dakota; Binding primary	67% (29 delegates) (44,867 votes)	16% (0 delegates) (10,660 votes)	17% (0 delegates) (11,352 votes)										29 (0/29) (66,879 votes)
Withdrawal date		Presumptive nominee	May 4, 2016	May 3, 2016	March 15, 2016	March 4, 2016	February 20, 2016	February 12, 2016	February 10, 2016	February 10, 2016	February 3, 2016	February 1, 2016	February 1, 2016	

Legend:	1st place (popular vote)	2nd place (popular vote)	3rd place (popular vote)	Candidate has withdrawn	Candidate unable to appear on ballot

Notes
^{a} Vote totals may include votes for minor candidates, "uncommitted", "no preference", "write-ins" or other options.
^{b} In the Virgin Islands, 65% of the vote (1,063 votes) went to uncommitted delegates.
^{c} In Guam, 8 out of 9 delegates initially went uncommitted, and 1 unpledged delegate initially went to Cruz. After all candidates but Trump withdrew, Trump garnered the support of all 9.
^{d} In Wyoming, 5% of the vote went to uncommitted delegates.
^{e} In American Samoa, all 9 delegates initially went uncommitted. After all candidates but Trump withdrew, Trump garnered the support of all 9.
^{f} In North Dakota, some delegates have committed to Cruz or Trump, but these delegates are unpledged.

=== Other candidates ===
Prior to the Iowa caucuses, five major candidates, who had been invited to the debates, had withdrawn from the race after states began to certify candidates for ballot spots: Rick Perry, Scott Walker, Bobby Jindal, Lindsey Graham, and George Pataki. Other candidates, nearly 15 in New Hampshire alone, were able to make it on the ballot in individual states. Some votes for minor candidates are unavailable, because in many states (territories) they can be listed as Others or Write-ins. Since the beginning of the primary season, none of these other candidates have been awarded any delegates.

Other/withdrawn candidates invited to debates
Candidate	Votes	Date withdrawn
Lindsey Graham	5,666	December 21, 2015
George Pataki	2,036	December 29, 2015
Bobby Jindal	222	November 17, 2015
Scott Walker		September 21, 2015
Rick Perry		September 11, 2015

Other candidates on the ballot (in New Hampshire unless otherwise noted)
Candidate	Votes	States on ballot
Elizabeth Gray	5,449	1 (Texas)
Timothy "Tim" Cook	517	3
David Eames Hall	203	1 (West Virginia)
Andy Martin	202	1
Richard P.H. Witz	104	1
James Lynch	100	1 (Missouri)
Peter Messina	81	3
Andrew Brooks Cullinson	56	1
Frank Lynch	47	1
Joe Robinson	44	1
Victor Williams	44	2 (California, Wisconsin)
David Thomson	35	1 (California)
Stephen Bradley Comley, Sr.	32	1
JoAnn Breivogel	31	2 (California, Illinois)
Chomi Prag	16	1
Jacob Daniel Dyas, Sr.	15	1
John Dowell	14	1 (California)
Stephen John McCarthy	12	1
Donald Gonzalez	10	1 (California)
Walter N. Iwachiw	9	1
Kevin Glenn Huey	8	1
James Alexander-Pace	7	1 (California)
Matt Drozd	6	1
Frederic Vidal	6	1 (California)
Robert Lawrence Mann	5	1
Troy Southern	4	1 (California)
James Ogle	3	1 (California)
James Germalio	2	1 (California)

== Results ==
Primary and caucuses can be binding or nonbinding in allocating delegates to the respective state delegations to the National convention. But the actual election of the delegates can be at a later date. Delegates are (1) elected at conventions, (2) from slates submitted by the candidates, (3) selected by the state chairman or (4) at committee meetings or (5) elected directly at the caucuses and primaries.
Until the delegates are actually elected the delegate numbers are by nature projections, but it is only in the nonbinding caucus states where they are not allocated at the primary or caucus date.

=== Early states ===
==== Iowa ====
Nonbinding caucus: February 1, 2016
State convention: June 2016
National delegates: 30

County results of the Iowa Republican presidential caucuses, 2016 Ted Cruz Donald Trump Marco Rubio Tie

Iowa Republican precinct caucuses, February 1, 2016
Candidate	Votes	Percentage	Actual delegate count		
Candidate	Votes	Percentage	Bound	Unbound	Total
Ted Cruz	51,666	27.64%	8	0	8
Donald Trump	45,427	24.3%	7	0	7
Marco Rubio	43,165	23.12%	7	0	7
Ben Carson	17,395	9.3%	3	0	3
Rand Paul	8,481	4.54%	1	0	1
Jeb Bush	5,238	2.8%	1	0	1
Carly Fiorina	3,485	1.86%	1	0	1
John Kasich	3,474	1.86%	1	0	1
Mike Huckabee	3,345	1.79%	1	0	1
Chris Christie	3,284	1.76%	0	0	0
Rick Santorum	1,783	0.95%	0	0	0
Other	117	0.06%	0	0	0
Jim Gilmore	12	0.01%	0	0	0
Unprojected delegates:			0	0	0
Total:	186,932	100.00%	30	0	30
Source: "Iowa". cnn.com.

==== New Hampshire ====
Primary date: February 9, 2016
National delegates: 23

County (left) and Municipal (right) results of the New Hampshire Republican primaries, 2016.
Donald Trump
John Kasich
Ted Cruz
Tie
Not reported (Note: The Associated Press did not report results from municipalities where there were five or fewer registered voters.)

New Hampshire Republican primary, February 9, 2016
Candidate	Votes	Percentage	Actual delegate count		
Candidate	Votes	Percentage	Bound	Unbound	Total
Donald Trump	100,735	35.23%	11	0	11
John Kasich	44,932	15.72%	4	0	4
Ted Cruz	33,244	11.63%	3	0	3
Jeb Bush	31,341	10.96%	3	0	3
Marco Rubio	30,071	10.52%	2	0	2
Chris Christie	21,089	7.38%	0	0	0
Carly Fiorina	11,774	4.12%	0	0	0
Ben Carson	6,527	2.28%	0	0	0
Rand Paul (withdrawn)	1,930	0.68%	0	0	0
Write-ins	2,912	1.02%	0	0	0
Mike Huckabee (withdrawn)	216	0.08%	0	0	0
Andy Martin	202	0.07%	0	0	0
Rick Santorum (withdrawn)	160	0.06%	0	0	0
Jim Gilmore	134	0.05%	0	0	0
Richard Witz	104	0.04%	0	0	0
George Pataki (withdrawn)	79	0.03%	0	0	0
Lindsey Graham (withdrawn)	73	0.03%	0	0	0
Brooks Andrews Cullison	56	0.02%	0	0	0
Timothy Cook	55	0.02%	0	0	0
Bobby Jindal (withdrawn)	53	0.02%	0	0	0
Frank Lynch	47	0.02%	0	0	0
Joe Robinson	44	0.02%	0	0	0
Stephen Bradley Comley	32	0.01%	0	0	0
Chomi Prag	16	0.01%	0	0	0
Jacob Daniel Dyas	15	0.01%	0	0	0
Stephen John McCarthy	12	0%	0	0	0
Walter Iwachiw	9	0%	0	0	0
Kevin Glenn Huey	8	0%	0	0	0
Matt Drozd	6	0%	0	0	0
Robert Lawrence Mann	5	0%	0	0	0
Peter Messina	5	0%	0	0	0
Unprojected delegates:			0	0	0
Total:	285,916	100.00%	23	0	23
Source: The Green Papers

Note: Delegates were awarded to candidates who got 10% or more of the vote proportionally. Of the 25 candidate/hopefuls, five candidates garnered delegates.

=== Results by County ===
2016 New Hampshire Republican Primaries (By County)
County	Donald Trump		John Kasich		Ted Cruz		Jeb Bush		Marco Rubio		Chris Christie		All Other Candidates (Note: Includes the vote totals of Carly Fiorina, Ben Carson, Rand Paul, Mike Huckabee, Rick Santorum, and any other write-in candidates or votes.)		Total
County	#	%	#	%	#	%	#	%	#	%	#	%	#	%	Total
Belknap	5,508	35.16%	2,464	15.73%	2,019	12.89%	1,741	11.11%	1,511	9.64%	1,002	6.40%	1,422	9.07%	15,667
Carroll	4,170	33.95%	2,279	18.55%	1,357	11.05%	1,240	10.09%	1,430	11.64%	883	7.19%	925	7.54%	12,284
Cheshire	4,533	33.42%	2,177	16.05%	1,888	13.92%	1,500	11.06%	1,237	9.12%	754	5.56%	1,473	10.87%	13,562
Coos	2,184	36.99%	943	15.97%	601	10.18%	562	9.52%	614	10.40%	355	6.01%	645	10.93%	5,904
Grafton	4,897	29.36%	3,475	20.83%	1,726	10.35%	1,864	11.17%	1,926	11.55%	1,068	6.40%	1,725	10.35%	16,681
Hillsborough	29,328	34.89%	12,517	14.89%	9,606	11.43%	9,584	11.40%	8,824	10.50%	7,155	8.51%	7,049	8.40%	84,063
Merrimack	10,959	33.02%	6,178	18.61%	3,781	11.39%	3,814	11.49%	3,062	9.23%	2,376	7.16%	3,022	9.11%	33,192
Rockingham	28,718	38.73%	10,370	13.98%	7,991	10.78%	7,748	10.45%	8,074	10.89%	5,783	7.80%	5,474	7.37%	74,158
Strafford	7,358	33.40%	3,195	14.50%	3,324	15.09%	2,444	11.10%	2,505	11.37%	1,225	5.56%	1,976	8.97%	22,027
Sullivan	3,080	36.73%	1,334	15.91%	951	11.34%	844	10.07%	888	10.59%	488	5.82%	800	9.54%	8,385
Totals	100,735	35.23%	44,932	15.71%	33,244	11.63%	31,341	10.96%	30,071	10.52%	21,089	7.38%	24,511	8.58%	285,923

==== South Carolina ====
Primary date: February 20, 2016
District conventions: April 2016
State convention: May 7, 2016
National delegates: 50

County results of the South Carolina Republican presidential primaries, 2016. Donald Trump Marco Rubio

South Carolina Republican primary, February 20, 2016
Candidate	Votes	Percentage	Actual delegate count		
Candidate	Votes	Percentage	Bound	Unbound	Total
Donald Trump	240,882	32.51%	50	0	50
Marco Rubio	166,565	22.48%	0	0	0
Ted Cruz	165,417	22.33%	0	0	0
Jeb Bush	58,056	7.84%	0	0	0
John Kasich	56,410	7.61%	0	0	0
Ben Carson	53,551	7.23%	0	0	0
Chris Christie (withdrawn)			0	0	0
Carly Fiorina (withdrawn)			0	0	0
Rand Paul (withdrawn)			0	0	0
Mike Huckabee (withdrawn)			0	0	0
Rick Santorum (withdrawn)			0	0	0
Jim Gilmore (withdrawn)			0	0	0
George Pataki (withdrawn)			0	0	0
Lindsey Graham (withdrawn)			0	0	0
Unprojected delegates:			0	0	0
Total:	740,881	100.00%	50	0	50
Source: The Green Papers

==== Nevada ====
Primary date: February 23, 2016
County conventions: March 12 – April 2, 2016 (presumably)
State convention: May 7 – 8, 2016 (presumably)
National delegates: 30

County results of the Nevada Republican presidential caucus, 2016. Donald Trump Ted Cruz

Nevada Republican precinct caucuses, February 23, 2016
Candidate	Votes	Percentage	Actual delegate count		
Candidate	Votes	Percentage	Bound	Unbound	Total
Donald Trump	34,531	45.75%	14	0	14
Marco Rubio	17,940	23.77%	7	0	7
Ted Cruz	16,079	21.30%	6	0	6
Ben Carson	3,619	4.79%	2	0	2
John Kasich	2,709	3.59%	1	0	1
Invalid	266	0.35%	0	0	0
Rand Paul (withdrawn)	170	0.23%	0	0	0
Jeb Bush (withdrawn)	64	0.08%	0	0	0
Chris Christie (withdrawn)	50	0.07%	0	0	0
Carly Fiorina (withdrawn)	22	0.03%	0	0	0
Mike Huckabee (withdrawn)	21	0.03%	0	0	0
Rick Santorum (withdrawn)	11	0.01%	0	0	0
Jim Gilmore (withdrawn)			0	0	0
Unprojected delegates:			0	0	0
Total:	75,482	100.00%	30	0	30
Source: The Green Papers

=== Super Tuesday ===
Super Tuesday is the name for March 1, 2016, the day on which the largest simultaneous number of state presidential primary elections will be held in the United States. It will include Republican primaries in nine states and caucuses in two states, totaling 595 delegates (24.1% of the total). North Dakota holds the last caucus on Super Tuesday, but there is no presidential straw poll, and all the delegates elected later at its convention will be unbound. Colorado and Wyoming take a straw poll, but it is non-binding, and no delegates are allocated on Super Tuesday. The 2016 schedule has been dubbed the "SEC Primary", since many of the participating states are represented in the U.S. collegiate Southeastern Conference.

The participating states include Alabama, Alaska caucuses, Arkansas, Georgia, Massachusetts, Minnesota caucuses, Oklahoma, Tennessee, Texas, Vermont, and Virginia.

Super Tuesday map

Super Tuesday 2016 (Republican Party, results)

Super Tuesday overview
Candidate	States won	Votes	Projected delegate count		
Candidate	States won	Votes	TGP	CNN	FOX
Donald Trump	7	2,955,120	254	251	237
Ted Cruz	3	2,502,557	218	212	209
Marco Rubio	1	1,881,068	96	97	94
John Kasich	0	546,465	21	21	19
Ben Carson	0	493,912	3	3	3
Unprojected delegates:			3	11	33
Total:	11	8,581,841	595	595	595

==== Alabama ====
Primary date: March 1, 2016
National delegates: 50

County results of the Alabama Republican presidential primaries, 2016 Donald Trump

Alabama Republican primary, March 1, 2016
Candidate	Votes	Percentage	Actual delegate count		
Candidate	Votes	Percentage	Bound	Unbound	Total
Donald Trump	373,721	43.42%	36	0	36
Ted Cruz	181,479	21.09%	13	0	13
Marco Rubio	160,606	18.66%	1	0	1
Ben Carson	88,094	10.24%	0	0	0
John Kasich	38,119	4.43%	0	0	0
Uncommitted	7,953	0.92%	0	0	0
Jeb Bush (withdrawn)	3,974	0.46%	0	0	0
Mike Huckabee (withdrawn)	2,539	0.30%	0	0	0
Rand Paul (withdrawn)	1,895	0.22%	0	0	0
Chris Christie (withdrawn)	858	0.10%	0	0	0
Rick Santorum (withdrawn)	617	0.07%	0	0	0
Carly Fiorina (withdrawn)	544	0.06%	0	0	0
Lindsey Graham (withdrawn)	253	0.03%	0	0	0
Unprojected delegates:			0	0	0
Total:	860,652	100.00%	50	0	50
Source: The Green Papers

==== Alaska ====
Primary date: March 1, 2016
National delegates: 28

Borough results of the Alaska Republican presidential primaries, 2016 Donald Trump Ted Cruz Ben Carson

Alaska Republican legislative district conventions, March 1, 2016
Candidate	Votes	Percentage	Actual delegate count		
Candidate	Votes	Percentage	Bound	Unbound	Total
Ted Cruz	8,369	36.37%	12	0	12
Donald Trump	7,740	33.64%	11	0	11
Marco Rubio	3,488	15.16%	5	0	5
Ben Carson	2,492	10.83%	0	0	0
John Kasich	918	3.99%	0	0	0
Unprojected delegates:			0	0	0
Total:	23,010	100.00%	28	0	28
Source: The Green Papers and Alaska Republican Party

==== Arkansas ====
Primary date: March 1, 2016
National delegates: 40

County results of the Arkansas Republican presidential caucuses, 2016. Ted Cruz Donald Trump Marco Rubio

Arkansas Republican primary, March 1, 2016
Candidate	Votes	Percentage	Actual delegate count		
Candidate	Votes	Percentage	Bound	Unbound	Total
Donald Trump	134,744	32.79%	16	0	16
Ted Cruz	125,340	30.50%	15	0	15
Marco Rubio	101,910	24.80%	9	0	9
Ben Carson	23,521	5.72%	0	0	0
John Kasich	15,305	3.72%	0	0	0
Mike Huckabee (withdrawn)	4,792	1.17%	0	0	0
Jeb Bush (withdrawn)	2,402	0.58%	0	0	0
Rand Paul (withdrawn)	1,151	0.28%	0	0	0
Chris Christie (withdrawn)	631	0.15%	0	0	0
Carly Fiorina (withdrawn)	411	0.10%	0	0	0
Rick Santorum (withdrawn)	292	0.07%	0	0	0
Lindsey Graham (withdrawn)	252	0.06%	0	0	0
Bobby Jindal (withdrawn)	169	0.04%	0	0	0
Unprojected delegates:			0	0	0
Total:	410,920	100.00%	40	0	40
Source: The Green Papers

==== Georgia ====
Primary date: March 1, 2016
National delegates: 76

County results of the Georgia Republican presidential primaries, 2016 Donald Trump Marco Rubio

Georgia Republican primary, March 1, 2016
Candidate	Votes	Percentage	Actual delegate count		
Candidate	Votes	Percentage	Bound	Unbound	Total
Donald Trump	502,994	38.81%	42	0	42
Marco Rubio	316,836	24.45%	16	0	16
Ted Cruz	305,847	23.60%	18	0	18
Ben Carson	80,723	6.23%	0	0	0
John Kasich	72,508	5.59%	0	0	0
Jeb Bush (withdrawn)	7,686	0.59%	0	0	0
Rand Paul (withdrawn)	2,910	0.22%	0	0	0
Mike Huckabee (withdrawn)	2,625	0.20%	0	0	0
Chris Christie (withdrawn)	1,486	0.11%	0	0	0
Carly Fiorina (withdrawn)	1,146	0.09%	0	0	0
Rick Santorum (withdrawn)	539	0.04%	0	0	0
Lindsey Graham (withdrawn)	428	0.03%	0	0	0
George Pataki (withdrawn)	236	0.02%	0	0	0
Unprojected delegates:			0	0	0
Total:	1,295,964	100.00%	76	0	76
Source: The Green Papers

==== Massachusetts ====
Primary date: March 1, 2016
National delegates: 42

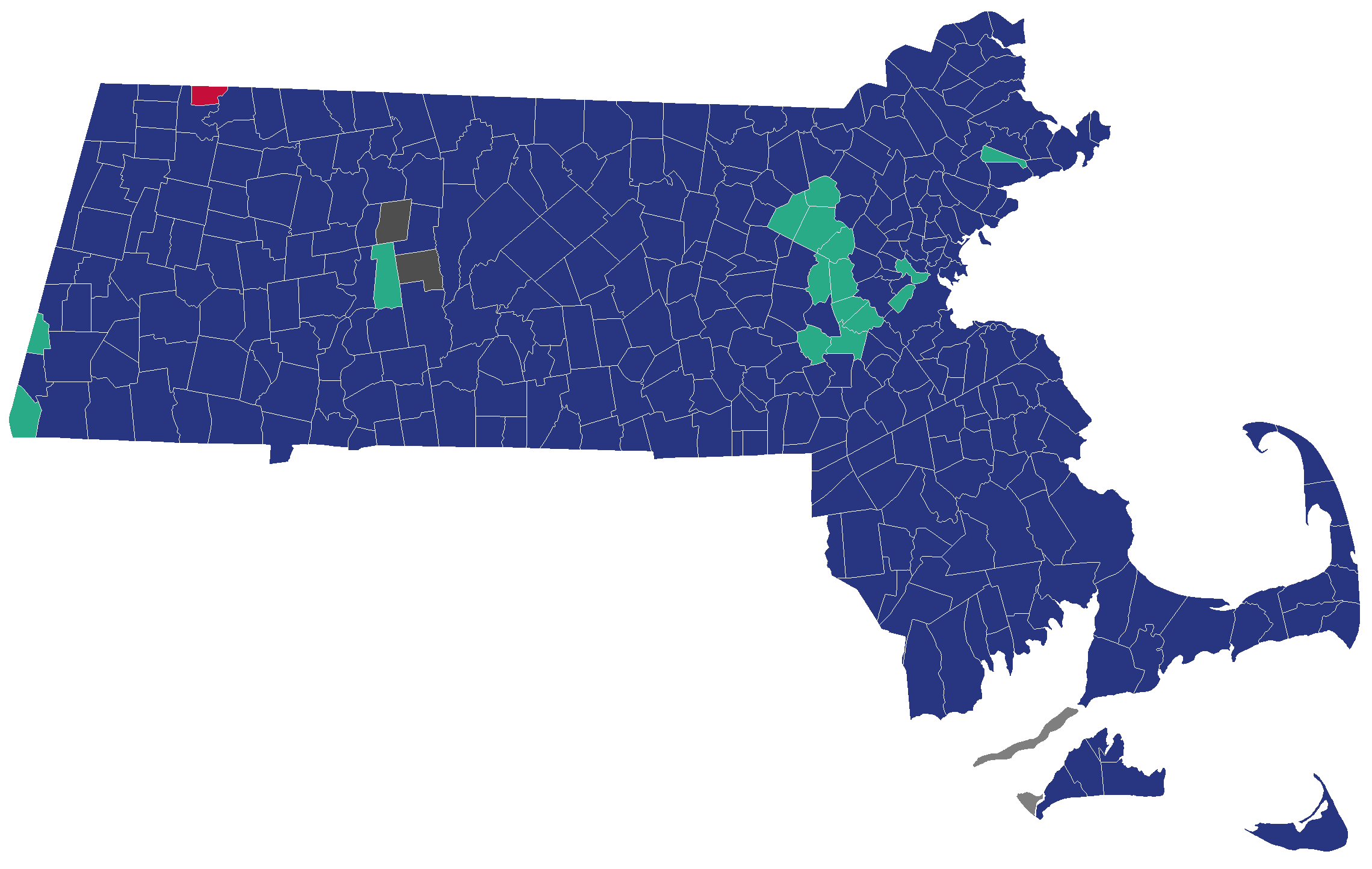
Municipal results of the Massachusetts Republican presidential primaries, 2016 Donald Trump John Kasich Marco Rubio Tie

County results of the Massachusetts Republican presidential primaries, 2016 Donald Trump

Massachusetts Republican primary, March 1, 2016
Candidate	Votes	Percentage	Actual delegate count		
Candidate	Votes	Percentage	Bound	Unbound	Total
Donald Trump	312,425	48.99%	22	0	22
John Kasich	114,434	17.94%	8	0	8
Marco Rubio	113,170	17.75%	8	0	8
Ted Cruz	60,592	9.50%	4	0	4
Ben Carson	16,360	2.57%	0	0	0
Jeb Bush (withdrawn)	6,559	1.03%	0	0	0
No Preference	3,220	0.50%	0	0	0
Others	2,325	0.36%	0	0	0
Chris Christie (withdrawn)	1,906	0.30%	0	0	0
Rand Paul (withdrawn)	1,864	0.29%	0	0	0
Blank Votes	1,440	0.23%	0	0	0
Carly Fiorina (withdrawn)	1,153	0.18%	0	0	0
Jim Gilmore (withdrawn)	753	0.12%	0	0	0
Mike Huckabee (withdrawn)	709	0.11%	0	0	0
George Pataki (withdrawn)	500	0.08%	0	0	0
Rick Santorum (withdrawn)	293	0.05%	0	0	0
Unprojected delegates:			0	0	0
Total:	637,703	100.00%	42	0	42
Source: The Green Papers

==== Minnesota ====
Precinct Caucuses date: March 1, 2016
State Convention: May 20–21, 2016
National delegates: 38

County results of the Minnesota Republican presidential primaries, 2016 Ted Cruz Marco Rubio Donald Trump Tie

2016 Minnesota Republican caucuses results
Candidate	Votes	Percentage	Delegates
Marco Rubio	41,397	36.24%	17
Ted Cruz	33,181	29.04%	13
Donald Trump	24,473	21.42%	8
Ben Carson	8,422	7.37%	0
John Kasich	6,565	5.75%	0
Write-ins	207	0.18%	0
Total	114,245	100.00%	38
Source: Office of the Minnesota Secretary of State

==== Oklahoma ====
Primary date: March 1, 2016
National delegates: 43

County results of the Oklahoma Republican presidential caucuses, 2016. Ted Cruz Donald Trump Marco Rubio

Oklahoma Republican primary, March 1, 2016
Candidate	Votes	Percentage	Actual delegate count		
Candidate	Votes	Percentage	Bound	Unbound	Total
Ted Cruz	158,078	34.37%	15	0	15
Donald Trump	130,267	28.32%	14	0	14
Marco Rubio	119,633	26.01%	12	0	12
Ben Carson	28,601	6.22%	0	0	0
John Kasich	16,524	3.59%	0	0	0
Jeb Bush (withdrawn)	2,091	0.45%	0	0	0
Rand Paul (withdrawn)	1,666	0.36%	0	0	0
Mike Huckabee (withdrawn)	1,308	0.28%	0	0	0
Carly Fiorina (withdrawn)	610	0.13%	0	0	0
Chris Christie (withdrawn)	545	0.12%	0	0	0
Rick Santorum (withdrawn)	375	0.08%	0	0	0
Lindsey Graham (withdrawn)	224	0.05%	0	0	0
Unprojected delegates:			2	0	2
Total:	459,922	100.00%	43	0	43
Source: The Green Papers

==== Tennessee ====
Primary date: March 1, 2016
National delegates: 58

County results of the Tennessee Republican presidential primaries, 2016 Donald Trump Marco Rubio

Tennessee Republican primary, March 1, 2016
Candidate	Votes	Percentage	Actual delegate count		
Candidate	Votes	Percentage	Bound	Unbound	Total
Donald Trump	333,180	38.94%	33	0	33
Ted Cruz	211,471	24.71%	16	0	16
Marco Rubio	181,274	21.18%	9	0	9
Ben Carson	64,951	7.59%	0	0	0
John Kasich	45,301	5.29%	0	0	0
Jeb Bush (withdrawn)	9,551	1.12%	0	0	0
Mike Huckabee (withdrawn)	2,415	0.28%	0	0	0
Rand Paul (withdrawn)	2,350	0.27%	0	0	0
Uncommitted	1,849	0.22%	0	0	0
Chris Christie (withdrawn)	1,256	0.15%	0	0	0
Carly Fiorina (withdrawn)	715	0.08%	0	0	0
Rick Santorum (withdrawn)	710	0.08%	0	0	0
Jim Gilmore (withdrawn)	267	0.03%	0	0	0
Lindsey Graham (withdrawn)	253	0.03%	0	0	0
George Pataki (withdrawn)	186	0.02%	0	0	0
Unprojected delegates:			0	0	0
Total:	855,729	100.00%	58	0	58
Source: The Green Papers

==== Texas ====
Primary date: March 1, 2016
National delegates: 155

County results of the Texas Republican presidential primary, 2016. Ted Cruz Donald Trump

Texas Republican primary, March 1, 2016
Candidate	Votes	Percentage	Actual delegate count		
Candidate	Votes	Percentage	Bound	Unbound	Total
Ted Cruz	1,241,118	43.76%	104	0	104
Donald Trump	758,762	26.75%	48	0	48
Marco Rubio	503,055	17.74%	3	0	3
John Kasich	120,473	4.25%	0	0	0
Ben Carson	117,969	4.16%	0	0	0
Jeb Bush (withdrawn)	35,420	1.25%	0	0	0
Uncommitted	29,609	1.04%	0	0	0
Rand Paul (withdrawn)	8,000	0.28%	0	0	0
Mike Huckabee (withdrawn)	6,226	0.22%	0	0	0
Elizabeth Gray (withdrawn)	5,449	0.19%	0	0	0
Chris Christie (withdrawn)	3,448	0.12%	0	0	0
Carly Fiorina (withdrawn)	3,247	0.11%	0	0	0
Rick Santorum (withdrawn)	2,006	0.07%	0	0	0
Lindsey Graham (withdrawn)	1,706	0.06%	0	0	0
Unprojected delegates:			0	0	0
Total:	2,836,488	100.00%	155	0	155
Source: The Green Papers

==== Vermont ====
Primary date: March 1, 2016
National delegates: 16

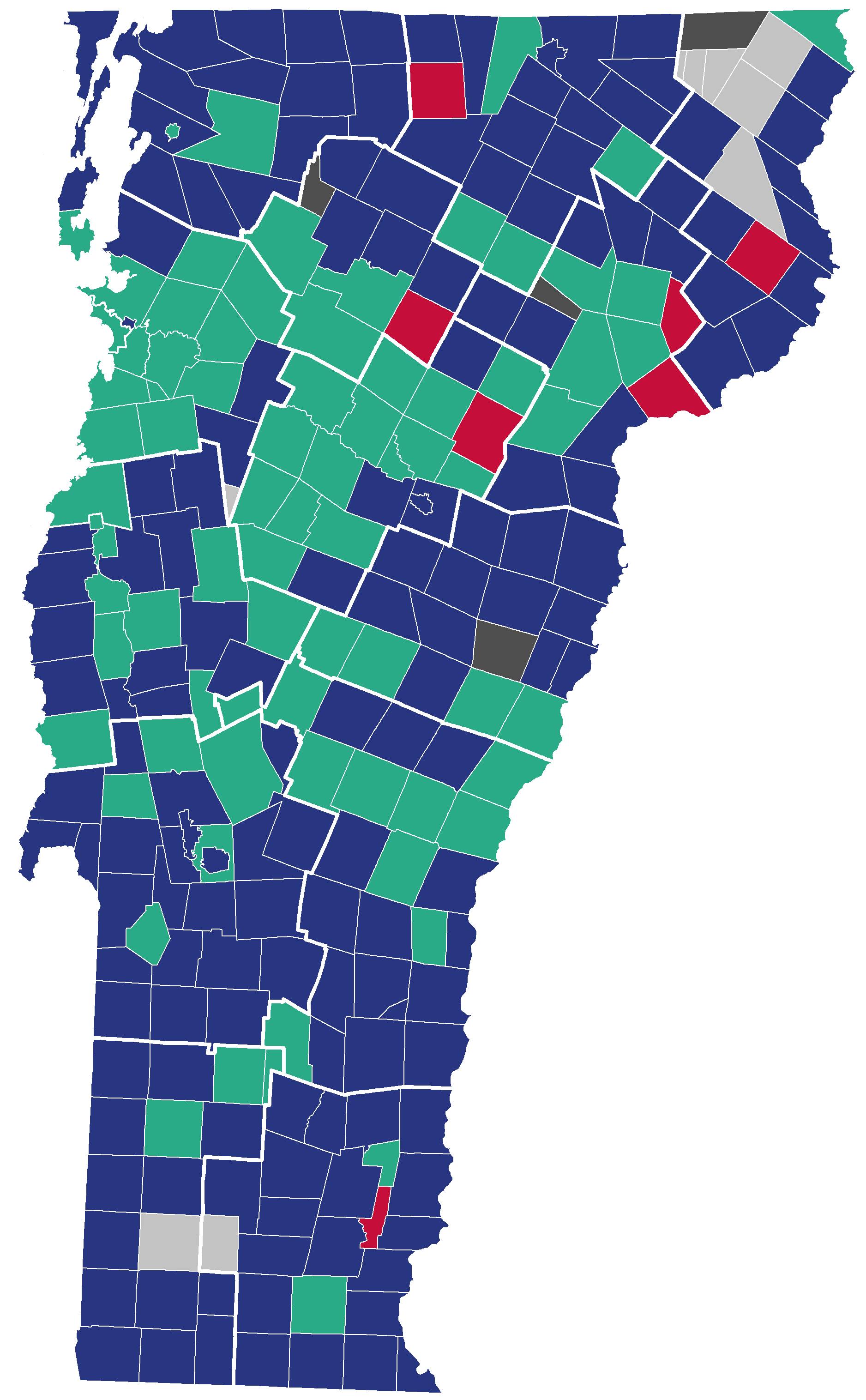
County (left) and Municipal (right) results of the Vermont Republican primaries, 2016.
Donald Trump
John Kasich
Marco Rubio
Tie
Not reported (Note: The Associated Press did not report results from nine municipalities where the number of registered voters was significantly low.)

Vermont Republican primary, March 1, 2016
Candidate	Votes	Percentage	Actual delegate count		
Candidate	Votes	Percentage	Bound	Unbound	Total
Donald Trump	19,974	32.34%	8	0	8
John Kasich	18,534	30.01%	8	0	8
Marco Rubio	11,781	19.08%	0	0	0
Ted Cruz	5,932	9.61%	0	0	0
Ben Carson	2,551	4.13%	0	0	0
Jeb Bush (withdrawn)	1,106	1.79%	0	0	0
Rand Paul (withdrawn)	423	0.68%	0	0	0
Chris Christie (withdrawn)	361	0.58%	0	0	0
Carly Fiorina (withdrawn)	212	0.34%	0	0	0
Rick Santorum (withdrawn)	164	0.27%	0	0	0
Unprojected delegates:			0	0	0
Total:	61,756	100.00%	16	0	16
Source: The Green Papers

==== Virginia ====
Primary date: March 1, 2016
National delegates: 49

County and independent city results of the Virginia Republican presidential primary, 2016. Donald Trump Marco Rubio

Virginia Republican primary, March 1, 2016
Candidate	Votes	Percentage	Actual delegate count		
Candidate	Votes	Percentage	Bound	Unbound	Total
Donald Trump	356,840	34.80%	17	0	17
Marco Rubio	327,918	31.98%	16	0	16
Ted Cruz	171,150	16.69%	8	0	8
John Kasich	97,784	9.54%	5	0	5
Ben Carson	60,228	5.87%	3	0	3
Jeb Bush (withdrawn)	3,645	0.36%	0	0	0
Rand Paul (withdrawn)	2,917	0.28%	0	0	0
Mike Huckabee (withdrawn)	1,458	0.14%	0	0	0
Chris Christie (withdrawn)	1,102	0.11%	0	0	0
Carly Fiorina (withdrawn)	914	0.09%	0	0	0
Jim Gilmore (withdrawn)	653	0.06%	0	0	0
Lindsey Graham (withdrawn)	444	0.04%	0	0	0
Rick Santorum (withdrawn)	399	0.04%	0	0	0
Unprojected delegates:			0	0	0
Total:	1,025,452	100.00%	49	0	49

=== Early-March states ===
On March 5, 2016, one state held a primary while three others held caucuses. Because of the relative timeframe between Super Tuesday and because more than 100 delegates were awarded to each state's respective winner, the media has dubbed this date as "Super-Saturday." The following day, Puerto Rico voted in their own primary and between March 8 and April 1, 17 more states have voted or will vote.

==== Maine ====
Primary date: March 5, 2016
National delegates: 23

County results of the Maine Republican presidential primaries, 2016 Ted Cruz Donald Trump

Maine Republican municipal caucuses, March 5, 2016
Candidate	Votes	Percentage	Actual delegate count		
Candidate	Votes	Percentage	Bound	Unbound	Total
Ted Cruz	8,550	45.90%	12	0	12
Donald Trump	6,070	32.59%	9	0	9
John Kasich	2,270	12.19%	2	0	2
Marco Rubio	1,492	8.01%	0	0	0
Ben Carson (withdrawn)	132	0.71%	0	0	0
Rand Paul (withdrawn)	55	0.3%	0	0	0
Jeb Bush (withdrawn)	31	0.17%	0	0	0
Carly Fiorina (withdrawn)	17	0.09%	0	0	0
Mike Huckabee (withdrawn)	10	0.05%	0	0	0
Unprojected delegates:			0	0	0
Total:	18,627	100%	23	0	23
Source: The Green Papers

==== Kansas ====
Primary date: March 5, 2016
National delegates: 40

Congressional district results of the Kansas Republican presidential Caucus, 2016. Ted Cruz

Kansas Republican precinct caucuses, March 5, 2016
Candidate	Votes	Percentage	Actual delegate count		
Candidate	Votes	Percentage	Bound	Unbound	Total
Ted Cruz	37,512	47.50%	24	0	24
Donald Trump	18,443	23.35%	9	0	9
Marco Rubio	13,295	16.83%	6	0	6
John Kasich	8,741	11.07%	1	0	1
Ben Carson (withdrawn)	582	0.74%	0	0	0
Uncommitted	279	0.35%	0	0	0
Jeb Bush (withdrawn)	84	0.11%	0	0	0
Carly Fiorina (withdrawn)	42	0.05%	0	0	0
Unprojected delegates:			0	0	0
Total:	78,978	100.00%	40	0	40
Source: The Green Papers

==== Kentucky ====
Primary date: March 5, 2016
National delegates: 46

County results of the Kentucky Republican presidential caucuses, 2016 Ted Cruz Donald Trump

Kentucky Republican caucuses, March 2016
Candidate	Votes	Percentage	Actual delegate count		
Candidate	Votes	Percentage	Bound	Unbound	Total
Donald Trump	82,493	35.92%	17	0	17
Ted Cruz	72,503	31.57%	15	0	15
Marco Rubio	37,579	16.36%	7	0	7
John Kasich	33,134	14.43%	7	0	7
Ben Carson (withdrawn)	1,951	0.85%	0	0	0
Rand Paul (withdrawn)	872	0.38%	0	0	0
Uncommitted	496	0.22%	0	0	0
Jeb Bush (withdrawn)	305	0.13%	0	0	0
Mike Huckabee (withdrawn)	174	0.08%	0	0	0
Chris Christie (withdrawn)	65	0.03%	0	0	0
Carly Fiorina (withdrawn)	64	0.03%	0	0	0
Rick Santorum (withdrawn)	31	0.03%	0	0	0
Total:	229,667	100.00%	40	0	40
Source: The Green Papers, Republican Party of Kentucky

==== Louisiana ====
Primary date: March 5, 2016
National delegates: 46

Parish results of the Louisiana Republican presidential caucuses, 2016 Ted Cruz Donald Trump

Louisiana Republican primary, March 5, 2016
Candidate	Votes	Percentage	Actual delegate count		
Candidate	Votes	Percentage	Bound	Unbound	Total
Donald Trump	124,854	41.45%	25	0	25
Ted Cruz	113,968	37.83%	18	0	18
Marco Rubio	33,813	11.22%	0	0	0
John Kasich	19,359	6.43%	0	0	0
Ben Carson (withdrawn)	4,544	1.51%	0	0	0
Jeb Bush (withdrawn)	2,145	0.71%	0	0	0
Rand Paul (withdrawn)	670	0.22%	0	0	0
Mike Huckabee (withdrawn)	645	0.21%	0	0	0
Chris Christie (withdrawn)	401	0.13%	0	0	0
Carly Fiorina (withdrawn)	243	0.08%	0	0	0
Rick Santorum (withdrawn)	180	0.06%	0	0	0
Lindsey Graham (withdrawn)	152	0.05%	0	0	0
Unprojected delegates:			3	0	3
Total:	301,241	100.00%	46	0	46
Source: The Green Papers

==== Puerto Rico ====
Primary date: March 6, 2016
National delegates: 23

Puerto Rico Republican primary, March 6, 2016
Candidate	Votes	Percentage	Actual delegate count		
Candidate	Votes	Percentage	Bound	Unbound	Total
Marco Rubio	28,937	70.24%	23	0	23
Donald Trump	5,474	13.29%	0	0	0
Ted Cruz	3,610	8.76%	0	0	0
Other	1,540	3.74%	0	0	0
John Kasich	582	1.41%	0	0	0
Carly Fiorina (withdrawn)	375	0.91%	0	0	0
Jeb Bush (withdrawn)	296	0.72%	0	0	0
Ben Carson (withdrawn)	168	0.41%	0	0	0
Mike Huckabee (withdrawn)	77	0.19%	0	0	0
Rand Paul (withdrawn)	48	0.12%	0	0	0
Rick Santorum (withdrawn)	36	0.09%	0	0	0
Jim Gilmore (withdrawn)	30	0.07%	0	0	0
Chris Christie (withdrawn)	23	0.06%	0	0	0
Unprojected delegates:			0	0	0
Total:	41,196	100%	23	0	23
Source: The Green Papers

==== Hawaii ====
Caucus date: March 8, 2016
National delegates: 19

County results of the Hawaii Republican presidential Caucuses, 2016. Donald Trump

Hawaii Republican precinct caucuses, March 8, 2016
Candidate	Votes	Percentage	Actual delegate count		
Candidate	Votes	Percentage	Bound	Unbound	Total
Donald Trump	6,805	43.32%	11	0	11
Ted Cruz	5,063	32.23%	7	0	7
Marco Rubio	2,068	13.17%	1	0	1
John Kasich	1,566	9.97%	0	0	0
Ben Carson (withdrawn)	146	0.93%	0	0	0
Jeb Bush (withdrawn)	24	0.15%	0	0	0
Write-In	25	0.16%	0	0	0
Spoiled	11	0.07%	0	0	0
Unprojected delegates:			0	0	0
Total:	15,708	100.00%	19	0	19
Source: The Green Papers

==== Idaho ====
Primary date: March 8, 2016
National delegates: 32

County results of the Idaho Republican presidential primary, 2016. Ted Cruz Donald Trump

Idaho Republican primary, March 8, 2016
Candidate	Votes	Percentage	Actual delegate count		
Candidate	Votes	Percentage	Bound	Unbound	Total
Ted Cruz	100,889	45.44%	20	0	20
Donald Trump	62,413	28.11%	12	0	12
Marco Rubio	35,290	15.90%	0	0	0
John Kasich	16,514	7.44%	0	0	0
Ben Carson (withdrawn)	3,853	1.74%	0	0	0
Jeb Bush (withdrawn)	939	0.42%	0	0	0
Rand Paul (withdrawn)	834	0.38%	0	0	0
Mike Huckabee (withdrawn)	358	0.16%	0	0	0
Chris Christie (withdrawn)	353	0.16%	0	0	0
Carly Fiorina (withdrawn)	242	0.11%	0	0	0
Rick Santorum (withdrawn)	211	0.10%	0	0	0
Lindsey Graham (withdrawn)	80	0.04%	0	0	0
Peter Messina (withdrawn)	28	0.01%	0	0	0
Unprojected delegates:			0	0	0
Total:	222,004	100.00%	32	0	32
Source: The Green Papers

==== Michigan ====
Primary date: March 8, 2016
National delegates: 59

County results of the Michigan Republican presidential primary, 2016. Ted Cruz Donald Trump John Kasich

Michigan Republican primary, March 8, 2016
Candidate	Votes	Percentage	Actual delegate count		
Candidate	Votes	Percentage	Bound	Unbound	Total
Donald Trump	483,753	36.55%	25	0	25
Ted Cruz	326,617	24.68%	17	0	17
John Kasich	321,115	24.26%	17	0	17
Marco Rubio	123,587	9.34%	0	0	0
Ben Carson (withdrawn)	21,349	1.61%	0	0	0
Uncommitted	22,824	1.72%	0	0	0
Jeb Bush (withdrawn)	10,685	0.81%	0	0	0
Rand Paul (withdrawn)	3,774	0.29%	0	0	0
Chris Christie (withdrawn)	3,116	0.24%	0	0	0
Mike Huckabee (withdrawn)	2,603	0.20%	0	0	0
Rick Santorum (withdrawn)	1,722	0.13%	0	0	0
Carly Fiorina (withdrawn)	1,415	0.11%	0	0	0
George Pataki (withdrawn)	591	0.04%	0	0	0
Lindsey Graham (withdrawn)	438	0.03%	0	0	0
Unprojected delegates:			0	0	0
Total:	1,323,589	100.00%	59	0	59
Source: The Green Papers

==== Mississippi ====
Primary date: March 8, 2016
National delegates: 40

County results of the Mississippi Republican presidential primary, 2016. Ted Cruz Donald Trump

Mississippi Republican primary, March 8, 2016
Candidate	Votes	Percentage	Actual delegate count		
Candidate	Votes	Percentage	Bound	Unbound	Total
Donald Trump	196,659	47.24%	25	0	25
Ted Cruz	150,364	36.12%	15	0	15
John Kasich	36,795	8.84%	0	0	0
Marco Rubio	21,885	5.26%	0	0	0
Ben Carson (withdrawn)	5,626	1.35%	0	0	0
Jeb Bush (withdrawn)	1,697	0.41%	0	0	0
Mike Huckabee (withdrawn)	1,067	0.26%	0	0	0
Rand Paul (withdrawn)	643	0.15%	0	0	0
Rick Santorum (withdrawn)	510	0.12%	0	0	0
Chris Christie (withdrawn)	493	0.12%	0	0	0
Carly Fiorina (withdrawn)	224	0.05%	0	0	0
Lindsey Graham (withdrawn)	172	0.04%	0	0	0
George Pataki (withdrawn)	135	0.03%	0	0	0
Unprojected delegates:			0	0	0
Total:	416,270	100.00%	40	0	40
Source: The Green Papers

==== US Virgin Islands ====
Caucus date: March 10, 2016
National delegates: 9

Virgin Islands Republican territorial caucus, March 10, 2016
Candidate	Votes	Percentage	Actual delegate count		
Candidate	Votes	Percentage	Bound	Unbound	Total
Uncommitted	1,063	65.3%	1	0	0
Ted Cruz	191	11.7%	0	0	0
Marco Rubio	161	9.9%	0	0	0
Ben Carson (withdrawn)	108	6.6%	0	0	0
Donald Trump	104	6.4%	5	3	8
Unprojected delegates:			0	0	0
Total:	1,627	100.00%	6	3	9

=== Mid-March states ===
==== District of Columbia ====
Convention date: March 12, 2016
National delegates: 19

Results by ward Marco Rubio No votes

District of Columbia Republican presidential convention, March 12, 2016
Candidate	Votes	Percentage	Actual delegate count		
Candidate	Votes	Percentage	Bound	Unbound	Total
Marco Rubio	1,059	37.3%	10	0	10
John Kasich	1,009	35.54%	9	0	9
Donald Trump	391	13.77%	0	0	0
Ted Cruz	351	12.36%	0	0	0
Jeb Bush (withdrawn)	14	0.49%	0	0	0
Rand Paul (withdrawn)	12	0.42%	0	0	0
Ben Carson (withdrawn)	3	0.11%	0	0	0
Unprojected delegates:			0	0	0
Total:	2,839	100%	19	0	19
Source: The Green Papers

==== Guam ====
Caucus date: March 12, 2016
National delegates: 9

Guam Republican territorial caucus, March 12, 2016
Candidate	Actual delegate count		
Candidate	Bound	Unbound	Total
Uncommitted	0	9	9
Ted Cruz	0	0	0
John Kasich	0	0	0
Marco Rubio	0	0	0
Donald Trump	0	0	0
Unprojected delegates:	0	0	0
Total:	0	9	9
Source: The Green Papers

Gov. Eddie Calvo, one of the delegates from Guam, had announced his support for Cruz prior to the March 12 Guam caucus. But, the slate of delegates all committed to Trump after both Cruz and Kasich dropped out.

==== Wyoming ====
County conventions date: March 12, 2016
National delegates: 12

Results of the Wyoming Republican county conventions, 2016 Ted Cruz Donald Trump Marco Rubio Uncommitted

Wyoming Republican county conventions, March 12, 2016
Candidate	Votes	Percentage	Actual delegate count		
Candidate	Votes	Percentage	Bound	Unbound	Total
Ted Cruz	1,128	70.94%	9	0	9
Marco Rubio	231	14.53%	1	0	1
Donald Trump	112	7.04%	1	0	1
John Kasich	42	2.64%	0	0	0
Others	2	0.13%	0	0	0
Undeclared	75	4.72%	1	0	1
Unprojected delegates:			0	0	0
Total:	1,590	100%	12	0	12
Source: The Green Papers and Wyoming Republican Party

==== Florida ====
Primary date: March 15, 2016
National delegates: 99

County results of the Florida Republican presidential primary, 2016 Donald Trump Marco Rubio

Florida Republican primary, March 15, 2016
Candidate	Votes	Percentage	Actual delegate count		
Candidate	Votes	Percentage	Bound	Unbound	Total
Donald Trump	1,079,870	45.72%	99	0	99
Marco Rubio	638,661	27.04%	0	0	0
Ted Cruz	404,891	17.14%	0	0	0
John Kasich	159,976	6.77%	0	0	0
Jeb Bush (withdrawn)	43,511	1.84%	0	0	0
Ben Carson (withdrawn)	21,207	0.90%	0	0	0
Rand Paul (withdrawn)	4,450	0.19%	0	0	0
Mike Huckabee (withdrawn)	2,624	0.11%	0	0	0
Chris Christie (withdrawn)	2,493	0.11%	0	0	0
Carly Fiorina (withdrawn)	1,899	0.08%	0	0	0
Rick Santorum (withdrawn)	1,211	0.05%	0	0	0
Lindsey Graham (withdrawn)	693	0.03%	0	0	0
Jim Gilmore (withdrawn)	319	0.01%	0	0	0
Unprojected delegates:			0	0	0
Total:	2,361,805	100.00%	99	0	99
Source: The Green Papers

==== Illinois ====
Primary date: March 15, 2016
National delegates: 69

County results of the Illinois Republican presidential primary, 2016 Ted Cruz Donald Trump

Illinois Republican primary, March 15, 2016
Candidate	Votes	Percentage	Actual delegate count		
Candidate	Votes	Percentage	Bound	Unbound	Total
Donald Trump	562,464	38.80%	54	0	54
Ted Cruz	438,235	30.23%	9	0	9
John Kasich	286,118	19.74%	6	0	6
Marco Rubio	126,681	8.74%	0	0	0
Ben Carson (withdrawn)	11,469	0.79%	0	0	0
Jeb Bush (withdrawn)	11,188	0.77%	0	0	0
Rand Paul (withdrawn)	4,718	0.33%	0	0	0
Chris Christie (withdrawn)	3,428	0.24%	0	0	0
Mike Huckabee (withdrawn)	2,737	0.19%	0	0	0
Carly Fiorina (withdrawn)	1,540	0.11%	0	0	0
Rick Santorum (withdrawn)	1,154	0.08%	0	0	0
Unprojected delegates:			0	0	0
Total:	1,449,748	100.00%	69	0	69
Source: The Green Papers

==== Missouri ====
Primary date: March 15, 2016
National delegates: 52

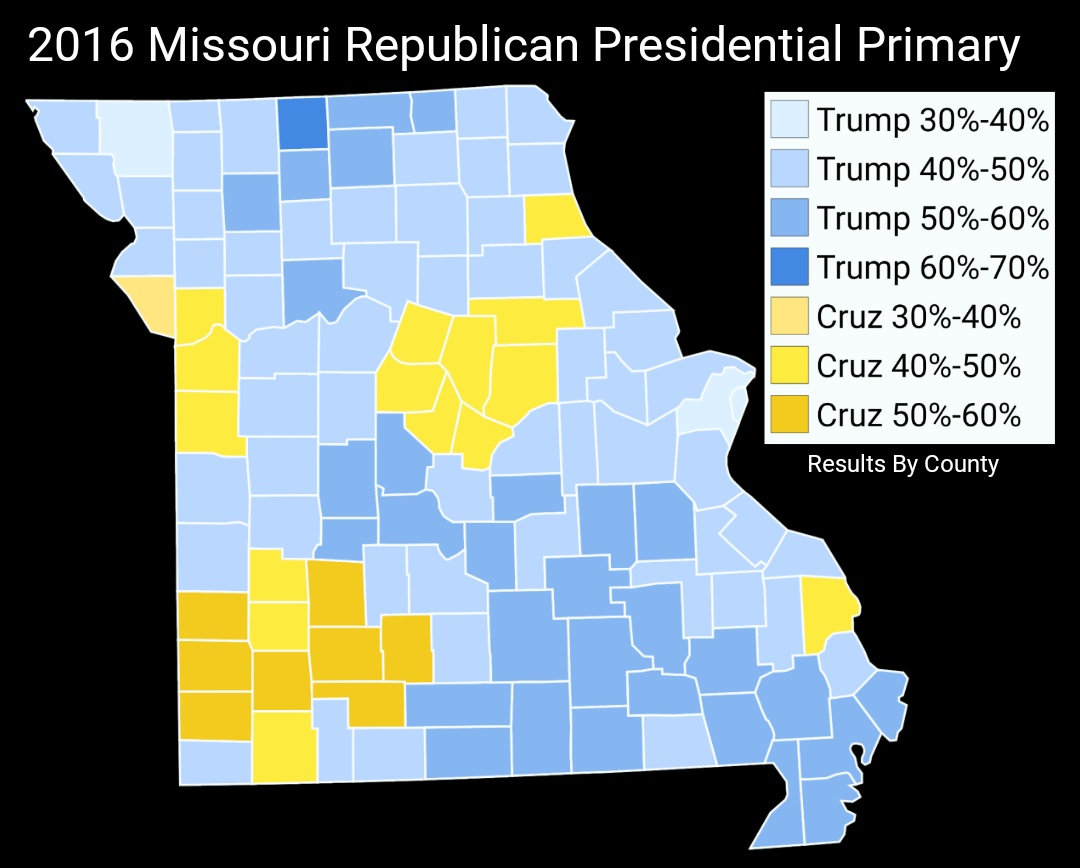
County results of the Missouri Republican presidential primary, 2016. Ted Cruz Donald Trump

Missouri Republican primary, March 15, 2016
Candidate	Votes	Percentage	Actual delegate count		
Candidate	Votes	Percentage	Bound	Unbound	Total
Donald Trump	383,631	40.84%	37	0	37
Ted Cruz	381,666	40.63%	15	0	15
John Kasich	94,857	10.10%	0	0	0
Marco Rubio	57,244	6.09%	0	0	0
Ben Carson (withdrawn)	8,233	0.88%	0	0	0
Jeb Bush (withdrawn)	3,361	0.36%	0	0	0
Uncommitted	3,225	0.34%	0	0	0
Mike Huckabee (withdrawn)	2,148	0.23%	0	0	0
Rand Paul (withdrawn)	1,777	0.19%	0	0	0
Chris Christie (withdrawn)	1,681	0.18%	0	0	0
Rick Santorum (withdrawn)	732	0.08%	0	0	0
Carly Fiorina (withdrawn)	615	0.07%	0	0	0
Jim Lynch (withdrawn)	100	0.01%	0	0	0
Unprojected delegates:			0	0	0
Total:	939,270	100.00%	52	0	52
Source: The Green Papers

==== Northern Mariana Islands ====
Caucus date: March 15, 2016
National delegates: 9

Northern Mariana Islands Republican caucus, March 15, 2016
Candidate	Votes	Percentage	Actual delegate count		
Candidate	Votes	Percentage	Bound	Unbound	Total
Donald Trump	343	72.82%	9	0	9
Ted Cruz	113	23.99%	0	0	0
John Kasich	10	2.12%	0	0	0
Marco Rubio	5	1.06%	0	0	0
Unprojected delegates:			0	0	0
Total:	471	100.00%	9	0	9
Sources: The Green Papers

==== North Carolina ====
Primary date: March 15, 2016
National delegates: 72

County results of the North Carolina Republican presidential primary, 2016. Ted Cruz Donald Trump

North Carolina Republican primary, March 15, 2016
Candidate	Votes	Percentage	Actual delegate count		
Candidate	Votes	Percentage	Bound	Unbound	Total
Donald Trump	462,413	40.23%	29	0	29
Ted Cruz	422,621	36.76%	27	0	27
John Kasich	145,659	12.67%	9	0	9
Marco Rubio	88,907	7.73%	6	0	6
Ben Carson (withdrawn)	11,019	0.96%	1	0	1
No Preference	6,081	0.53%	0	0	0
Jeb Bush (withdrawn)	3,893	0.34%	0	0	0
Mike Huckabee (withdrawn)	3,071	0.27%	0	0	0
Rand Paul (withdrawn)	2,753	0.24%	0	0	0
Chris Christie (withdrawn)	1,256	0.11%	0	0	0
Carly Fiorina (withdrawn)	929	0.08%	0	0	0
Rick Santorum (withdrawn)	663	0.06%	0	0	0
Jim Gilmore (withdrawn)	265	0.02%	0	0	0
Unprojected delegates:			0	0	0
Total:	1,149,530	100.00%	72	0	72
Source: The Green Papers

==== Ohio ====
Primary date: March 15, 2016
National delegates: 66

County results of the Ohio Republican presidential caucuses, 2016. John Kasich Donald Trump

Ohio Republican primary, March 15, 2016
Candidate	Votes	Percentage	Actual delegate count		
Candidate	Votes	Percentage	Bound	Unbound	Total
John Kasich	933,886	46.95%	66	0	66
Donald Trump	713,404	35.87%	0	0	0
Ted Cruz	264,640	13.31%	0	0	0
Marco Rubio	46,478	2.34%	0	0	0
Ben Carson (withdrawn)	14,351	0.72%	0	0	0
Jeb Bush (withdrawn)	5,398	0.27%	0	0	0
Mike Huckabee (withdrawn)	4,941	0.25%	0	0	0
Chris Christie (withdrawn)	2,430	0.12%	0	0	0
Carly Fiorina (withdrawn)	2,112	0.11%	0	0	0
Rick Santorum (withdrawn)	1,320	0.07%	0	0	0
Unprojected delegates:			0	0	0
Total:	1,988,960	100.00%	66	0	66
Source: The Green Papers

=== Late March states ===
==== Arizona ====
Primary date: March 22, 2016
National delegates: 58

County results of the Arizona Republican presidential primary, 2016. Ted Cruz Donald Trump

Arizona Republican primary, March 22, 2016
Candidate	Votes	Percentage	Actual delegate count		
Candidate	Votes	Percentage	Bound	Unbound	Total
Donald Trump	286,743	45.95%	58	0	58
Ted Cruz	172,294	27.61%	0	0	0
Marco Rubio (withdrawn)	72,304	11.59%	0	0	0
John Kasich	65,965	10.57%	0	0	0
Ben Carson (withdrawn)	14,940	2.39%	0	0	0
Jeb Bush (withdrawn)	4,393	0.70%	0	0	0
Rand Paul (withdrawn)	2,269	0.36%	0	0	0
Mike Huckabee (withdrawn)	1,300	0.21%	0	0	0
Carly Fiorina (withdrawn)	1,270	0.20%	0	0	0
Chris Christie (withdrawn)	988	0.16%	0	0	0
Rick Santorum (withdrawn)	523	0.08%	0	0	0
Lindsey Graham (withdrawn)	498	0.08%	0	0	0
George Pataki (withdrawn)	309	0.05%	0	0	0
Timothy Cook (withdrawn)	243	0.04%	0	0	0
Unprojected delegates:			0	0	0
Total:	624,039	100.00%	58	0	58
Source: The Green Papers

==== Utah ====
Caucus date: March 22, 2016
National delegates: 40

County results of the Utah Republican presidential caucuses, 2016. Ted Cruz

Utah Republican caucus, March 22, 2016
Candidate	Votes	Percentage	Actual delegate count		
Candidate	Votes	Percentage	Bound	Unbound	Total
Ted Cruz	132,904	69.46%	40	0	40
John Kasich	31,992	16.72%	0	0	0
Donald Trump	26,434	13.82%	0	0	0
Unprojected delegates:			0	0	0
Total:	191,330	100.00%	40	0	40
Source: The Green Papers

==== American Samoa ====
Caucus date: March 22, 2016
National delegates: 9

American Samoa Republican territorial caucus, March 22, 2016
Candidate	Votes	Percentage	Actual delegate count		
Candidate	Votes	Percentage	Bound	Unbound	Total
Donald Trump			0	9	9
Ted Cruz			0	0	0
Unprojected delegates:			0	0	0
Total:			0	9	9
Source: The Green Papers

=== April states ===
==== North Dakota ====
State Convention dates: April 1–3, 2016
National delegates: 28

North Dakota Republican state convention, April 1–3, 2016
Candidate	Actual delegate count		
Candidate	Bound	Unbound	Total
Donald Trump	0	17	17
Ted Cruz	0	11	11
John Kasich	0	0	0
(available)	0	0	0
Unprojected delegates:	0	0	0
Total:	0	28	28
Source: The Green Papers

==== Wisconsin ====
Primary date: April 5, 2016
National delegates: 42

County results of the Wisconsin Republican presidential primary, 2016. Ted Cruz Donald Trump

Wisconsin Republican primary, April 5, 2016
Candidate	Votes	Percentage	Actual delegate count		
Candidate	Votes	Percentage	Bound	Unbound	Total
Ted Cruz	533,079	48.20%	36	0	36
Donald Trump	387,295	35.02%	6	0	6
John Kasich	155,902	14.10%	0	0	0
Marco Rubio (withdrawn)	10,591	0.96%	0	0	0
Ben Carson (withdrawn)	5,660	0.51%	0	0	0
Jeb Bush (withdrawn)	3,054	0.28%	0	0	0
Rand Paul (withdrawn)	2,519	0.23%	0	0	0
Uncommitted	2,281	0.21%	0	0	0
Mike Huckabee (withdrawn)	1,424	0.13%	0	0	0
Chris Christie (withdrawn)	1,191	0.11%	0	0	0
Carly Fiorina (withdrawn)	772	0.07%	0	0	0
Rick Santorum (withdrawn)	511	0.05%	0	0	0
Jim Gilmore (withdrawn)	245	0.02%	0	0	0
Victor Williams (write-in)	39	<0.01%	0	0	0
Unprojected delegates:			0	0	0
Total:	1,105,944	100.00%	42	0	42
Source: The Green Papers

==== Colorado ====
District Conventions dates: April 2, 2016 (districts 1, 6), April 7 (district 7), and April 8 (districts 2, 3, 4, 5)
State Convention date: April 9, 2016
National delegates: 37

County results of the Colorado Republican presidential district conventions, 2016. Ted Cruz

Colorado Republican district conventions, April 2, 2016, April 7–8, 2016
Candidate	Votes	Percentage	Actual delegate count		
Candidate	Votes	Percentage	Bound	Unbound	Total
Ted Cruz	0	0.0%	17	4	21
Donald Trump	0	0.0%	0	0	0
John Kasich	0	0.0%	0	0	0
Marco Rubio (withdrawn)	0	0.0%	0	0	0
Ben Carson (withdrawn)	0	0.0%	0	0	0
Uncommitted	0	0.0%	0	0	0
Unprojected delegates:			0	0	0
Total:	0	100.00%	17	4	21
Source: The Green Papers

Colorado Republican state convention, April 9, 2016
Candidate	Votes	Percentage	Actual delegate count		
Candidate	Votes	Percentage	Bound	Unbound	Total
Ted Cruz	0	0.0%	13	0	13
Donald Trump	0	0.0%	0	1	1
John Kasich	0	0.0%	0	0	0
Marco Rubio (withdrawn)	0	0.0%	0	0	0
Ben Carson (withdrawn)	0	0.0%	0	0	0
Uncommitted	0	0.0%	0	0	0
Unprojected delegates:			0	2	2
Total:	0	100.00%	13	3	16
Source: The Green Papers

==== Wyoming ====
State Convention date: April 14–16, 2016
National delegates: 17

Wyoming Republican state convention, April 14-16, 2016
Candidate	Votes	Percentage	Actual delegate count		
Candidate	Votes	Percentage	Bound	Unbound	Total
Ted Cruz			14	1	15
(available)			0	2	2
Unprojected delegates:			0	0	0
Total:			14	3	17
Source: The Green Papers and Wyoming Republican Party

==== New York ====
Primary date: April 19, 2016
National delegates: 95

County results of the New York Republican presidential primary, 2016. Donald Trump John Kasich

New York Republican primary, April 19, 2016
Candidate	Votes	Percentage	Actual delegate count		
Candidate	Votes	Percentage	Bound	Unbound	Total
Donald Trump	554,522	59.21%	89	0	89
John Kasich	231,166	24.68%	6	0	6
Ted Cruz	136,083	14.53%	0	0	0
Blank & Void	14,756	1.58%	0	0	0
Unprojected delegates:			0	0	0
Total:	936,527	100.00%	95	0	95
Source: The Green Papers

==== Connecticut ====
Primary date: April 26, 2016
National delegates: 28

County results of the Connecticut Republican presidential primary, 2016. Donald Trump

Connecticut Republican primary, April 26, 2016
Candidate	Votes	Percentage	Actual delegate count		
Candidate	Votes	Percentage	Bound	Unbound	Total
Donald Trump	123,523	57.86%	28	0	28
John Kasich	60,522	28.35%	0	0	0
Ted Cruz	24,987	11.70%	0	0	0
Uncommitted	2,728	1.28%	0	0	0
Ben Carson (withdrawn)	1,733	0.81%	0	0	0
Unprojected delegates:			0	0	0
Total:	213,493	100.00%	28	0	28
Source: The Green Papers

==== Delaware ====
Primary date: April 26, 2016
National delegates: 16

County results of the Delaware Republican presidential primary, 2016. Donald Trump

Delaware Republican primary, April 26, 2016
Candidate	Votes	Percentage	Actual delegate count		
Candidate	Votes	Percentage	Bound	Unbound	Total
Donald Trump	42,472	60.77%	16	0	16
John Kasich	14,225	20.35%	0	0	0
Ted Cruz	11,110	15.90%	0	0	0
Ben Carson (withdrawn)	885	1.27%	0	0	0
Marco Rubio (withdrawn)	622	0.89%	0	0	0
Jeb Bush (withdrawn)	578	0.83%	0	0	0
Unprojected delegates:			0	0	0
Total:	69,892	100.00%	16	0	16
Source: The Green Papers

==== Maryland ====
Primary date: April 26, 2016
National delegates: 38

County results of the Maryland Republican presidential primary, 2016. Donald Trump

Maryland Republican primary, April 26, 2016
Candidate	Votes	Percentage	Actual delegate count		
Candidate	Votes	Percentage	Bound	Unbound	Total
Donald Trump	248,343	54.10%	38	0	38
John Kasich	106,614	23.22%	0	0	0
Ted Cruz	87,093	18.97%	0	0	0
Ben Carson (withdrawn)	5,946	1.30%	0	0	0
Marco Rubio (withdrawn)	3,201	0.70%	0	0	0
Jeb Bush (withdrawn)	2,770	0.60%	0	0	0
Rand Paul (withdrawn)	1,533	0.33%	0	0	0
Chris Christie (withdrawn)	1,239	0.27%	0	0	0
Carly Fiorina (withdrawn)	1,012	0.22%	0	0	0
Mike Huckabee (withdrawn)	837	0.18%	0	0	0
Rick Santorum (withdrawn)	478	0.10%	0	0	0
Unprojected delegates:			0	0	0
Total:	459,066	100.00%	38	0	38
Source: The Green Papers

==== Pennsylvania ====
Primary date: April 26, 2016
National delegates: 71

County results of the Pennsylvania Republican presidential primary, 2016. Donald Trump

Pennsylvania Republican primary, April 26, 2016
Candidate	Votes	Percentage	Actual delegate count		
Candidate	Votes	Percentage	Bound	Unbound	Total
Donald Trump	902,593	56.61%	17	42	59
Ted Cruz	345,506	21.67%	0	4	4
John Kasich	310,003	19.44%	0	3	3
Ben Carson (withdrawn)	14,842	0.93%	0	0	0
Marco Rubio (withdrawn)	11,954	0.75%	0	0	0
Jeb Bush (withdrawn)	9,577	0.60%	0	0	0
Unprojected delegates:			0	5	5
Total:	1,594,475	100.00%	17	54	71
Source: The Green Papers

==== Rhode Island ====
Primary date: April 26, 2016
National delegates: 19

County results of the Rhode Island Republican presidential primary, 2016. Donald Trump

Rhode Island Republican primary, April 26, 2016
Candidate	Votes	Percentage	Actual delegate count		
Candidate	Votes	Percentage	Bound	Unbound	Total
Donald Trump	39,221	63.7%	12	0	12
John Kasich	14,963	24.3%	5	0	5
Ted Cruz	6,416	10.4%	2	0	2
Uncommitted	417	0.7%	0	0	0
Marco Rubio (withdrawn)	382	0.6%	0	0	0
Write-in	215	0.3%	0	0	0
Unprojected delegates:			0	0	0
Total:	61,614	100.00%	19	0	19
Source: Rhode Island Board of Elections

=== May states ===
==== Indiana ====
Primary date: May 3, 2016
National delegates: 57

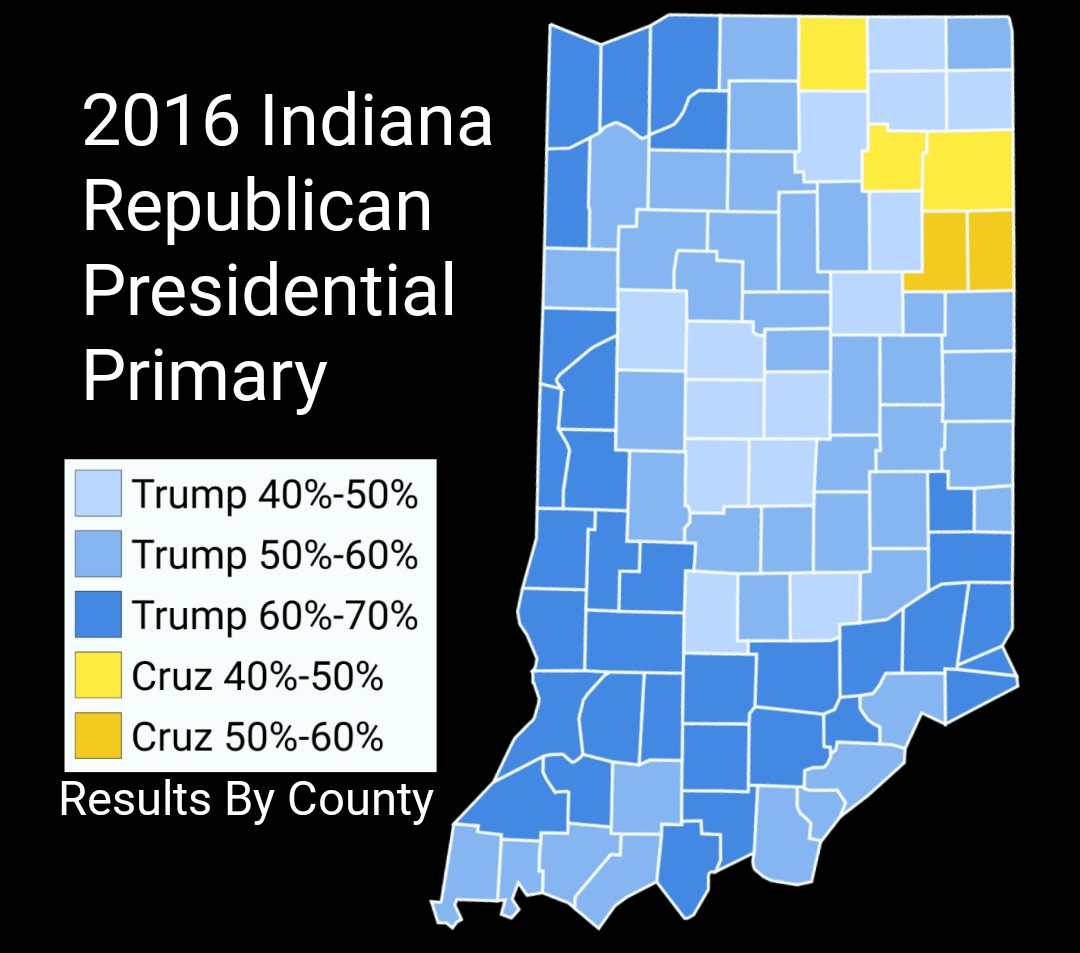
County results of the Indiana Republican presidential primary, 2016. Donald Trump Ted Cruz

Indiana Republican primary, May 3, 2016
Candidate	Votes	Percentage	Actual delegate count		
Candidate	Votes	Percentage	Bound	Unbound	Total
Donald Trump	591,514	53.26%	57	0	57
Ted Cruz	406,783	36.63%	0	0	0
John Kasich	84,111	7.57%	0	0	0
Ben Carson (withdrawn)	8,914	0.80%	0	0	0
Jeb Bush (withdrawn)	6,508	0.59%	0	0	0
Marco Rubio (withdrawn)	5,175	0.47%	0	0	0
Rand Paul (withdrawn)	4,306	0.39%	0	0	0
Chris Christie (withdrawn)	1,738	0.16%	0	0	0
Carly Fiorina (withdrawn)	1,494	0.13%	0	0	0
Unprojected delegates:			0	0	0
Total:	1,110,543	100.00%	57	0	57
Source: The Green Papers

==== Nebraska ====
Primary date: May 10, 2016
National delegates: 36

County results of the Nebraska Republican presidential primary, 2016. Donald Trump

Nebraska Republican primary, May 10, 2016
Candidate	Votes	Percentage	Actual delegate count		
Candidate	Votes	Percentage	Bound	Unbound	Total
Donald Trump	122,327	61.47%	36	0	36
Ted Cruz (withdrawn)	36,703	18.44%	0	0	0
John Kasich (withdrawn)	22,709	11.41%	0	0	0
Ben Carson (withdrawn)	10,016	5.03%	0	0	0
Marco Rubio (withdrawn)	7,233	3.63%	0	0	0
Unprojected delegates:			0	0	0
Total:	198,988	100.00%	36	0	36
Source: The Green Papers

==== West Virginia ====
Primary date: May 10, 2016
National delegates: 34

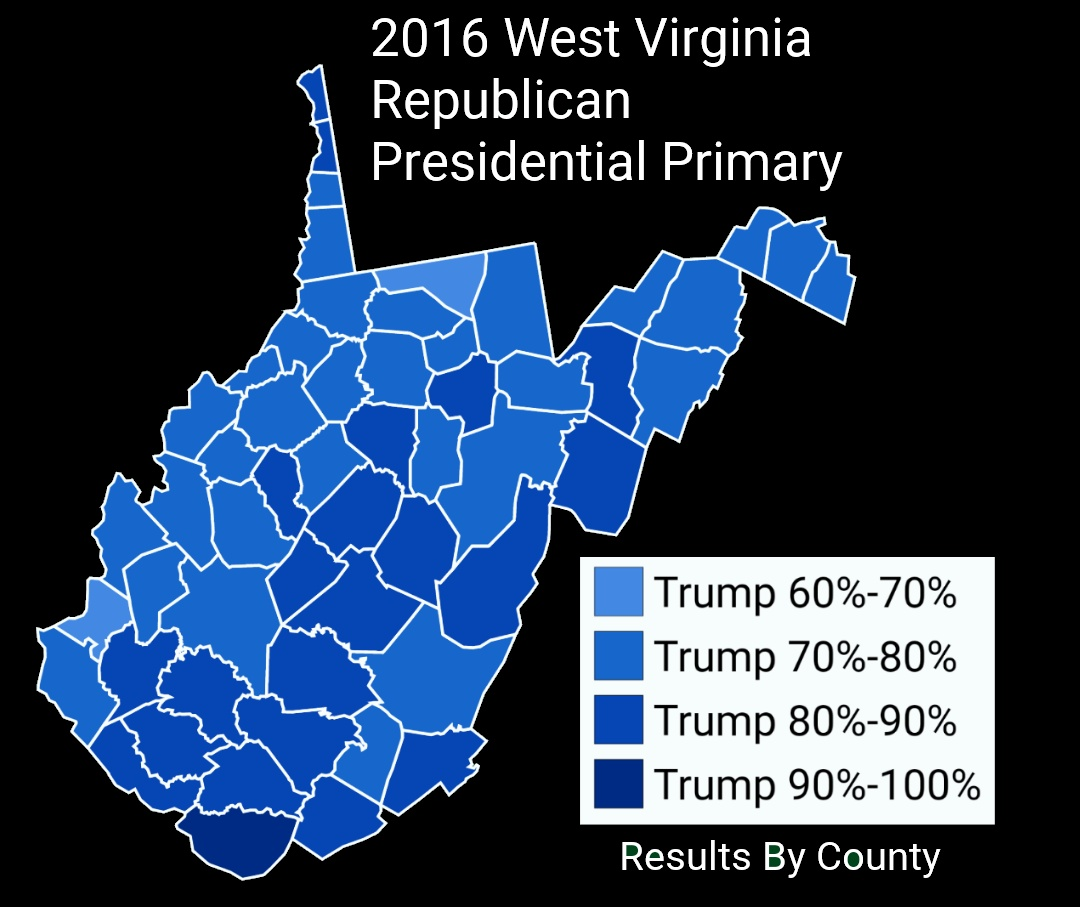
County results of the West Virginia Republican presidential primary, 2016. Donald Trump

West Virginia Republican primary, May 10, 2016
Candidate	Votes	Percentage	Actual delegate count		
Candidate	Votes	Percentage	Bound	Unbound	Total
Donald Trump	157,238	77.05%	30	0	30
Ted Cruz (withdrawn)	18,301	8.97%	0	0	0
John Kasich (withdrawn)	13,721	6.72%	1	0	1
Ben Carson (withdrawn)	4,421	2.17%	0	0	0
Marco Rubio (withdrawn)	2,908	1.43%	0	0	0
Jeb Bush (withdrawn)	2,305	1.13%	0	0	0
Rand Paul (withdrawn)	1,798	0.88%	0	0	0
Mike Huckabee (withdrawn)	1,780	0.87%	0	0	0
Chris Christie (withdrawn)	727	0.36%	0	0	0
Carly Fiorina (withdrawn)	659	0.32%	0	0	0
David Eames Hall	203	0.10%	0	0	0
Uncommitted			3	0	3
Unprojected delegates:			0	0	0
Total:	204,061	100.00%	34	0	34
Source: The Green Papers

==== Oregon ====
Primary date: May 17, 2016
National delegates: 28

County results of the Oregon Republican presidential primary, 2016. Donald Trump

Oregon Republican primary, May 17, 2016
Candidate	Votes	Percentage	Actual delegate count		
Candidate	Votes	Percentage	Bound	Unbound	Total
Donald Trump	252,748	64.16%	18	0	18
Ted Cruz (withdrawn)	65,513	16.63%	5	0	5
John Kasich (withdrawn)	62,248	15.80%	5	0	5
Write-in	13,411	3.40%	0	0	0
Unprojected delegates:			0	0	0
Total:	393,920	100.00%	28	0	28
Source: The Green Papers

==== Washington ====
Primary date: May 24, 2016
National delegates: 44

County results of the Washington Republican presidential primary, 2016. Donald Trump

Washington Republican primary, May 24, 2016
Candidate	Votes	Percentage	Actual delegate count		
Candidate	Votes	Percentage	Bound	Unbound	Total
Donald Trump	455,023	75.46%	41	0	41
Ted Cruz (withdrawn)	65,172	10.81%	0	0	0
John Kasich (withdrawn)	58,954	9.78%	0	0	0
Ben Carson (withdrawn)	23,849	3.96%	0	0	0
Uncommitted			3	0	3
Unprojected delegates:			0	0	0
Total:	602,998	100.00%	44	0	44
Source: The Green Papers

=== June states ===
==== California ====
Primary date: June 7, 2016
National delegates: 172

County results of the California Republican presidential primary, 2016. Donald Trump

California Republican primary, June 7, 2016
Candidate	Votes	Percentage	Actual delegate count		
Candidate	Votes	Percentage	Bound	Unbound	Total
Donald Trump	1,665,135	74.76%	172	0	172
John Kasich (withdrawn)	252,544	11.34%	0	0	0
Ted Cruz (withdrawn)	211,576	9.50%	0	0	0
Ben Carson (withdrawn)	82,259	3.69%	0	0	0
Jim Gilmore (withdrawn)	15,691	0.70%	0	0	0
Write-ins	101	0.00%	0	0	0
Unprojected delegates:			0	0	0
Total:	2,227,306	100.00%	172	0	172
Source: The Green Papers

==== Montana ====
Primary date: June 7, 2016
National delegates: 27

County results of the Montana Republican presidential primary, 2016. Donald Trump

Montana Republican primary, June 7, 2016
Candidate	Votes	Percentage	Actual delegate count		
Candidate	Votes	Percentage	Bound	Unbound	Total
Donald Trump	115,594	73.68%	27	0	27
Ted Cruz (withdrawn)	14,682	9.36%	0	0	0
John Kasich (withdrawn)	10,777	6.87%	0	0	0
No preference	7,369	4.70%	0	0	0
Marco Rubio (withdrawn)	5,192	3.31%	0	0	0
Jeb Bush (withdrawn)	3,274	2.09%	0	0	0
Unprojected delegates:			0	0	0
Total:	156,888	100.00%	27	0	27
Source: The Green Papers

==== New Jersey ====
Primary date: June 7, 2016
National delegates: 51

County results of the New Jersey Republican presidential primary, 2016. Donald Trump

New Jersey Republican primary, June 7, 2016
Candidate	Votes	Percentage	Actual delegate count		
Candidate	Votes	Percentage	Bound	Unbound	Total
Donald Trump	360,212	80.41%	51	0	51
John Kasich (withdrawn)	59,866	13.36%	0	0	0
Ted Cruz (withdrawn)	27,874	6.22%	0	0	0
Unprojected delegates:			0	0	0
Total:	447,952	100.00%	51	0	51
Source: The Green Papers

==== New Mexico ====
Primary date: June 7, 2016
National delegates: 24

County results of the New Mexico Republican presidential primary, 2016. Donald Trump

New Mexico Republican primary, June 7, 2016
Candidate	Votes	Percentage	Actual delegate count		
Candidate	Votes	Percentage	Bound	Unbound	Total
Donald Trump	73,908	70.64%	24	0	24
Ted Cruz (withdrawn)	13,925	13.31%	0	0	0
John Kasich (withdrawn)	7,925	7.57%	0	0	0
Ben Carson (withdrawn)	3,830	3.66%	0	0	0
Jeb Bush (withdrawn)	3,531	3.37%	0	0	0
Carly Fiorina (withdrawn)	1,508	1.44%	0	0	0
Unprojected delegates:			0	0	0
Total:	104,627	100.00%	24	0	24
Source: The Green Papers

==== South Dakota ====
Primary date: June 7, 2016
National delegates: 29

County results of the South Dakota Republican presidential primary, 2016. Donald Trump

South Dakota Republican primary, June 7, 2016
Candidate	Votes	Percentage	Actual delegate count		
Candidate	Votes	Percentage	Bound	Unbound	Total
Donald Trump	44,867	67.09%	29	0	29
Ted Cruz (withdrawn)	11,352	16.97%	0	0	0
John Kasich (withdrawn)	10,660	15.94%	0	0	0
Unprojected delegates:			0	0	0
Total:	66,879	100.00%	29	0	29
Source: The Green Papers

== Total votes and delegates by candidate ==
Candidates listed received at least 0.01% of the total vote:

Candidate	Total votes	Total delegates
Donald Trump	14,015,993 (44.95%)	1,457
Ted Cruz	7,822,100 (25.08%)	553
John Kasich	4,290,448 (13.76%)	160
Marco Rubio	3,515,576 (11.27%)	166
Ben Carson	857,039 (2.75%)	7
Jeb Bush	286,694 (0.92%)	4
Rand Paul	66,788 (0.21%)	2
Chris Christie	57,637 (0.18%)	0
Mike Huckabee	51,450 (0.16%)	1
Carly Fiorina	40,666 (0.13%)	1
Jim Gilmore	18,369 (0.06%)	0
Rick Santorum	16,627 (0.05%)	0
Lindsey Graham	5,666 (0.01%)	0
Elizabeth Gray	5,449 (0.01%)	0

== Gallery ==
Percentage of vote received by Trump by state or territory.

Percentage of vote received by Cruz by state or territory.

Percentage of vote received by Kasich by state or territory.

== See also ==
- 2016 Republican National Convention
- Democratic Party presidential primaries, 2016
- Nationwide opinion polling for the Republican Party 2016 presidential primaries
- Republican Party presidential candidates, 2016
- Republican Party presidential debates, 2016
- Republican Party presidential primaries, 2016
- Statewide opinion polling for the Republican Party presidential primaries, 2016
