= 2016 United States presidential election in the U.S. Virgin Islands =

United States presidential election in the U.S. Virgin Islands, 2016
- November 8, 2016
President before election
Barack Obama
Democratic
Elected President
Donald Trump
Republican

The U.S. Virgin Islands did not participate in the November 8, 2016 general election because it is a territory and not a state. However, the five non-incorporated territories that send Delegates to the House of Representatives did participate in the presidential primaries.

In presidential caucuses, Virgin Islands voters expressed their preferences for the Democratic and Republican parties' respective nominees for president. Registered members of each party only voted in their party's primary, while voters who were unaffiliated chose any one primary in which to vote.

== Caucuses ==
=== Republican caucuses ===
The Republican convention took place on March 10, 2016.

Six of Virgin Islands' nine Republican delegates were elected during a presidential caucus. Territorial Caucuses met from noon to 6 p.m. Atlantic Standard Time on St. Croix, St. Thomas, and St. John as a Convention to vote for Presidential Preference and select at-large delegates to the Republican National Convention.

Three party leaders—the National Committeeman, the National Committeewoman, and the chairman of the Virgin Islands's Republican Party—attended the convention by virtue of their position. On election day all six delegates were voted to be uncommitted to the national convention in Ohio. This means that they will decide who to support at the convention. All 6 delegates were disqualified by the territorial party and were replaced. Rubio received 2 delegates, 2 delegates were uncommitted, Ted Cruz received 1, and Donald Trump received 1. This decision is being contested.

Virgin Islands Republican territorial caucus, March 10, 2016
Candidate	Votes	Percentage	Actual delegate count		
Candidate	Votes	Percentage	Bound	Unbound	Total
Uncommitted	1,063	65.3%	1	0	0
Ted Cruz	191	11.7%	0	0	0
Marco Rubio	161	9.9%	0	0	0
Ben Carson (withdrawn)	108	6.6%	0	0	0
Donald Trump	104	6.4%	5	3	8
Unprojected delegates:			0	0	0
Total:	1,627	100.00%	6	3	9

=== Democratic caucuses ===
Seven of Virgin Islands' 12 Democratic delegates are pledged to presidential contenders based on the results of the voting in the Virgin Islands Territorial Convention. A mandatory 15 percent threshold is required in order for a presidential contender to be pledged National Convention delegates.

The At-Large delegates are to be pledged proportionally to presidential contenders based on the Caucus results on each of the three islands: four from St Thomas and St. John jointly, and three from St. Croix.

The Democratic Caucus took place on June 4, 2016.

U.S. Virgin Islands Democratic caucuses, June 4, 2016
Candidate	Popular vote		Estimated delegates		
Candidate	Count	Percentage	Pledged	Unpledged	Total
Hillary Clinton	1,326	87.12%	7	5	12
Bernie Sanders	196	12.88%	0	0	0
Uncommitted	—N/a		0	0	0
Total	1,514	100%	7	5	12

== See also ==
- Democratic Party presidential debates, 2016
- Democratic Party presidential primaries, 2016
- Republican Party presidential debates, 2016
- Republican Party presidential primaries, 2016
