= Rick Santorum 2016 presidential campaign =

American political campaign

Rick Santorum
- Campaign: 2016 Republican Party presidential primaries
- Candidate: Rick Santorum; U.S. Senator from Pennsylvania (1995–2007)
- Affiliation: Republican Party
- Status: Announced: May 27, 2015; Suspended: February 3, 2016
- Headquarters: P.O. Box 238; Verona, Pennsylvania
- Receipts: US$1,302,884 (2015-12-31)
- Slogan: Restore the American Dream for hardworking families

Website
- www.RickSantorum.com (archived - January 30, 2016)

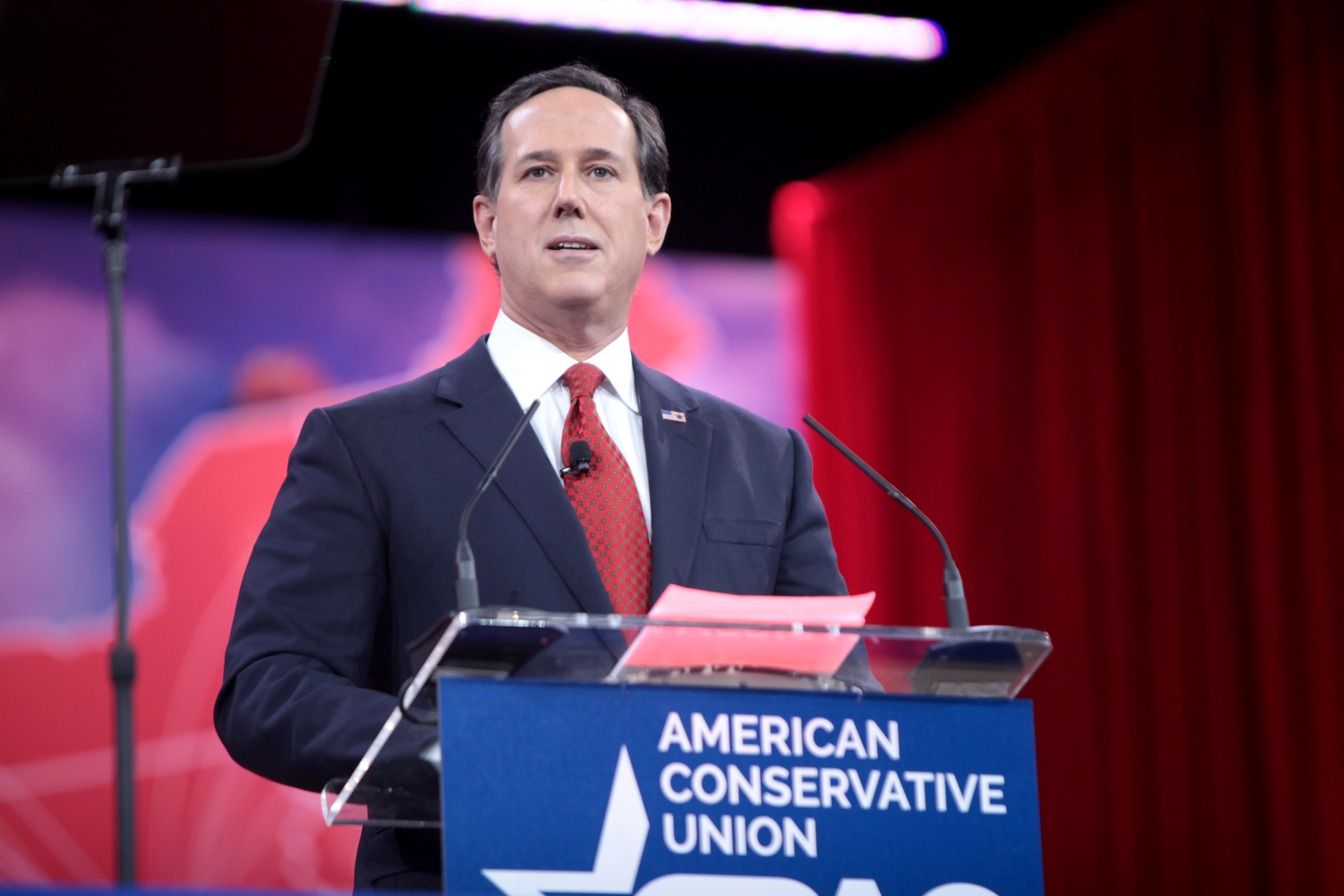
Santorum at CPAC in 2015

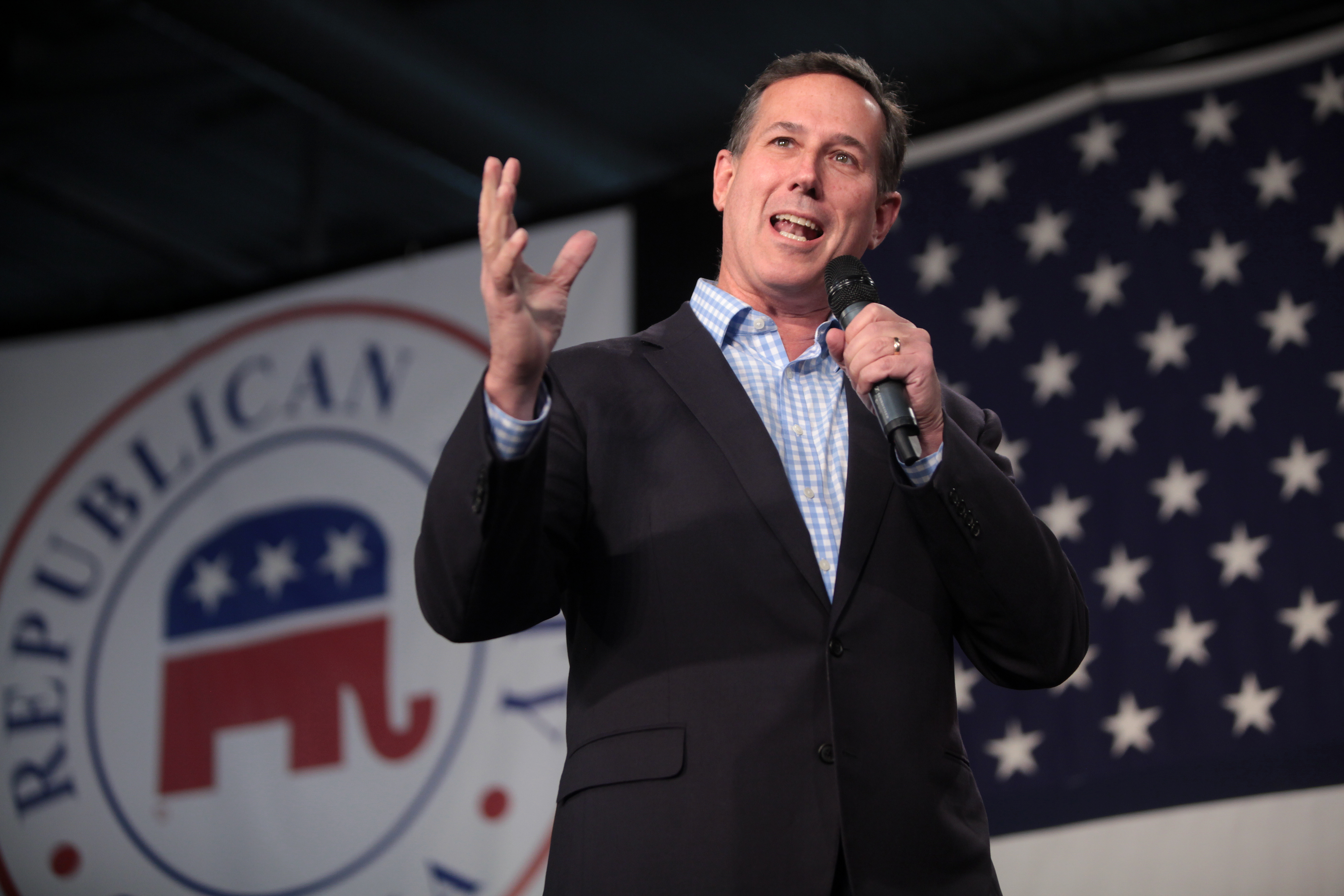
Santorum speaking at an event hosted by the Iowa Republican Party in October 2015.

The 2016 presidential campaign of Rick Santorum, former United States Senator from Pennsylvania, was formally announced at a rally in Pittsburgh on May 27, 2015. His campaign for the Republican nomination for President of the United States in 2016 was his second bid for the office, after having been a candidate in 2012, where he received the second most delegates after 2012 nominee Mitt Romney.

Santorum suspended his campaign on February 3, 2016, and endorsed Marco Rubio.

== Background ==
=== 2012 election ===
Santorum was a candidate for the Republican nomination in the 2012 election. He announced his campaign on Good Morning America on June 6, 2011. He won 11 contests and received 4 million votes, putting him in second place to nominee Mitt Romney. Facing a tough challenge by Romney, lagging poll numbers and the poor health of his daughter, Santorum announced the suspension of his campaign on April 10, 2012.

== 2016 campaign ==
Santorum was regarded as a potential candidate for the 2016 presidential election as early as the suspension of his 2012 campaign. A Los Angeles Times article about Santorum's 2012 campaign suspension mentioned that his strong second-place showing in that election would bolster any effort to get the nomination in 2016 or 2020. During an interview with Greta Van Susteren on Fox News on May 6, 2015, Santorum commented that he was the underdog in the 2012 election and that he would likely be the underdog again in the 2016 election, saying "We're very comfortable there." However, eight months in, Santorum failed to get his campaign going, with polling numbers dropping, and staying, below 1.0%. After a poor showing in the Iowa Caucuses, Santorum announced the suspension of his campaign on February 3, 2016, giving his endorsement to Marco Rubio. During an April 25, 2017 question and answer session, however, Santorum commented that Rubio and Cruz would have been inferior to Trump as party nominees.

=== Endorsements ===
Rick Santorum endorsements

U.S. Representatives (current)

- Pennsylvania: Lou Barletta

State legislators

- Iowa State Representative: Walt Rogers
- Two New Hampshire State Representatives: Glenn Cordelli, Kurt Wuelper
- Five Pennsylvania State Senators: Jake Corman (Majority Leader), Bob Mensch (Republican Caucus Chairman), Richard Alloway (Republican Caucus Secretary), Pat Browne (Appropriations Committee Chairman), Dave Argall (Republican Policy Committee Chairman)
- Seven Pennsylvania State Representatives: Mike Turzai (Speaker of the House), Dave L. Reed (Majority Leader), Bryan Cutler (Majority Whip), Sandra Major (Republican Caucus Chairman), Donna Oberlander (Republican Caucus Secretary), Brian Ellis (Republican Caucus Administrator), Kerry Benninghoff (Republican Policy Committee Chairman)

Businesspeople

- Foster Friess (investor)
