= Lindsey Graham 2016 presidential campaign =

American political campaign

Lindsey Graham for President
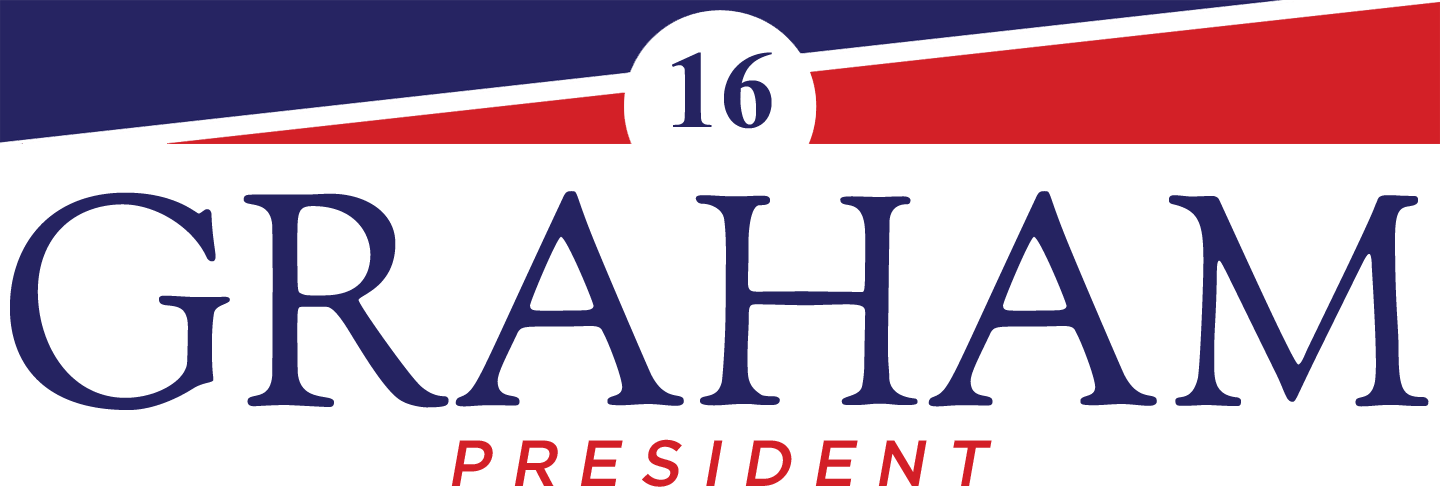
- Campaign: 2016 Republican presidential primary 2016 United States presidential election
- Candidate: Lindsey Graham; U.S. Senator from South Carolina (2003–2026); U.S. Representative from South Carolina (1995–2003)
- Affiliation: Republican Party
- Status: Announced: June 1, 2015; Suspended: December 21, 2015
- Headquarters: P.O. Box 2732; Columbia, South Carolina
- Receipts: US$5,628,709 (2015-12-31)
- Slogan: "Ready To Be Commander-in-Chief On Day One"

Website
- www.LindseyGraham.com (archived - December 18, 2015)

Lindsey Graham, the former senior United States senator from South Carolina and former U.S. Representative for South Carolina's 3rd congressional district, announced his bid for the Republican nomination for president on June 1, 2015, at an event in his hometown of Central, South Carolina. Although he was praised for solid, often humorous debate performances, the campaign never gained any traction, and was suspended on December 21, 2015.

If Graham, a bachelor, had secured the nomination he would have been the first unwed individual to receive a major-party nomination since unwed divorcee Adlai Stevenson II (the Democratic nominee in 1952 and 1956).

== Background ==
It had been speculated that Graham could be a potential presidential candidate since at least October 2014, when he had stated that he would explore running for president in the 2016 election if he were re-elected as a Senator in the 2014 election, and began appearing at events and discussing a potential Presidential bid. Graham was previously considered as a possible running mate for Republican presidential nominee John McCain in the 2008 presidential election, however former Alaska governor Sarah Palin was later chosen for the job.

In March 2015, at a Republican forum in New Hampshire, Graham advocated reversal of recent cuts in defense spending, and quipped: "If I were President of the United States, I wouldn't let Congress leave town until we fix this. I would literally use the military to keep them in if I had to."

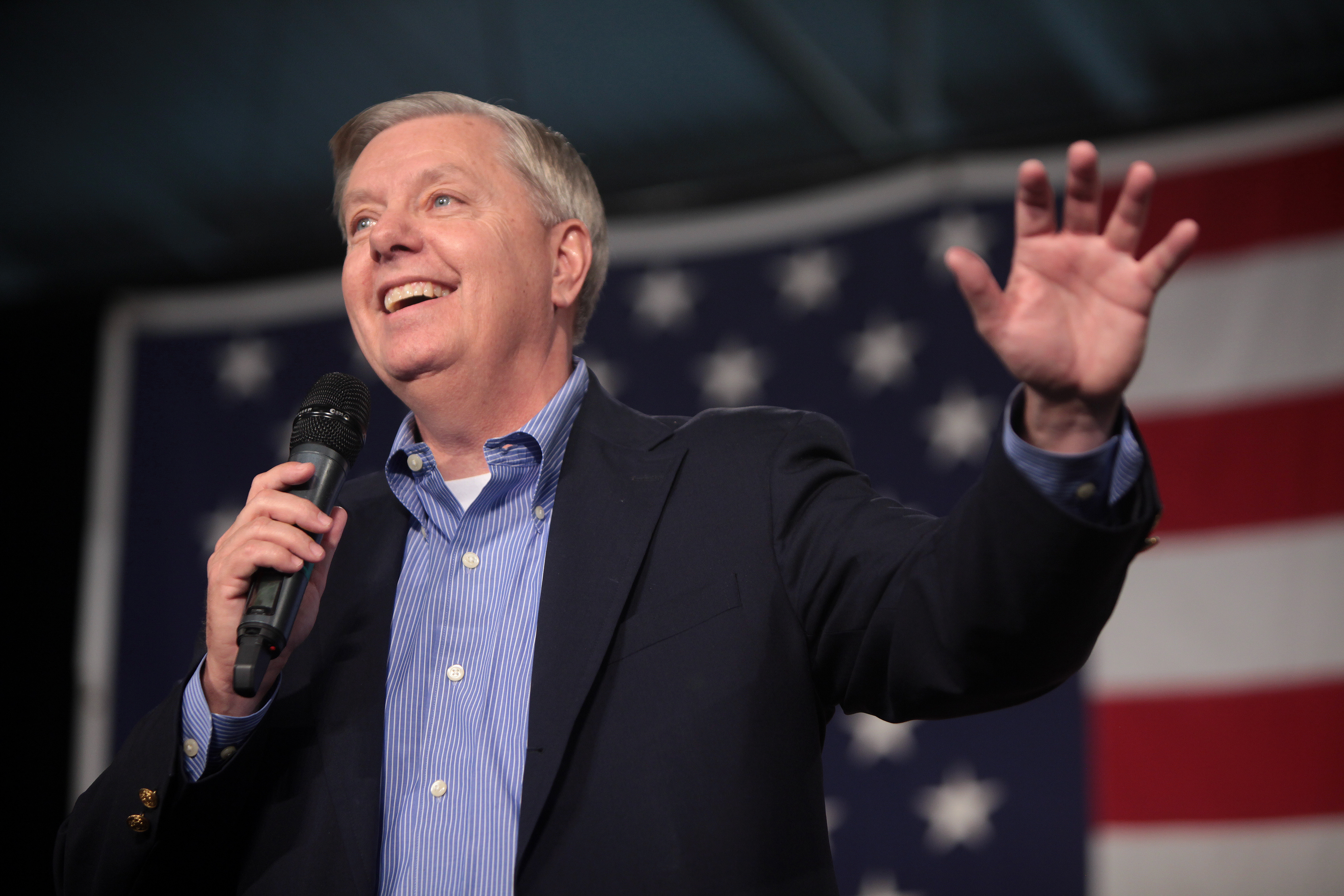
Graham speaking at an event hosted by the Iowa Republican Party in October 2015.

In April 2015, Graham told Chris Wallace, on the Fox News Sunday show, that he was "91% sure" he would run for president. "If I can raise the money, I'll do it," he said. On May 18, 2015, Graham informally announced that he would run for president on CBS This Morning, saying he was running because he thinks "the world is falling apart."

Graham made the official announcement of his candidacy for president on June 1, 2015, in his home town of Central, South Carolina.

On July 20, 2015, Graham called Donald Trump a "jackass" during an interview on CNN because he was offended that Trump had criticized John McCain. The next morning he called Trump a "jackass" again in an appearance on CBS This Morning. In response, Trump ridiculed Graham for asking him for help to get on Fox & Friends and gave out Graham's mobile phone number. Graham responded by releasing a video in which he destroyed his phone.

Graham failed to qualify for the CNN debate on August 6, 2015, but participated in the secondary debate. Similarly, he participated in the secondary debates on CNN (September 16) and CNBC (October 28). In October, Graham was still only polling around 1% and his candidacy was viewed as a long shot. In early November the super PAC Security is Strength purchased a $1 million ad buy in New Hampshire for early which touted Graham's hawkish foreign policy stances and military service.

On December 21, 2015, Graham suspended his campaign and, on January 15, 2016, endorsed former Florida Governor Jeb Bush. However, once Bush and Florida Senator Marco Rubio dropped out, Graham endorsed Texas Senator Ted Cruz on March 17. Graham's endorsement of Cruz was unenthusiastic, comparing the choice between Cruz and Trump "like being shot or poisoned." After Cruz announced he was suspending his campaign for the Republican presidential nomination on May 3, 2016, Graham said: "If we nominate Trump, we will get destroyed... and we will deserve it." On May 6, 2016, Graham announced he would not vote for either Donald Trump or Hillary Clinton, commenting: "I think Donald Trump is going to places where very few people have gone and I'm not going with him." He ended up choosing to write-in third-party candidate Evan McMullin.

== Endorsements ==
Lindsey Graham endorsements

U.S. Senators (current and former)

- John McCain, Arizona, also nominee in 2008 and ran in 2000
- Norm Coleman, Minnesota (former), "backing Graham from the outside"

U.S. Representatives (current and former)

- John Light Napier, former Representative from South Carolina

U.S. Ambassadors (former)

- David Wilkins, to Canada (2005–2009) and prominent South Carolina lawyer
- Robert V. Royall, to Tanzania (2001–2003)

Statewide officials

- Converse Chellis, former Treasurer of South Carolina

State legislators

- Iowa State Senator: Tim Kapucian
- New Hampshire State Senator: Gary Lambert (former)
- New Hampshire State Representative: Bing Judd (former)
- Four South Carolina State Representatives: Joyce Hearn (former), Skipper Perry (former), W. Douglas Smith (former Speaker Pro Tempore), Scott Talley (former)

Mayors and other municipal leaders

- South Carolina: Knox H. White (Mayor of Greenville)

Businesspeople

- Scott T. Ford, co-chair of campaign super PAC and prominent businessman (former CEO of Alltel)
- Jeff Immelt, CEO of General Electric
- Ronald Perelman, investor with estimated wealth of $14 billion as of 2012

== See also ==
- 2016 Republican Party presidential primaries
- 2016 Republican Party presidential candidates
