= Results of the 2016 Democratic Party presidential primaries =

Results of the Democratic Party presidential primaries

This article includes the entire 2016 Democratic Party presidential primary schedule in a format that includes result tabulation. Below are the vote totals for everyone that appeared on the ballot during the 2016 Democratic presidential primaries. Two candidates, Bernie Sanders and Hillary Clinton, appeared on all 57 ballots. Two others, Martin O'Malley and Rocky De La Fuente, appeared in over 30 states and six others appeared on between two and ten states. Nearly 20 appeared on only New Hampshire's ballot. As of June 8, Hillary Clinton was considered the presumptive nominee according to media organizations. On July 26, the second day of the Democratic National Convention, Clinton was confirmed the Democratic nominee for the 2016 United States presidential election.

== Overview ==

=== Major candidates ===
The following are the results of candidates that have won at least one state. These candidates are on the ballots for every state, territory, and federal district contest. The results of caucuses do not always have attached preference polls and attendance can be extremely limited. The unpledged delegate count may not always reflect the latest declared preferences. Results are collected by The New York Times. For explanations of the various types of primaries see primary elections in the United States.

Date	State/territory	Calculated delegates			Type (Note: Differences between types: Open: Anyone can participate regardless of their registered party affiliation.; Semi-open: Anyone can participate except registered Republicans.; Semi-closed: Only registered Democrats or undeclared can participate.; Closed: Only registered Democrats can participate.)	Popular vote or equivalent (Note: Differences between types: CD: 'Popular vote' tallies the county delegates.; LDD: 'Popular vote' tallies the legislative district delegates.; SCD: 'Popular vote' tallies the state convention delegates.; SDE: 'Popular vote' tallies the state delegate equivalents.)		Estimated delegates (Note: Pledged delegates are elected with the understanding that they will support a specific candidate. Unpledged delegates (superdelegates) are not required to voice support for a specific candidate.)								
Date	State/territory	Calculated delegates			Type	Clinton	Sanders	Clinton			Sanders			Available (Note: One Illinois superdelegate is still committed to O'Malley. Therefore, the total number of available delegates is one less than expected.)		
Date	State/territory	P	U	T	Type	Clinton	Sanders	P	U	T	P	U	T	P	U	T
Feb 1	Iowa	44	7	51	Semi-open caucus	700 SDE (49.8%)	697 SDE (49.6%)	23	6	29	21	0	21	0	1	1
Feb 9	New Hampshire	24	8	32	Semi-closed primary	95,355 (37.7%)	152,193 (60.1%)	9	6	15	15	1	16	0	1	1
Feb 20	Nevada	35	8	43	Closed caucus	6,316 CD (52.6%)	5,678 CD (47.3%)	20	7	27	15	1	16	0	0	0
Feb 27	South Carolina	53	6	59	Open primary	272,379 (73.4%)	96,498 (26.0%)	39	5	44	14	0	14	0	1	1
Mar 1	Alabama	53	7	60	Open primary	309,926 (77.8%)	76,401 (19.2%)	44	6	50	9	0	9	0	1	1
Mar 1	American Samoa	6	5	11	Closed caucus	162 (68.4%)	61 (25.7%)	4	4	8	2	1	3	0	0	0
Mar 1	Arkansas	32	5	37	Open primary	146,057 (66.1%)	66,236 (30.0%)	22	5	27	10	0	10	0	0	0
Mar 1	Colorado	66	12	78	Closed caucus	49,789 (40.3%)	72,846 (59.0%)	25	9	34	41	0	41	0	3	3
Mar 1	Georgia	102	15	117	Open primary	543,008 (71.3%)	214,332 (28.2%)	73	11	84	29	0	29	0	4	4
Mar 1	Massachusetts	91	24	115	Semi-closed primary	606,822 (49.7%)	589,803 (48.3%)	46	21	67	45	1	46	0	2	2
Mar 1	Minnesota	77	16	93	Open caucus	73,510 (38.4%)	118,135 (61.6%)	31	12	43	46	2	48	0	2	2
Mar 1	Oklahoma	38	4	42	Semi-closed primary	139,443 (41.5%)	174,228 (51.9%)	17	1	18	21	1	22	0	2	2
Mar 1	Tennessee	67	8	75	Open primary	245,930 (66.1%)	120,800 (32.5%)	44	8	52	23	0	23	0	0	0
Mar 1	Texas	222	29	251	Open primary	936,004 (65.2%)	476,547 (33.2%)	147	21	168	75	0	75	0	8	8
Mar 1	Vermont	16	10	26	Open primary	18,338 (13.6%)	115,900 (85.7%)	0	5	5	16	5	21	0	0	0
Mar 1	Virginia	95	13	108	Open primary	504,741 (64.3%)	276,370 (35.2%)	62	12	74	33	0	33	0	1	1
Mar 5	Kansas	33	4	37	Closed caucus	12,593 (32.3%)	26,450 (67.7%)	10	4	14	23	0	23	0	0	0
Mar 5	Louisiana	51	8	59	Closed primary	221,733 (71.1%)	72,276 (23.2%)	37	6	43	14	0	14	0	2	2
Mar 5	Nebraska	25	5	30	Closed caucus	14,340 (42.9%)	19,120 (57.1%)	10	3	13	15	1	16	0	1	1
Mar 6	Maine	25	5	30	Closed caucus	1,232 SCD (35.5%)	2,231 SCD (64.3%)	8	4	12	17	1	18	0	0	0
Mar 1–8	Democrats Abroad	13	4 (Note: There are 8 unpledged delegates from Democrats Abroad that each cast half a vote at the national convention.)	17	Closed primary	10,689 (30.9%)	23,779 (68.9%)	4	2½	6½	9	½	9½	0	1	1
Mar 8	Michigan	130	17	147	Open primary	581,775 (48.3%)	598,943 (49.7%)	63	13	76	67	0	67	0	4	4
Mar 8	Mississippi	36	5	41	Open primary	187,334 (82.5%)	37,748 (16.6%)	31	3	34	5	2	7	0	0	0
Mar 12	Northern Marianas	6	5	11	Closed caucus	102 (54.0%)	65 (34.4%)	4	5	9	2	0	2	0	0	0
Mar 15	Florida	214	32	246	Closed primary	1,101,414 (64.4%)	568,839 (33.3%)	141	24	165	73	2	75	0	6	6
Mar 15	Illinois	156	27	183	Open primary	1,039,555 (50.6%)	999,494 (48.6%)	79	24	103	77	1	78	0	1	1
Mar 15	Missouri	71	13	84	Open primary	312,285 (49.6%)	310,711 (49.4%)	36	11	47	35	0	35	0	2	2
Mar 15	North Carolina	107	14	121	Semi-closed primary	622,915 (54.5%)	467,018 (40.9%)	60	9	69	47	2	49	0	3	3
Mar 15	Ohio	143	17	160	Semi-open primary	696,681 (56.1%)	535,395 (43.1%)	81	16	97	62	1	63	0	0	0
Mar 22	Arizona	75	10	85	Closed primary	262,459 (56.3%)	192,962 (41.4%)	42	6	48	33	1	34	0	3	3
Mar 22	Idaho	23	4	27	Open caucus	5,065 (21.2%)	18,640 (78.0%)	5	1	6	18	2	20	0	1	1
Mar 22	Utah	33	4	37	Semi-open caucus	15,666 (20.3%)	61,333 (79.3%)	6	2	8	27	2	29	0	0	0
Mar 26	Alaska	16	4	20	Closed caucus	2,146 (20.2%)	8,447 (79.6%)	3	1	4	13	1	14	0	2	2
Mar 26	Hawaii	25	9	34	Semi-closed caucus	10,125 (30.0%)	23,530 (69.8%)	8	5	13	17	2	19	0	2	2
Mar 26	Washington	101	17	118	Open caucus	7,140 LDD (27.1%)	19,159 LDD (72.7%)	27	11	38	74	0	74	0	6	6
Apr 5	Wisconsin	86	10	96	Open primary	433,739 (43.1%)	570,192 (56.6%)	38	9	47	48	1	49	0	0	0
Apr 9	Wyoming	14	4	18	Closed caucus	124 SCD (44.3%)	156 SCD (55.7%)	7	4	11	7	0	7	0	0	0
Apr 19	New York	247	44	291	Closed primary	1,133,980 (57.5%)	820,256 (41.6%)	139	41	180	108	0	108	0	3	3
Apr 26	Connecticut	55	16	71	Closed primary	170,045 (51.8%)	152,379 (46.4%)	28	15	43	27	0	27	0	1	1
Apr 26	Delaware	21	11	32	Closed primary	55,954 (59.8%)	36,662 (39.2%)	12	11	23	9	0	9	0	0	0
Apr 26	Maryland	95	24	119	Closed primary	573,242 (62.5%)	309,990 (33.8%)	60	17	77	35	1	36	0	6	6
Apr 26	Pennsylvania	189	19	208	Closed primary	935,107 (55.6%)	731,881 (43.5%)	106	19	125	83	0	83	0	1	1
Apr 26	Rhode Island	24	9	33	Semi-closed primary	52,749 (43.1%)	66,993 (54.7%)	11	9	20	13	0	13	0	0	0
May 3	Indiana	83	9	92	Open primary	303,705 (47.5%)	335,074 (52.5%)	39	7	46	44	0	44	0	2	2
May 7	Guam	7	5	12	Closed caucus	777 (59.5%)	528 (40.5%)	4	5	9	3	0	3	0	0	0
May 10	Nebraska	—N/a			Closed primary	42,692 (53.1%)	37,744 (46.9%)	Non-binding primary with no delegates allocated.								
May 10	West Virginia	29	8	37	Semi-closed primary	86,914 (35.8%)	124,700 (51.4%)	11	6	17	18	2	20	0	0	0
May 17	Kentucky	55	5	60	Closed primary	212,534 (46.8%)	210,623 (46.3%)	28	2	30	27	0	27	0	3	3
May 17	Oregon	61	13	74	Closed primary	269,846 (42.1%)	360,829 (56.2%)	25	7	32	36	3	39	0	3	3
May 24	Washington	—N/a			Open primary (Note: Open to all voters excluding those who caucused with the Republicans on February 20.)	420,461 (52.4%)	382,293 (47.6%)	Non-binding primary with no delegates allocated.								
Jun 4	Virgin Islands	7	5	12	Closed caucus	1,326 (87.12%)	196 (12.88%)	7	5	12	0	0	0	0	0	0
Jun 5	Puerto Rico	60	7	67	Open primary	52,658 (59.7%)	33,368 (37.9%)	37	6	43	23	0	23	0	1	1
Jun 7	California	475	76	551	Semi-closed primary	2,745,302 (53.1%)	2,381,722 (46.0%)	254	66	320	221	0	221	0	10	10
Jun 7	Montana	21	6	27	Open primary	55,805 (44.2%)	65,156 (51.6%)	10	5	15	11	1	12	0	0	0
Jun 7	New Jersey	126	16	142	Semi-closed primary	566,247 (63.3%)	328,058 (36.7%)	79	12	91	47	2	49	0	2	2
Jun 7	New Mexico	34	9	43	Closed primary	111,334 (51.5%)	104,741 (48.5%)	18	9	27	16	0	16	0	0	0
Jun 7	North Dakota	18	5	23	Open caucus (Note: Open to all voters, though those who attend must state they will identify as a Democrat for the 2016 election.)	106 SCD (25.6%)	258 SCD (64.2%)	5	1	6	13	1	14	0	3	3
Jun 7	South Dakota	20	5	25	Semi-closed primary	27,047 (51.0%)	25,959 (49.0%)	10	2	12	10	0	10	0	3	3
Jun 14	District of Columbia	20	25	45	Closed primary	76,704 (78.0%)	20,361 (20.7%)	16	23	39	4	2	6	0	0	0
Total		4,051	712	4,763		16,847,084 (55.20%) (Note: Does not include popular vote totals from Iowa, Maine, Nevada, North Dakota, Washington, Wyoming, or non-binding primaries)	13,168,222 (43.14%)	2,205	570½	2,775½	1,846	43½	1,889½	0	97	97
Date	State/territory	P	U	T	Type	Clinton	Sanders	P	U	T	P	U	T	P	U	T
Date	State/territory	Calculated delegates			Type	Popular vote or equivalent		Clinton delegates			Sanders delegates			Available delegates		

== Detailed results ==
=== February ===
==== Iowa ====
- Precinct caucuses: February 1
- County conventions: March 12
- District conventions: April 30
- State convention: June 18

2016 Democratic Party's presidential nominating process in Iowa – Summary of results –
Candidate	State delegate equivalents		Estimated delegates		
Candidate	Count	Percentage	Pledged	Unpledged	Total
Hillary Clinton	700.47	49.84%	23	6	29
Bernie Sanders	696.92	49.59%	21	0	21
Martin O'Malley	7.63	0.54%	0	0	0
Uncommitted	0.46	0.03%	0	1	1
Total	1,405.48	100%	44	7	51

==== New Hampshire ====
New Hampshire Democratic primary, February 9, 2016
Candidate	Popular vote		Estimated delegates		
Candidate	Count	Of total	Pledged	Unpledged	Total
Bernie Sanders	152,193	60.14%	15	1	16
Hillary Clinton	95,355	37.68%	9	6	15
Martin O'Malley (withdrawn)	667	0.26%			
Vermin Supreme	268	0.11%			
David John Thistle	226	0.09%			
Graham Schwass	143	0.06%			
Steve Burke	108	0.04%			
Rocky De La Fuente	96	0.04%			
John Wolfe Jr.	54	0.02%			
Jon Adams	53	0.02%			
Lloyd Thomas Kelso	46	0.02%			
Keith Russell Judd	44	0.02%			
Eric Elbot	36	0.01%			
Star Locke	33	0.01%			
William D. French	29	0.01%			
Mark Stewart Greenstein	29	0.01%			
Edward T. O'Donnell	26	0.01%			
James Valentine	24	0.01%			
Robert Lovitt	22	0.01%			
Michael Steinberg	21	0.01%			
William H. McGaughey Jr.	19	0.01%			
Henry Hewes	18	0.01%			
Edward Sonnino	17	0.01%			
Steven Roy Lipscomb	15	0.01%			
Sam Sloan	15	0.01%			
Brock C. Hutton	14	0.01%			
Raymond Michael Moroz	8	0.00%			
Richard Lyons Weil	8	0.00%			
Write-ins (Note: The write-ins include 3,248 votes for these 11 Republican presidential candidates: Trump (1795), Kasich (438), Jeb Bush (263), Christie (216), Marco Rubio (203), Ted Cruz (162), Fiorina (99), Carson (52), Paul (12), Gilmore (6), Huckabee (2).)	3,475	1.37%			
Uncommitted	—N/a		0	1	1
Total	253,062	100%	24	8	32

==== Nevada ====
Nevada Democratic caucuses, February 20, 2016
Candidate	County delegates		Estimated delegates		
Candidate	Count	Percentage	Pledged	Unpledged	Total
Hillary Clinton	6,440	52.64%	20	4	24
Bernie Sanders	5,785	47.29%	15	1	16
Uncommitted	8	0.07%	0	3	3
Total	12,233	100%	35	8	43

==== South Carolina ====
South Carolina Democratic primary, February 27, 2016
Candidate	Popular vote		Estimated delegates		
Candidate	Count	Percentage	Pledged	Unpledged	Total
Hillary Clinton	272,379	73.44%	39	5	44
Bernie Sanders	96,498	26.02%	14	0	14
Willie Wilson	1,314	0.35%			
Martin O'Malley (withdrawn)	713	0.19%			
Uncommitted			0	1	1
Total votes	370,904	100%	53	6	59

=== Super Tuesday ===
==== Alabama ====
2016 Democratic Party's presidential nominating process in Alabama – Summary of results –
Candidate	Popular vote (March 1 primary)		Estimated delegates		
Candidate	Count	Percentage	Pledged	Unpledged	Total
Hillary Clinton (campaign)	309,928	77.84%	44	6	50
Bernie Sanders (campaign)	76,399	19.19%	9	0	9
Martin O'Malley (campaign) (withdrawn)	1,485	0.37%			
Rocky De La Fuente (campaign)	811	0.20%			
Uncommitted	9,534	2.39%	0	1	1
Total	398,157	100%	53	7	60

==== Arkansas ====
2016 Democratic Party's presidential nominating process in Arkansas – Summary of results –
Candidate	Popular vote		Estimated delegates		
Candidate	Count	Percentage	Pledged	Unpledged	Total
Hillary Clinton	146,057	66.08%	22	5	27
Bernie Sanders	66,236	29.97%	10	0	10
Martin O'Malley (withdrawn)	2,785	1.26%			
John Wolfe Jr.	2,556	1.16%			
James Valentine	1,702	0.77%			
Rocky De La Fuente	1,684	0.76%			
Total	221,020	100%	32	5	37

==== American Samoa ====
2016 Democratic Party's presidential nominating process in American Samoa – Summary of results –
Candidate	Popular vote		Estimated delegates		
Candidate	Count	Percentage	Pledged	Unpledged	Total
Hillary Clinton	162	68.4%	4	4	8
Bernie Sanders	61	25.7%	2	1	3
Rocky De La Fuente	14	5.9%			
Total	237	100%	6	5	11

==== Colorado ====
2016 Democratic Party's presidential nominating process in Colorado – Summary of results –
Candidate	Popular vote		Estimated delegates		
Candidate	Count	Percentage	Pledged	Unpledged	Total
Bernie Sanders	72,846	58.98%	41	0	41
Hillary Clinton	49,789	40.31%	25	9	34
Uncommitted	822	0.67%	0	3	3
Others	51	0.04%			
Total	123,508	100%	66	12	78

==== Georgia ====
2016 Democratic Party's presidential nominating process in Georgia – Summary of results –
Candidate	Popular vote		Estimated delegates		
Candidate	Count	Percentage	Pledged	Unpledged	Total
Hillary Clinton	545,674	71.30%	73	11	84
Bernie Sanders	215,797	28.20%	29	0	29
Martin O'Malley (withdrawn)	2,129	0.28%			
Michael Steinberg	1,766	0.23%			
Uncommitted	—N/a		0	4	4
Total	765,366	100%	102	15	117

==== Massachusetts ====
Results of the Massachusetts Democratic primary on March 1, 2016
Candidate	Popular vote		Estimated delegates		
Candidate	Count	Percentage	Pledged	Unpledged	Total
Hillary Clinton	606,822	49.73%	46	21	67
Bernie Sanders	589,803	48.33%	45	1	46
Martin O'Malley (withdrawn)	4,783	0.39%	0	0	0
Rocky De La Fuente	1,545	0.13%	0	0	0
No preference	8,090	0.66%	–	2	2
All others	4,927	0.40%	0	0	0
Blank votes	4,326	0.35%	–	–	–
Total	1,220,296	100%	91	24	115

==== Minnesota ====
Minnesota Democratic caucuses, March 1, 2016
Candidate	Popular vote		Estimated delegates		
Candidate	Count	Percentage	Pledged	Unpledged	Total
Bernie Sanders	126,229	61.69%	46	1	47
Hillary Clinton	78,381	38.31%	31	13	44
Uncommitted	—N/a		0	2	2
Total	204,610	100%	77	16	93

==== Oklahoma ====
Oklahoma Democratic primary, March 1, 2016
Candidate	Popular vote		Estimated delegates		
Candidate	Count	Percentage	Pledged	Unpledged	Total
Bernie Sanders	174,228	51.88%	21	1	22
Hillary Clinton	139,443	41.52%	17	1	18
Martin O'Malley (withdrawn)	7,672	2.28%			
Keith Judd	4,386	1.31%			
Michael Steinberg	4,171	1.24%			
Star Locke (withdrawn)	3,458	1.03%			
Rocky De La Fuente	2,485	0.74%			
Uncommitted	—N/a		0	2	2
Total	335,843	100%	38	4	42

==== Tennessee ====
Tennessee Democratic primary, March 1, 2016
Candidate	Popular vote		Estimated delegates		
Candidate	Count	Percentage	Pledged	Unpledged	Total
Hillary Clinton	245,930	66.07%	44	7	51
Bernie Sanders	120,800	32.45%	23	0	23
Martin O'Malley (withdrawn)	2,025	0.54%			
Uncommitted	3,467	0.93%	0	1	1
Total	372,222	100%	67	8	75

==== Texas ====
Texas Democratic primary, March 1, 2016
Candidate	Popular vote		Estimated delegates		
Candidate	Count	Percentage	Pledged	Unpledged	Total
Hillary Clinton	936,004	65.19%	147	21	168
Bernie Sanders	476,547	33.19%	75	0	75
Rocky De La Fuente	8,429	0.59%			
Martin O'Malley (withdrawn)	5,364	0.37%			
Willie Wilson	3,254	0.23%			
Keith Judd	2,569	0.18%			
Calvis L. Hawes	2,017	0.14%			
Star Locke	1,711	0.12%			
Uncommitted	—N/a		0	8	8
Total	1,435,895	100%	222	29	251

==== Virginia ====
Virginia Democratic primary, March 1, 2016
Candidate	Popular vote		Estimated delegates		
Candidate	Count	Percentage	Pledged	Unpledged	Total
Hillary Clinton	504,741	64.29%	62	13	75
Bernie Sanders	276,370	35.20%	33	0	33
Martin O'Malley (withdrawn)	3,930	0.50%			
Uncommitted	—N/a		0	1	1
Total	785,041	100%	95	14	109

==== Vermont ====
Vermont Democratic primary, March 1, 2016
Candidate	Popular vote		Estimated delegates		
Candidate	Count	Percentage	Pledged	Unpledged	Total
Bernie Sanders	115,900	85.69%	16	6	22
Hillary Clinton	18,338	13.56%	0	4	4
Martin O'Malley (withdrawn)	282	0.21%			
Roque "Rocky" De La Fuente	80	0.06%			
Total blank votes	260	0.19%			
Total write-ins	238	0.18%			
Total spoiled votes	158	0.12%			
Uncommitted	—N/a		0	0	0
Total	135,256	100%	16	10	26

=== Early March ===
==== Kansas ====
Kansas Democratic caucuses, March 5, 2016
Candidate	District delegates		Estimated delegates		
Candidate	Count	Percentage	Pledged	Unpledged	Total
Bernie Sanders	26,637	67.90%	23	0	23
Hillary Clinton	12,593	32.10%	10	4	14
Uncommitted	—N/a		0	0	0
Total	39,230	100%	33	4	37

==== Louisiana ====
Louisiana Democratic primary, March 5, 2016
Candidate	Popular vote		Estimated delegates		
Candidate	Count	Percentage	Pledged	Unpledged	Total
Hillary Clinton	221,733	71.12%	37	7	44
Bernie Sanders	72,276	23.18%	14	0	14
Steve Burke	4,785	1.53%			
John Wolfe Jr.	4,512	1.45%			
Martin O'Malley (withdrawn)	2,550	0.82%			
Willie Wilson	1,423	0.46%			
Keith Russell Judd	1,357	0.44%			
Rocky De La Fuente	1,341	0.43%			
Michael Steinberg	993	0.32%			
Henry Hewes	806	0.26%			
Uncommitted	—N/a		0	1	1
Total	311,776	100%	51	8	59

==== Nebraska ====
Democratic presidential caucuses

Nebraska Democratic caucuses, March 5, 2016
Candidate	Popular vote		Estimated delegates		
Candidate	Count	Percentage	Pledged	Unpledged	Total
Bernie Sanders	19,120	57.14%	15	1	16
Hillary Clinton	14,340	42.86%	10	3	13
Uncommitted	—N/a		0	1	1
Total	33,460	100%	25	5	30

Democratic presidential primary (non-binding)
The Nebraska Democratic primary was held on May 10, 2016. The primary does not bind delegates. Delegates were bound by the caucuses on March 5, 2016.

Nebraska Democratic primary, May 10, 2016
Candidate	Popular vote		Estimated delegates		
Candidate	Count	Percentage	Pledged	Unpledged	Total
Hillary Clinton	42,692	53.08%	—N/a		
Bernie Sanders	37,744	46.92%	—N/a		
Total	80,436	100%	—N/a		

==== Maine ====
Maine Democratic caucuses, March 6, 2016
Candidate	State convention delegates		Estimated delegates		
Candidate	Count	Percentage	Pledged	Unpledged	Total
Bernie Sanders	2,226	64.17%	17	1	18
Hillary Clinton	1,231	35.49%	8	4	12
Uncommitted	12	0.35%	0	0	0
Total	3,469	100%	25	5	30

==== Democrats Abroad ====
2016 Democratic Party's presidential nominating process for Democrats Abroad – Summary of results –
Candidate	Votes		Estimated delegates		
Candidate	Count	Percentage	Pledged	Unpledged × ½	Total
Bernie Sanders	23,779	68.79%	9	1/2	9 1/2
Hillary Clinton	10,689	30.92%	4	2 1/2	6 1/2
Martin O'Malley (withdrawn)	21	0.06%			
Rocky De La Fuente	6	0.02%			
Uncommitted	—N/a		0	1	1
Total		100%	13	4	17

==== Michigan ====
Michigan Democratic primary, March 8, 2016
Candidate	Popular vote		Estimated delegates		
Candidate	Count	Percentage	Pledged	Unpledged	Total
Bernie Sanders	598,943	49.68%	67	0	67
Hillary Clinton	581,775	48.26%	63	10	73
Uncommitted	21,601	1.79%	0	7	7
Martin O'Malley (withdrawn)	2,363	0.20%			
Rocky De La Fuente	870	0.07%			
Total	1,205,552	100%	130	17	147

==== Mississippi ====
Mississippi Democratic primary, March 8, 2016
Candidate	Popular vote		Estimated delegates		
Candidate	Count	Percentage	Pledged	Unpledged	Total
Hillary Clinton	187,334	82.47%	31	3	34
Bernie Sanders	37,748	16.62%	5	2	7
Willie Wilson	919	0.40%			
Martin O'Malley (withdrawn)	672	0.30%			
Rocky De La Fuente	481	0.21%			
Write-in	10	0.00%			
Total	227,164	100%	36	5	41

==== Northern Mariana Islands ====
Northern Marianas Democratic caucus, March 12, 2016
Candidate	Popular vote		Estimated delegates		
Candidate	Count	Percentage	Pledged	Unpledged	Total
Hillary Clinton	102	53.97%	4	1	5
Bernie Sanders	65	34.39%	2	0	2
Uncommitted	22	11.64%	0	4	4
Total	189	100%	6	5	11

=== Late March ===
==== Florida ====
2016 Democratic Party's presidential nominating process in Florida – Summary of results –
Candidate	Popular vote		Estimated delegates		
Candidate	Count	Percentage	Pledged	Unpledged	Total
Hillary Clinton	1,101,414	64.44%	141	24	165
Bernie Sanders	568,839	33.28%	73	2	75
Martin O'Malley (withdrawn)	38,930	2.28%			
Uncommitted	—N/a		0	6	6
Total	1,709,183	100%	214	32	246

==== Illinois ====
Illinois Democratic primary, March 15, 2016
Candidate	Popular vote		Estimated delegates		
Candidate	Count	Percentage	Pledged	Unpledged	Total
Hillary Clinton	1,039,555	50.56%	79	24	103
Bernie Sanders	999,494	48.61%	77	1	78
Willie Wilson	6,565	0.32%			
Martin O'Malley (withdrawn)	6,197	0.30%	0	1	1
Lawrence "Larry Joe" Cohen	2,407	0.12%			
Rocky De La Fuente	1,802	0.09%			
Others	27	0.00%			
Uncommitted	—N/a		0	1	1
Total	2,056,047	100%	156	27	183

==== Missouri ====
Missouri Democratic primary, March 15, 2016
Candidate	Popular vote		Estimated delegates		
Candidate	Count	Percentage	Pledged	Unpledged	Total
Hillary Clinton	312,285	49.61%	36	11	47
Bernie Sanders	310,711	49.36%	35	2	37
Henry Hewes	650	0.10%			
Martin O'Malley (withdrawn)	442	0.07%			
Jon Adams	433	0.07%			
Rocky De La Fuente	345	0.05%			
Willie Wilson	307	0.05%			
Keith Russell Judd	288	0.05%			
John Wolfe Jr.	247	0.04%			
Uncommitted	3,717	0.59%	0	0	0
Total	629,425	100%	71	13	84

==== North Carolina ====
North Carolina Democratic primary, March 15, 2016
Candidate	Popular vote		Estimated delegates		
Candidate	Count	Percentage	Pledged	Unpledged	Total
Hillary Clinton	622,915	54.50%	60	8	68
Bernie Sanders	467,018	40.86%	47	2	49
Martin O'Malley (withdrawn)	12,122	1.06%			
Rocky De La Fuente	3,376	0.30%			
No preference	37,485	3.28%			
Uncommitted	—N/a			3	3
Total	1,142,916	100%	107	13	120

==== Ohio ====
Ohio Democratic primary, March 15, 2016
Candidate	Popular vote		Estimated delegates		
Candidate	Count	Percentage	Pledged	Unpledged	Total
Hillary Clinton	696,681	56.12%	81	14	95
Bernie Sanders	535,395	43.13%	62	1	63
Rocky De La Fuente	9,402	0.76%			
Uncommitted	—N/a			2	2
Total	1,241,478	100%	143	17	160

==== Arizona ====
2016 Democratic Party's presidential nominating process in Arizona – Summary of results –
Candidate	Popular vote		Estimated delegates		
Candidate	Count	Percentage	Pledged	Unpledged	Total
Hillary Clinton	262,459	56.3%	42	6	48
Bernie Sanders	192,962	41.4%	33	1	34
Martin O'Malley (withdrawn)	3,877	0.8%			
Roque "Rocky" De La Fuente	2,797	0.6%			
Michael Steinberg	2,295	0.5%			
Henry Hewes	1,845	0.4%			
Uncommitted	—N/a			3	3
Total	466,235	100%	75	10	85

==== Idaho ====
2016 Democratic Party's presidential nominating process in Idaho – Summary of results –
Candidate	Popular vote		Estimated delegates		
Candidate	Count	Percentage	Pledged	Unpledged	Total
Bernie Sanders	18,640	78.04%	18	2	20
Hillary Clinton	5,065	21.21%	5	1	6
Rocky De La Fuente	4	0.02%			
Uncommitted	175	0.73%		1	1
Total	23,884	100%	23	4	27

==== Utah ====
Utah Democratic caucuses, March 22, 2016
Candidate	Popular vote		Estimated delegates		
Candidate	Count	Percentage	Pledged	Unpledged	Total
Bernie Sanders	62,992	79.21%	27	2	29
Hillary Clinton	16,166	20.33%	6	2	8
Others	34	0.04%			
Uncommitted	334	0.42%	0	0	0
Total	79,526	100%	33	4	37

==== Alaska ====
2016 Democratic Party's presidential nominating process in Alaska – Summary of results –
Candidate	Popular vote		District delegates		Estimated delegates		
Candidate	Count	Percentage	Count	Percentage	Pledged	Unpledged	Total
Bernie Sanders	8,447	79.61%	441	81.52%	13	1	14
Hillary Clinton	2,146	20.23%	100	18.48%	3	1	4
Rocky De La Fuente	1	<0.01%					
Uncommitted	16	0.15%			0	2	2
Total	10,610	100%	541	100%	16	4	20

==== Hawaii ====
2016 Democratic Party's presidential nominating process in Hawaii – Summary of results –
Candidate	Popular vote		Estimated delegates		
Candidate	Count	Percentage	Pledged	Unpledged	Total
Bernie Sanders	23,530	69.8%	17	2	19
Hillary Clinton	10,125	30.0%	8	5	13
Rocky De La Fuente	12	0.0%			
Martin O'Malley (withdrawn)	6	0.0%			
Uncommitted	43	0.1%	0	2	2
Total	33,716	100%	25	9	34

==== Washington ====
Washington Democratic caucuses, March 26, 2016
Candidate	District delegates		Estimated delegates		
Candidate	Count	Percentage	Pledged	Unpledged	Total
Bernie Sanders	19,159	72.72%	74	0	74
Hillary Clinton	7,140	27.10%	27	10	37
Others					
Uncommitted	46	0.18%	0	7	7
Total	26,345	100%	101	17	118

=== April ===
==== Wisconsin ====
Wisconsin Democratic primary, April 5, 2016
Candidate	Popular vote		Estimated delegates		
Candidate	Count	Percentage	Pledged	Unpledged	Total
Bernie Sanders	570,192	56.59%	48	1	49
Hillary Clinton	433,739	43.05%	38	9	47
Martin O'Malley (withdrawn)	1,732	0.17%			
Roque "Rocky" De La Fuente (write-in)	18	0.00%			
Scattering	431	0.04%			
Uncommitted	1,488	0.15%	0	0	0
Total	1,007,600	100%	86	10	96

==== Wyoming ====
Wyoming Democratic caucuses, April 9, 2016
Candidate	County delegates		Estimated national delegates		
Candidate	Count	Percentage	Pledged	Unpledged	Total
Bernie Sanders	156	55.7%	7	0	7
Hillary Clinton	124	44.3%	7	4	11
Uncommitted	—N/a		–	–	–
Total		100%	14	4	18

==== New York ====
New York Democratic primary, April 19, 2016
Candidate	Popular vote		Estimated delegates		
Candidate	Count	Percentage	Pledged	Unpledged	Total
Hillary Clinton	1,133,980	57.54%	139	41	180
Bernie Sanders	820,056	41.62%	108	0	108
Void	11,306	0.57%			
Blank votes	5,358	0.27%			
Uncommitted	—N/a		0	3	3
Total	1,970,900	100%	247	44	291

==== Connecticut ====
2016 Democratic Party's presidential nominating process in Connecticut – Summary of results –
Candidate	Popular vote		Estimated delegates		
Candidate	Count	Percentage	Pledged	Unpledged	Total
Hillary Clinton	170,045	51.80%	28	15	43
Bernie Sanders	152,379	46.42%	27	0	27
Roque "Rocky" De La Fuente	960	0.29%	0	0	0
Uncommitted	4,871	1.48%	0	1	1
Total	328,255	100%	55	16	71

==== Delaware ====
2016 Democratic Party's presidential nominating process in Delaware – Summary of results –
Candidate	Popular vote		Estimated delegates		
Candidate	Count	Percentage	Pledged	Unpledged	Total
Hillary Clinton	55,954	59.75%	12	11	23
Bernie Sanders	36,662	39.15%	9	0	9
Roque De La Fuente	1,024	1.09%			
Uncommitted	—N/a		0	0	0
Total	93,640	100%	21	11	32

==== Maryland ====
Maryland Democratic primary, April 26, 2016
Candidate	Popular vote		Estimated delegates		
Candidate	Count	Percentage	Pledged	Unpledged	Total
Hillary Clinton	573,242	62.53%	60	17	77
Bernie Sanders	309,990	33.81%	35	1	36
Rocky De La Fuente	3,582	0.39%	—N/a		
Uncommitted	29,949	3.27%	0	6	6
Total	916,763	100%	95	24	119

==== Pennsylvania ====
Pennsylvania Democratic primary, April 26, 2016
Candidate	Popular vote		Estimated delegates		
Candidate	Count	Percentage	Pledged	Unpledged	Total
Hillary Clinton	935,107	55.61%	106	20	126
Bernie Sanders	731,881	43.53%	83	0	83
Rocky De La Fuente	14,439	0.86%	0	0	0
Total	1,681,427	100%	189	20	209

==== Rhode Island ====
Rhode Island Democratic primary, April 26, 2016
Candidate	Popular vote		Estimated delegates		
Candidate	Count	Percentage	Pledged	Unpledged	Total
Bernie Sanders	66,993	54.71%	13	0	13
Hillary Clinton	52,749	43.08%	11	9	20
Mark Stewart	236	0.19%	0	0	0
Rocky De La Fuente	145	0.12%	0	0	0
Write-in	673	0.55%	0	0	0
Uncommitted	1,662	1.36%	0	0	0
Total	122,458	100%	24	9	33

=== May ===
==== Indiana ====
Indiana Democratic primary, May 3, 2016
Candidate	Popular vote		Estimated delegates		
Candidate	Count	Percentage	Pledged	Unpledged	Total
Bernie Sanders	335,074	52.46%	44	0	44
Hillary Clinton	303,705	47.54%	39	7	46
Uncommitted	—N/a		0	2	2
Total	638,779	100%	83	9	92

==== Guam ====
2016 Democratic Party's presidential nominating process in Guam – Summary of results –
Candidate	Popular vote		Estimated delegates		
Candidate	Count	Percentage	Pledged	Unpledged	Total
Hillary Clinton	777	59.5%	4	5	9
Bernie Sanders	528	40.5%	3	0	3
Uncommitted	—N/a		0	0	0
Total	1305	100%	7	5	12

==== West Virginia ====
West Virginia Democratic primary, May 10, 2016
Candidate	Popular vote		Delegates		
Candidate	Count	Percentage	Pledged	Unpledged	Total
Bernie Sanders	124,700	51.41%	18		18
Hillary Clinton	86,914	35.84%	11	8	19
Paul T. Farrell Jr.	21,694	8.94%			
Keith Judd	4,460	1.84%			
Martin O'Malley (withdrawn)	3,796	1.57%			
Rocky De La Fuente	975	0.40%			
Uncommitted	—N/a		0	0	0
Total	242,539	100%	29	8	37

==== Kentucky ====
Kentucky Democratic primary, May 17, 2016
Candidate	Popular vote		Estimated delegates		
Candidate	Count	Percentage	Pledged	Unpledged	Total
Hillary Clinton	212,534	46.76%	28	2	30
Bernie Sanders	210,623	46.33%	27	0	27
Martin O'Malley (withdrawn)	5,713	1.26%			
Roque "Rocky" De La Fuente	1,594	0.35%			
Uncommitted	24,104	5.30%	0	3	3
Total	454,568	100%	55	5	60

==== Oregon ====
Oregon Democratic primary, May 17, 2016
Candidate	Popular vote		Estimated delegates		
Candidate	Count	Percentage	Pledged	Unpledged	Total
Bernie Sanders	360,829	56.24%	36	3	39
Hillary Clinton	269,846	42.06%	25	7	32
Misc.	10,920	1.70%	0	0	0
(available)	—N/a		0	3	3
Total	641,595	100%	61	13	74

=== June ===
==== Virgin Islands ====
U.S. Virgin Islands Democratic caucuses, June 4, 2016
Candidate	Popular vote		Estimated delegates		
Candidate	Count	Percentage	Pledged	Unpledged	Total
Hillary Clinton	1,326	87.12%	7	5	12
Bernie Sanders	196	12.88%	0	0	0
Uncommitted	—N/a		0	0	0
Total	1,514	100%	7	5	12

==== Puerto Rico ====
Puerto Rico Democratic caucuses, June 5, 2016
Candidate	Popular vote		Estimated delegates		
Candidate	Count	Percentage	Pledged	Unpledged	Total
Hillary Clinton	52,658	59.74%	36	7	42
Bernie Sanders	33,368	37.85%	24	0	24
Rocky De La Fuente	300	0.35%			
Total	88,149	100%	60	7	67

==== California ====
2016 Democratic Party's presidential nominating process in California – Summary of results –
Candidate	Popular vote		Estimated delegates		
Candidate	Count	Percentage	Pledged	Unpledged	Total
Hillary Clinton	2,745,302	53.07%	254	66	320
Bernie Sanders	2,381,722	46.04%	221	0	221
Willie Wilson	12,014	0.23%			
Michael Steinberg	10,880	0.21%			
Rocky De La Fuente	8,453	0.16%			
Henry Hewes	7,743	0.15%			
Keith Judd	7,201	0.14%			
Write-in	23	0.00%			
Uncommitted	—N/a			10	10
Total	5,173,338	100%	475	76	551

==== Montana ====
Montana Democratic primary, June 7, 2016
Candidate	Popular vote		Estimated delegates		
Candidate	Count	Percentage	Pledged	Unpledged	Total
Bernie Sanders	65,156	51.56%	11	1	12
Hillary Clinton	55,805	44.16%	10	5	15
No preference	5,415	4.28%	0	0	0
Uncommitted	—N/a		0	0	0
Total	126,376	100%	21	6	27

==== New Jersey ====
New Jersey Democratic primary, June 7, 2016
Candidate	Popular vote		Estimated delegates		
Candidate	Count	Percentage	Pledged	Unpledged	Total
Hillary Clinton	566,247	63.32%	79	12	91
Bernie Sanders	328,058	36.68%	47	2	49
Uncommitted	—N/a		0	0	0
Total	894,305	100%	126	16	142

==== New Mexico ====
New Mexico Democratic primary, June 7, 2016
Candidate	Popular vote		Estimated delegates		
Candidate	Count	Percentage	Pledged	Unpledged	Total
Hillary Clinton	111,334	51.53%	18	9	27
Bernie Sanders	104,741	48.47%	16	0	16
Uncommitted	—N/a		0	0	0
Total	216,075	100%	34	9	43

==== North Dakota ====
North Dakota Democratic caucuses, June 7, 2016
Candidate	District delegates		State delegates		
Candidate	Count	Percentage	Pledged	Unpledged	Total
Bernie Sanders	253	64.21%	13	1	14
Hillary Clinton	101	25.63%	5	1	6
Uncommitted	40	10.15%	0	0	0
Total	394	100%	18	5	23

==== South Dakota ====
South Dakota Democratic primary, June 7, 2016
Candidate	Popular vote		Estimated delegates		
Candidate	Count	Percentage	Pledged	Unpledged	Total
Hillary Clinton	27,047	51.03%	10	2	12
Bernie Sanders	25,959	48.97%	10	0	10
Uncommitted	—N/a		0	3	3
Total	53,006	100%	20	5	25

==== District of Columbia ====
2016 Democratic Party's presidential nominating process in the District of Columbia – Summary of results –
Candidate	Popular vote		Estimated delegates		
Candidate	Count	Percentage	Pledged	Unpledged	Total
Hillary Clinton	76,704	77.95%	16	23	39
Bernie Sanders	20,361	20.69%	4	2	6
Roque "Rocky" De La Fuente	213	0.22%			
Under votes	611	0.62%			
Write-in	485	0.49%			
Over votes	24	0.02%			
Uncommitted	—N/a		0	0	0
Total	98,398	100%	20	25	45

== See also ==
- Results of the 2016 Republican Party presidential primaries
- 2016 Libertarian Party presidential primaries
