= 2016 Democratic Party presidential candidates =

Previous Democratic nominee
Barack Obama
Democratic nominee
Hillary Clinton

This article contains lists of candidates associated with the 2016 Democratic Party presidential primaries for the 2016 United States presidential election.

== Major candidates ==
Individuals included in this section had taken one or more of the following actions: formally announced their candidacy, or filed as a candidate with Federal Election Commission (FEC) (for other than exploratory purposes), and were included in at least five independent national polls.

Five of the major candidates were invited to participate in at least one Democratic Party-sanctioned debate: Lincoln Chafee, Hillary Clinton, Martin O'Malley, Bernie Sanders, and Jim Webb.

=== Nominee ===
Candidate	Most recent position	State	Announced	Candidacy	Estimated delegate votes	Contests won (Note: According to popular vote or pledged delegate count (not counting superdelegates); see below for detail.)
Hillary Rodham Clinton	67th U.S. Secretary of State (2009–13)	New York	April 12, 2015	(Campaign • Positions); FEC Filing	Pledged delegates 2205 / 4051 (54%)	34; AL, AR, AS, AZ, CA, CT, DE, DC, FL, GA, GU, IA, IL, KY, LA, MA, MD, MO, MP, MS, NC, NJ, NM, NV, NY, OH, PA, PR, SC, SD, (Note: Pledged delegates split evenly between Sanders and Clinton.); TN, TX, VA, VI
Hillary Rodham Clinton	67th U.S. Secretary of State (2009–13)	New York	April 12, 2015	(Campaign • Positions); FEC Filing	Superdelegate endorsements (Note: Detailed list of superdelegate endorsements); 570½ / 712 (80%)	34; AL, AR, AS, AZ, CA, CT, DE, DC, FL, GA, GU, IA, IL, KY, LA, MA, MD, MO, MP, MS, NC, NJ, NM, NV, NY, OH, PA, PR, SC, SD, TN, TX, VA, VI
Hillary Rodham Clinton	67th U.S. Secretary of State (2009–13)	New York	April 12, 2015	(Campaign • Positions); FEC Filing	Total convention votes 2,842 / 4763 (60%)	34; AL, AR, AS, AZ, CA, CT, DE, DC, FL, GA, GU, IA, IL, KY, LA, MA, MD, MO, MP, MS, NC, NJ, NM, NV, NY, OH, PA, PR, SC, SD, TN, TX, VA, VI

=== Candidates who won one or more contests ===
The following candidate won primaries and received delegates in most or all state primaries and caucuses.

Candidate	Most recent position	State	Announced	Candidacy	Estimated delegate votes	Contests won (Note: According to popular vote or pledged delegate count (not counting superdelegates); see below for detail.)
Bernie Sanders	U.S. Senator from Vermont (2007–present)	Vermont	May 26, 2015	(Campaign • Positions); FEC Filing	Pledged delegates 1846 / 4051 (46%)	23; AK, CO, DA, HI, ID, IN, KS, ME, MI, MN, MT, NE, (Note: Hillary Clinton won the non-binding Nebraska Democratic Primary.); NH, ND, OK, OR, RI, UT, VT, WA, (Note: Hillary Clinton won the non-binding Washington Democratic Primary.); WI, WV, WY
Bernie Sanders	U.S. Senator from Vermont (2007–present)	Vermont	May 26, 2015	(Campaign • Positions); FEC Filing	Superdelegate endorsements 43½ / 712 (6%)	23; AK, CO, DA, HI, ID, IN, KS, ME, MI, MN, MT, NE, NH, ND, OK, OR, RI, UT, VT, WA, WI, WV, WY
Bernie Sanders	U.S. Senator from Vermont (2007–present)	Vermont	May 26, 2015	(Campaign • Positions); FEC Filing	Total convention votes 1,865 / 4763 (39%)	23; AK, CO, DA, HI, ID, IN, KS, ME, MI, MN, MT, NE, NH, ND, OK, OR, RI, UT, VT, WA, WI, WV, WY

=== Major candidates who withdrew during the primaries ===
The following individual announced a major candidacy for president but withdrew at some point after the Iowa Caucuses.

Candidate	Most recent position	State	Announced	Withdrew	Candidacy	Popular vote	Delegates	Ref
Martin O'Malley	61st Governor of Maryland (2007–2015)	Maryland	May 30, 2015	February 1, 2016	(Campaign • Website); FEC Filing	110,423	Pledged delegates 0 / 4051 (0%)	
Martin O'Malley	61st Governor of Maryland (2007–2015)	Maryland	May 30, 2015	February 1, 2016	(Campaign • Website); FEC Filing	110,423	Superdelegate endorsements 1 / 712 (0%)	
Martin O'Malley	61st Governor of Maryland (2007–2015)	Maryland	May 30, 2015	February 1, 2016	(Campaign • Website); FEC Filing	110,423	Total convention votes 0 / 4763 (0%)	

=== Major candidates who withdrew before the primaries ===
The following individuals were recognized by the media as major candidates for president but withdrew from the race after the first debate. Some received write-in votes. They are listed alphabetically.

Candidate	Most recent position	State	Announced	Withdrew	Candidacy	Write-in votes	Ref
Lincoln Chafee	74th Governor of Rhode Island (2011–2015)	Rhode Island	June 3, 2015	October 23, 2015	(Campaign • Website); FEC filing	0	
Lawrence Lessig	Professor of Law at Harvard Law School (2009–present)	Massachusetts	September 6, 2015	November 2, 2015 (considered independent run)	(Campaign • Website); FEC filing	3	
Jim Webb	United States Senator from Virginia (2007–2013)	Virginia	July 2, 2015	October 20, 2015	(Campaign • Website); FEC filing Amended FEC filing (party changed to Independent)	4	

== Other candidates ==
=== On the ballot in multiple states ===
The following notable individuals were on the ballot in at least five states.

Candidate	Most recent position	State	Announced	Candidacy	Ballot status	Vote total	Ref
Rocky De La Fuente	Businessman	California	October 1, 2015	(Campaign • Website); FEC filing	AL, AK, AS, AZ, AR, CA, CO, CT, DA, DE, GU, HI, ID, IL, IA, KS, KY, LA, MD, MA, MI, MN, MS, MO, NE, NV, NH, NC, ND, OH, OK, OR, PA, PR, RI, TX, UT, VT, WV, WI, WY	67,366	
Willie Wilson	Businessman; 2015 Chicago mayoral candidate	Illinois	May 15, 2015	(Website); FEC Filing	CA, IL, LA, MO, SC, TX	25,796	
Keith Russell Judd	Candidate	Texas	August 16, 2014	FEC filing	CA, LA, MO, NH, OK, TX, WV	20,305	
Michael Alan Steinberg	Lawyer	Florida	November 19, 2013		AZ, CA, GA, LA, NH, OK	20,126	
John Wolfe Jr.	Attorney; Democratic Party nominee for U.S. House of Representatives for Tennessee's 3rd congressional district, 2002, 2004, 2010	Tennessee	November 9, 2015		AR, CA, NH, LA, MO	7,352	

In addition, the following other candidates were on the ballot in more than one state:

- Star Locke of Texas, on the ballot in New Hampshire, Texas, and Oklahoma. received a total of 5,201 votes.
- Steve Burke of New York, on the ballot in New Hampshire and Louisiana, received 4,892 votes.
- Henry Hewes of New York, on the ballot in Louisiana, New Hampshire, Arizona, and Missouri, received 3,319 votes.
- Jon Adams of New York is on the ballot in Missouri and New Hampshire, received 486 votes.
- James Valentine of Miami Beach, Florida, on the ballot in both Arkansas and New Hampshire, received 1,710 votes.
- Mark Stewart Greenstein of Connecticut was on the ballot in New Hampshire and Utah. He received 41 votes.

=== On ballot in a single state ===
Illinois

- Lawrence "Larry Joe" Cohen of Illinois (2,407 votes)
- David Formhals of Illinois (25 votes)
- Brian James O'Neill of Illinois (2 votes)

Sources: Illinois Democrat and Candidates from The Green Papers

New Hampshire

- Vermin Supreme of Maryland; performance artist and perennial candidate (265 votes)
- David John Thistle of New Hampshire (223 votes)
- Graham Schwass of Massachusetts (142 votes)
- Lloyd Kelso of North Carolina (46 votes)
- Eric Elbot of Massachusetts (36 votes)
- William D. French of Pennsylvania (29 votes)
- Raymond Michael Moroz of New York (27 votes)
- Edward T. O’Donnell, Jr. of Pennsylvania (26 votes)
- Robert Lovitt of Kentucky (21 votes)
- William H. McGaughey, Jr. of Minnesota (19 votes)
- Edward Sonnino of New York (17 votes)
- Sam Sloan of New York; former chess administrator and 2012 Libertarian Party candidate (15 votes)
- Brock C. Hutton of Maryland (14 votes)
- Steven Roy Lipscomb of New Mexico (14 votes)
- Richard Lyons Weil of Colorado (8 votes)

Source: New Hampshire Democrat and Candidates from The Green Papers

Rhode Island

- Mark Stewart of New Hampshire (236 votes)

Source: Rhode Island Democrat and Candidates from The Green Papers

Texas

- Calvis L. Hawes of Texas (2,017 votes)

Source: Texas Democrat and Candidates from The Green Papers

West Virginia

- Paul T. Farrell Jr. of West Virginia; an attorney (21,694 votes)

Source: West Virginia Democrat and Candidates from The Green Papers

=== Candidates not on any primary ballot ===
Over a thousand people sent the requisite paperwork to the Federal Election Commission declaring themselves candidates for President.

Among them were the following notable people:

Name	Born	Current/previous positions	State	Announced	Candidacy	Ref
Jeff Boss	May 20, 1963; New York City, New York	Perennial candidate 9/11 Truther	New Jersey	August 18, 2014	(Website); FEC Filing	
Harry Braun	November 6, 1948; Compton, California	Energy consultant	Georgia	May 28, 2015	(Website); FEC Filing	
David Mills	January 24, 1959	Author	West Virginia	May 7, 2015	FEC Filing	
Robby Wells	April 10, 1968; Bartow, Georgia	Fmr. head football coach, Savannah State University	North Carolina	October 7, 2013	(Website); FEC Filing	

== Alternate ballot options ==
Several primaries provided ballot options to voters to cast votes for "no preference" and/or "uncommitted". "No preference" received 45,331 votes (0.27% of the popular vote), and 'uncommitted' received 40,548 votes (0.24% of the popular vote), respectively placing them 4th and 5th in the popular vote.

== Potential candidates who did not run ==
=== Speculated ===
The following people were the focus of presidential speculation in multiple media reports during the 2016 election cycle.

- Mike Beebe, Governor of Arkansas 2007–2015; Attorney General of Arkansas 2003–2007
- Steve Beshear, Governor of Kentucky 2007–2015; Lieutenant Governor of Kentucky 1983–1987; Attorney General of Kentucky 1980–1983
- Jerry Brown, Governor of California 2011–2019 and 1975–1983; presidential candidate in 1976, 1980, and 1992
- Steve Bullock, Governor of Montana 2013-2021; Attorney General of Montana 2009–2013
- Russ Feingold, nominee for U.S. Senate in 2016; U.S. Special Representative for the African Great Lakes region 2013–2015; U.S. Senator from Wisconsin 1993–2011
- Al Gore, Vice President of the United States 1993–2001; Democratic Party presidential nominee in 2000; U.S. Senator from Tennessee 1985–1993
- Christine Gregoire, Governor of Washington 2005–2013; Attorney General of Washington 1993–2005
- Luis Gutiérrez, U.S. Representative from Illinois 1993–2019; Member of the Chicago City Council 1986–1992
- Kamala Harris, nominee for U.S. Senate in 2016, Attorney General of California 2011–2017
- Maggie Hassan, nominee for U.S. Senate in 2016, Governor of New Hampshire 2013–2017
- Gary Locke, United States Ambassador to China 2011–2014; United States Secretary of Commerce 2009–2011; Governor of Washington 1997–2005
- Jack Markell, Governor of Delaware 2009–2017; Treasurer of Delaware 1993–2009
- William H. McRaven, retired Admiral and former Commander of the United States Special Operations Command
- Janet Napolitano, President of the University of California since 2013; U.S. Secretary of Homeland Security 2009–2013; Governor of Arizona 2003–2009
- Jay Nixon, Governor of Missouri 2009–2017; Attorney General of Missouri 1993–2009
- George Noory, radio talk show host
- Ed Rendell, Governor of Pennsylvania 2003–2011; Mayor of Philadelphia 1992–2000
- Kathleen Sebelius, United States Secretary of Health and Human Services 2009–2014; Governor of Kansas 2003–2009
- Paul Strauss, Shadow Senator from the District of Columbia since 1997
- Antonio Villaraigosa, Mayor of Los Angeles 2005–2013
- Tom Wolf, Governor of Pennsylvania 2015-2023; Secretary of Revenue of Pennsylvania 2007–2008

=== Declined ===
Individuals listed in this section were the focus of media speculation as being possible 2016 presidential candidates but publicly, and unequivocally, ruled out a presidential bid in 2016.

- Tammy Baldwin, U.S. Senator from Wisconsin since 2013; U.S. Representative from Wisconsin 1999–2013
- Evan Bayh, U.S. Senator from Indiana 1999–2011; Governor of Indiana 1989–1997 (endorsed Hillary Clinton)
- Michael Bennet, U.S. Senator from Colorado since 2009; Superintendent of Denver Public Schools 2005–2009 (endorsed Hillary Clinton)
- Joe Biden, Vice President of the United States 2009–2017, U.S. Senator from Delaware 1973–2009; Democratic presidential candidate in 1988 and 2008 (endorsed Hillary Clinton)
- Michael Bloomberg, former Mayor of New York City (2002–2013) and founder of Bloomberg L.P.
- Cory Booker, U.S. Senator from New Jersey since 2013, Mayor of Newark, New Jersey 2006–2013 (endorsed Hillary Clinton)
- Sherrod Brown, U.S. Senator from Ohio 2007-2025; U.S. Representative from Ohio 1993–2007; Secretary of State of Ohio 1983–1991 (endorsed Hillary Clinton)
- Joaquín Castro, U.S. Representative from Texas since 2013 (endorsed Hillary Clinton)
- Julian Castro, United States Secretary of Housing and Urban Development 2014–2017; Mayor of San Antonio, Texas 2009–2014
- George Clooney, actor and filmmaker from California
- Andrew Cuomo, Governor of New York 2011–2021; Attorney General of New York 2007–2010; U.S. Secretary of Housing and Urban Development 1997–2001
- Bill de Blasio, Mayor of New York City 2014–2021; New York City Public Advocate 2010–2013; New York City Councilman 2002–2009 (endorsed Hillary Clinton)
- Howard Dean, Chairman of the Democratic National Committee 2005–2009; Governor of Vermont 1991–2003; presidential candidate in 2004 (endorsed Hillary Clinton)
- Rahm Emanuel, Mayor of Chicago 2011–2019; White House Chief of Staff 2009–2010; U.S. Representative from Illinois 2003–2009 (endorsed Hillary Clinton)
- Al Franken, U.S. Senator from Minnesota 2009–2018 (endorsed Hillary Clinton)
- Kirsten Gillibrand, U.S. Senator from New York since 2009; U.S. Representative from New York 2007–2009 (endorsed Hillary Clinton)
- Martin Heinrich, U.S. Senator from New Mexico since 2013; U.S. Representative from New Mexico 2009–2013 (endorsed Hillary Clinton)
- John Hickenlooper, Governor of Colorado 2011–2019; Mayor of Denver, Colorado 2003–2011
- Tim Kaine, U.S. Senator from Virginia since 2013; Governor of Virginia 2006–2010 (endorsed Hillary Clinton and eventual vice presidential nominee)
- John Kerry, United States Secretary of State 2013–2017; U.S. Senator from Massachusetts 1985–2013; presidential nominee in 2004
- Amy Klobuchar, U.S. Senator from Minnesota since 2007 (endorsed Hillary Clinton)
- Dennis Kucinich, U.S. Representative from Ohio 1997–2013; presidential candidate in 2004, and 2008; Mayor of Cleveland, Ohio 1977–1979
- Dannel Malloy, Governor of Connecticut 2011–2019; Mayor of Stamford 1995–2011
- Joe Manchin, U.S. Senator from West Virginia since 2010, Governor of West Virginia 2005–2010 (endorsed Hillary Clinton)
- Claire McCaskill, U.S. Senator from Missouri 2007–2019; Auditor of Missouri 1999–2007 (endorsed Hillary Clinton)
- Chris Murphy, U.S. Senator from Connecticut since 2013; U.S. Representative from Connecticut 2007–2013 (endorsed Hillary Clinton)
- Michelle Obama, First Lady of the United States 2009–2017
- Deval Patrick, Governor of Massachusetts 2007–2015
- Kasim Reed, Mayor of Atlanta, Georgia 2010–2018
- Robert Reich, United States Secretary of Labor 1993–1997 (endorsed Bernie Sanders)
- Howard Schultz, Chairman and CEO of Starbucks 1988–2018
- Brian Schweitzer, Governor of Montana 2005–2013 (endorsed Martin O'Malley)
- Jeanne Shaheen, U.S. Senator from New Hampshire since 2009; Governor of New Hampshire 1997–2003 (endorsed Hillary Clinton)
- Mark Warner, U.S. Senator from Virginia since 2009; Governor of Virginia 2002–2006 (endorsed Hillary Clinton)
- Elizabeth Warren, U.S. Senator from Massachusetts since 2013; Special Advisor to the President 2010–2011

== See also ==
- Political positions of the Democratic Party presidential primary candidates, 2016
- 2016 United States presidential election timeline
- 2016 Democratic National Convention

Candidates

- Republican Party presidential candidates, 2016
- United States third party and independent presidential candidates, 2016

Primaries

- Democratic Party presidential primaries, 2016
- Republican Party presidential primaries, 2016

General election polling

- Nationwide opinion polling for the United States presidential election, 2016
- Statewide opinion polling for the United States presidential election, 2016

Democratic primary polling

- Statewide opinion polling for the Democratic Party presidential primaries, 2016
- Nationwide opinion polling for the Democratic Party 2016 presidential primaries
- Democratic Party presidential debates, 2016

Republican primary polling

- Statewide opinion polling for the Republican Party presidential primaries, 2016
- Nationwide opinion polling for the Republican Party 2016 presidential primaries
- Republican Party presidential debates, 2016
