= Rocky De La Fuente 2016 presidential campaign =

Third-party campaign for President of the United States

Rocky 2016 LLC
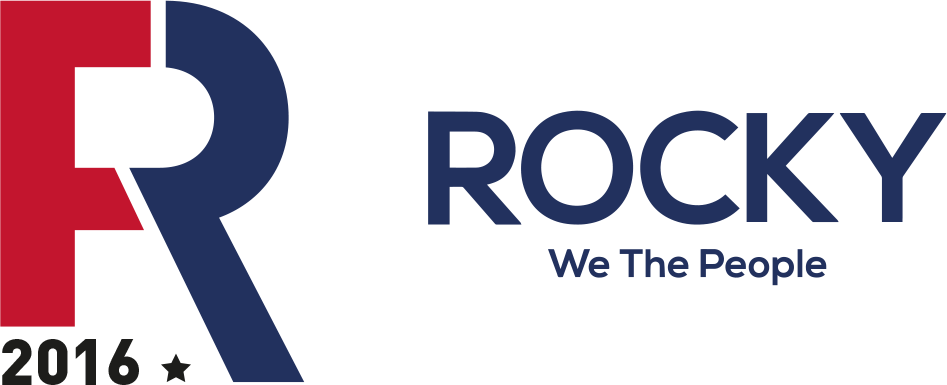
- Campaign: 2016 United States presidential election
- Candidate: Rocky De La Fuente
- Affiliation: Democratic Party; American Delta Party; Reform Party
- Status: Lost election: November 8, 2016
- Headquarters: San Diego, California
- Key people: Seven Wendroff (campaign treasurer)
- Receipts: US$7,351,270 (9/30/2016)
- Slogan: We The People

Website
- rocky2016.com (archived - November 7, 2016)

Rocky De La Fuente ran a third-party campaign for the presidency of the United States in the 2016 election. He had sought the Democratic Party's nomination during their presidential primaries. De La Fuente did not win any delegates to the 2016 Democratic National Convention, but he came in fourth by total votes received. He founded the American Delta Party and ran as its presidential nominee with running mate Michael Steinberg. He was also the presidential nominee of the Reform Party, which had ballot access in Florida, Louisiana, and Mississippi. He received 33,136 votes in the general election, placing him eighth in the popular vote.

== Democratic primary campaign ==
Map representing the ballot access of De La Fuente's Democratic Primary campaign On primary ballot On caucus ballot Write-in Not on ballot

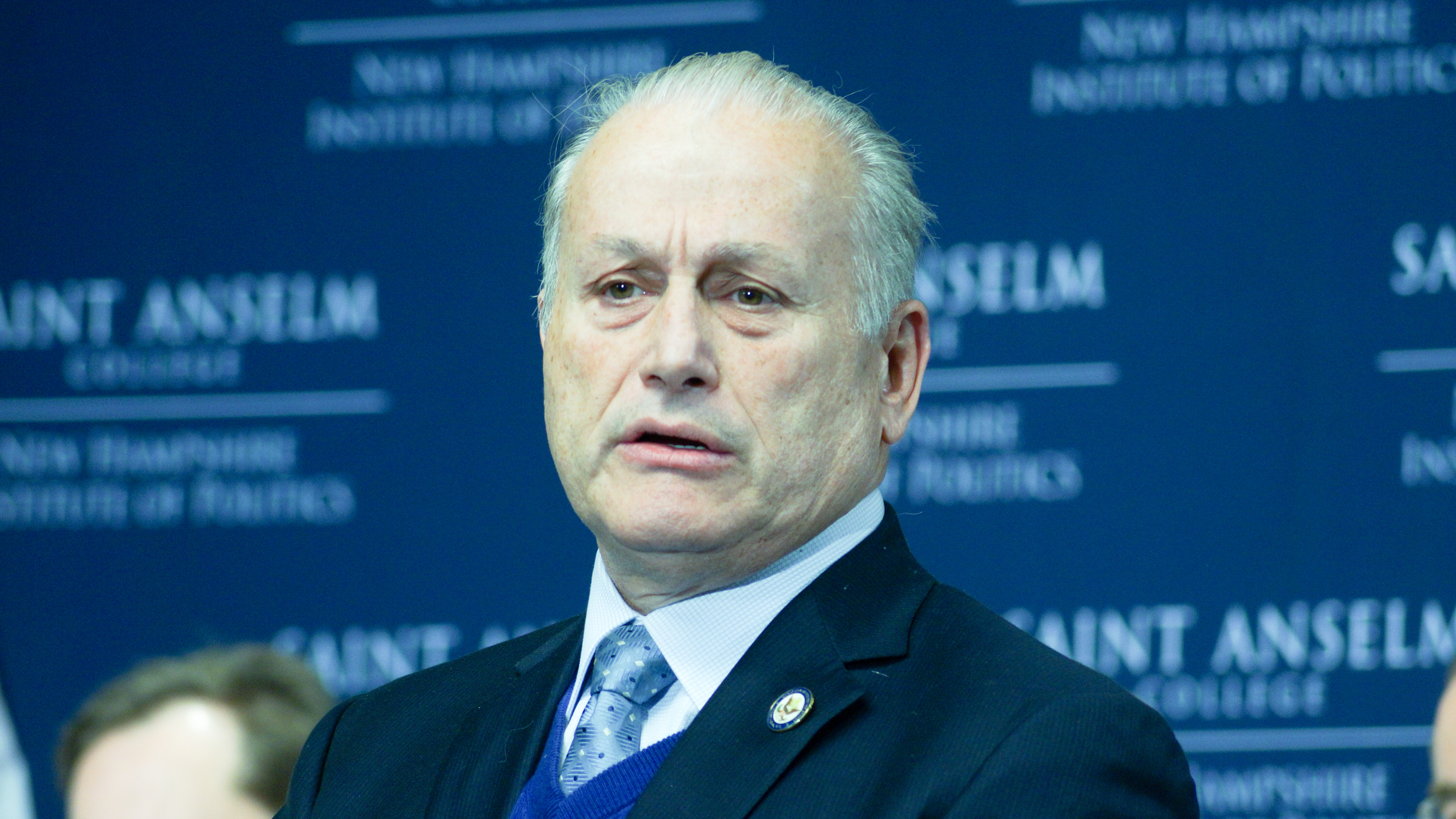
De La Fuente at the "Lesser-Known Candidates Presidential Forum"

De La Fuente filed his candidacy for president of the United States with the Federal Election Commission as a Democrat. He identified himself as a progressive Democrat. He said that he was inspired to run after becoming dissatisfied with the slate of candidates, especially Donald Trump, whom he accused of alienating large segments of the population. On immigration, De La Fuente supported a path to citizenship, and was against the wall proposed by Trump.

De La Fuente has said that he opted to seek the Democratic nomination, rather than the Republican nomination, because he hoped that the Democratic primary's smaller field of candidates would make it easier for him to stand out. The Republican party had 17 candidates, more than three times the number of major candidates who sought the Democratic nomination.

Below is a table of the results of primaries in which De La Fuente competed during the Democratic primaries. The total number of votes he received can be found in the Votes column. His rank among candidates/ballot options can be found in the Place column.

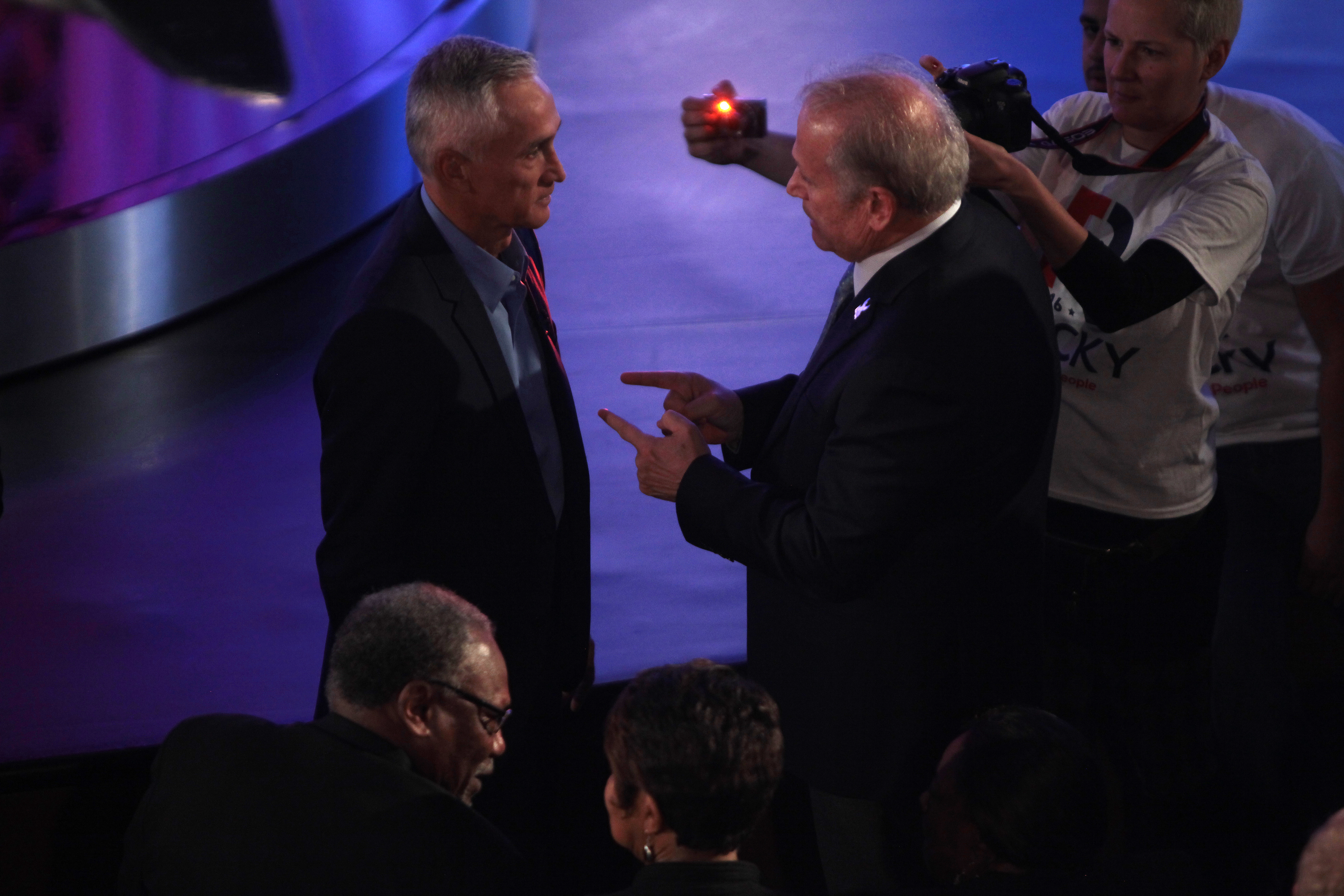
De La Fuente talking to Jorge Ramos at the venue of the Iowa Brown and Black Forum

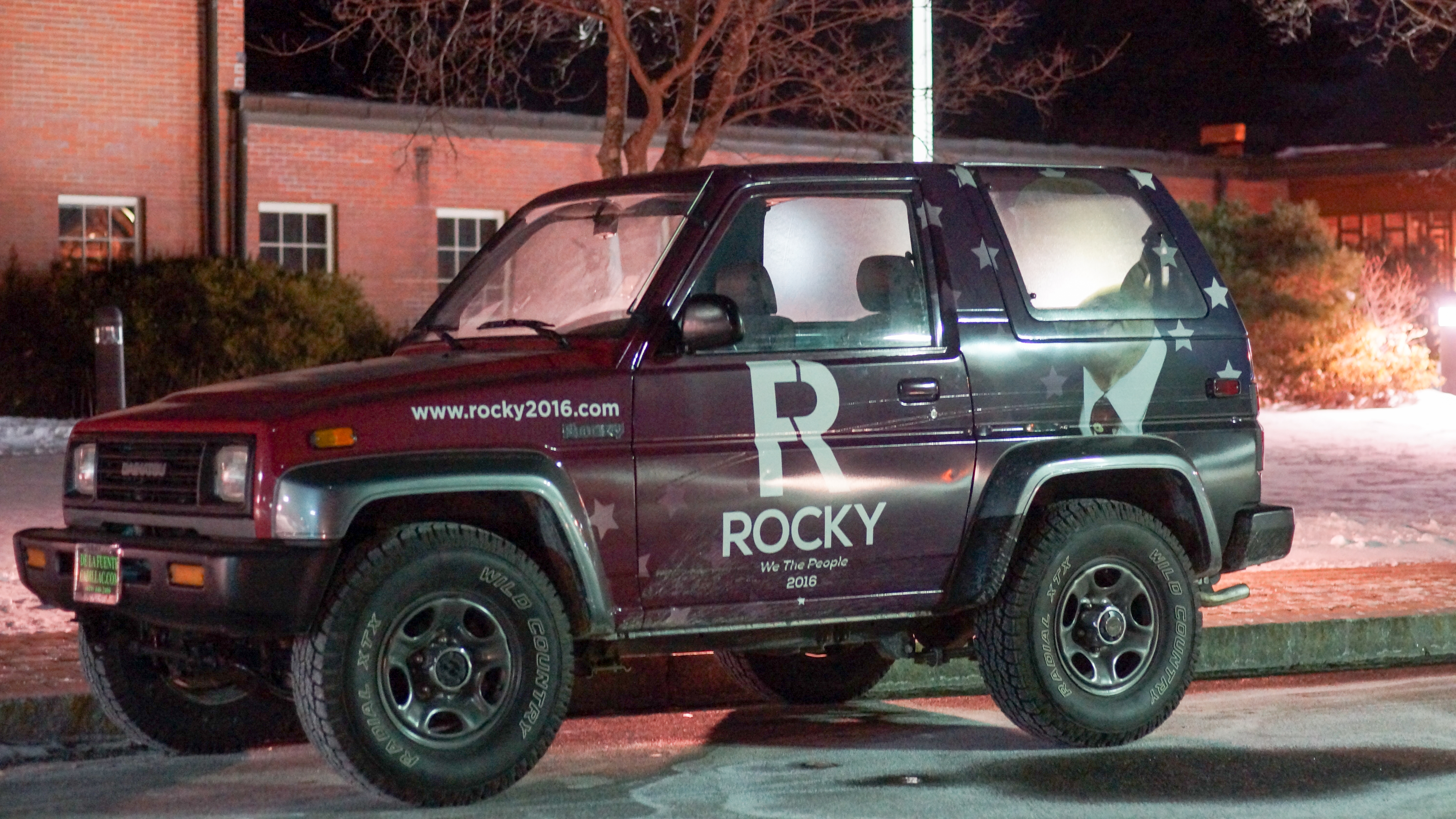
A car decorated to advertise De La Fuente's campaign during the Democratic primaries

Primaries and caucus results
Date	Contest	Votes	Percent	Place	Sources
Feb 9	New Hampshire primary	96	0.04%	8th of 28	
March 1	Alabama primary	818	0.20%	4th	
March 1	American Samoan caucus	14	5.91%	3rd	
March 1	Arkansas primary	1,684	0.76%	6th	
March 1	Massachusetts primary	1,545	0.13%	4th	
March 1	Minnesota caucus	53	0.03%	4th	
March 1	Oklahoma primary	2,485	0.74%	7th	
March 1	Texas primary	8,429	0.59%	3rd of 8	
March 1–8	Democrats Abroad primary	6	0.02%	4th	
March 2	Vermont primary	94	0.06%	4th	
March 5	Louisiana primary	1,341	0.43%	8th of 10	
March 8	Michigan primary	870	0.07%	4th	
March 8	Mississippi primary	481	0.21%	5th	
March 15	Illinois primary	1,802	0.09%	6th	
March 15	Missouri primary	345	0.05%	6th of 9	
March 15	North Carolina primary	3,376	0.30%	4th	
March 15	Ohio primary	9,402	0.76%	3rd	
March 22	Arizona primary	2,797	0.60%	4th of 6	
March 22	Idaho caucus	4	0.02%	3rd	
March 22	Utah caucus	22	0.03%	3rd	
March 26	Alaskan caucus	1	0.01%	3rd	
March 26	Hawaiian caucus	12	0.04%	3rd	
April 5	Wisconsin primary^{A}	18	0.00%	4th	
April 26	Connecticut primary	960	0.29%	3rd	
April 26	Delaware primary	1,024	1.09%	3rd	
April 26	Maryland primary	3,582	0.39%	3rd	
April 26	Pennsylvania primary	14,439	0.86%	3rd	
April 26	Rhode Island primary	145	0.12%	4th	
May 10	West Virginia primary	1010	0.40%	6th	
May 17	Kentucky primary	1,594	0.35%	4th	
June 5	Puerto Rico caucus	391	0.44%	3rd	
June 7	California primary	8,453	0.16%	5th of 7	
June 14	D.C. primary	213	0.22%	3rd	
Total		67,457	0.22%	3rd of 33	

A. As a write-in

=== Polls ===
De La Fuente was almost entirely excluded from polling for the Democratic primary. However, he was included in three statewide polls.

Texas Democratic primary

University of Texas / Texas Tribune poll (February 12–19, 2016)
Candidate	Percent
Rocky De La Fuente	1%
Hillary Clinton	54%
Bernie Sanders	44%
Martin O'Malley (Note: Martin O'Malley had already dropped out of the race, having suspended his campaign on February 1, 2016.)	1%
Willie Wilson	1%
Star Locke	0%
Keith Judd	0%
Calvin Hawes	0%
Sample: 324 LV; Margin of error: 5.99%

North Carolina Democratic primary

High Point University (January 30-February 4, 2016)
Candidate	Percent
Rocky De La Fuente	0%
Hillary Clinton	55%
Bernie Sanders	29%
Martin O'Malley (Note: Martin O'Malley dropped out during the period in which this poll was conducted, suspending his campaign on February 1, 2016.)	1%
Don't Know/Refused	15%
Sample: 478 LV; Margin of error: 4.5%

New Hampshire Democratic primary

Suffolk University poll (January 19–21, 2016)
Candidate	Number of respondents	Percent
Rocky De La Fuente	1	0%
Bernie Sanders	250	50%
Hillary Clinton	207	41%
Undecided	32	6%
Martin O'Malley	9	2%
Other	1	0%
Total	500	100%
Sample: 500 LV; Margin of error: 4.4%

== Third-party general election campaign ==
=== American Delta Party ===
American Delta Party
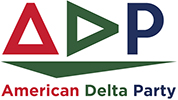
- Abbreviation: ADP
- Founder: Rocky De La Fuente
- Founded: 2016; 10 years ago
- Membership (June 1, 2017): 731 (Delaware)
- Ideology: Social progressivism Fiscal responsibility Electoral reform
- Political position: Center
- Seats in the Senate: 0 / 100
- Seats in the House: 0 / 435
- Governorships: 0 / 50
- State upper house seats: 0 / 1,972
- State lower house seats: 0 / 5,411

Website
- americandeltaparty.org

Ballot access for the American Delta and Reform Party On ballot Lawsuit pending Write-in Not on ballot

De La Fuente founded the American Delta Party, leaving United out of its name, as a vehicle to continue his campaign into the general election as a third-party candidate. He was nominated as the party's presidential nominee. His running mate was Michael Steinberg of Florida. On August 8, 2016, De La Fuente was named as the presidential nominee of the Reform Party.

American Delta Party held its national convention on September 1, 2016, in Chester Springs, Pennsylvania, and nominated De La Fuente to run in the United States presidential election representing his party. He chose Michael Steinberg as his running mate.

=== Qualifications ===
De La Fuente gained ballot access to 147 electoral votes in 20 states (Alaska, Colorado, Florida, Idaho, Iowa, Kentucky, Minnesota, Mississippi, Montana, Nevada, New Hampshire, New Jersey, New Mexico, North Dakota, Rhode Island, Tennessee, Utah, Vermont, Wisconsin, and Wyoming). He qualified as a write-in candidate in Arizona, California, Delaware, Indiana, Maryland, Nebraska, New York, Washington, and West Virginia.

=== Debates and forums ===
During his campaign for Democratic nomination, De La Fuente was not invited to any of the Democratic Party forums and debates. He also did not qualify for any of the presidential debates sponsored by the Commission on Presidential Debates. However, he was invited to and participated in the 2016 Free & Equal Elections debate.

After coming in fourth and winning no delegates in the 2016 Democratic Party presidential primaries and after founding the American Delta Party as a vehicle to run for president of the United States with his running mate Michael Steinberg and as he lacked ballot access to the larger states, on October 25, 2016, he participated in a debate hosted by the Free & Equal Elections Foundation and debated against the Constitution Party candidate Darrell Castle and the Party for Socialism and Liberation candidate Gloria LaRiva.

=== Polls ===
De La Fuente's general election campaign was included in very few polls.

Nevada - Five-way race

Poll source	Date administered	Delta	%	Democrat	%	Republican	%	Libertarian	%	IAPN (Constitution)	%	Lead margin	Sample size	Margin of error
Suffolk	September 27–29, 2016	Rocky De La Fuente	1%	Hillary Clinton	44%	Donald Trump	38%	Gary Johnson	7%	Darrell Castle	1%	6	500	± 4.4%
Suffolk	August 15–17, 2016	Rocky De La Fuente	1%	Hillary Clinton	43.8%	Donald Trump	41.6%	Gary Johnson	4.8%	Darrell Castle	1%	2.2	500	± 4.4%

=== Election results ===
De La Fuente received 33,136 votes in the general election, earning him 0.02% of the total popular vote. He failed to win any electoral votes. In the popular vote De La Fuente placed eighth overall, behind the Democratic Party's Hillary Clinton, Republican Party's Donald Trump, Libertarian Party's Gary Johnson, Green Party's Jill Stein, independent Evan McMullin, Constitution Party's Darrell Castle, and Party for Socialism and Liberation's Gloria La Riva.

De La Fuente received more votes than any Reform Party presidential nominee since Ralph Nader's 2004 campaign.

Electoral results
Presidential candidate	Party	Home state	Popular vote		Electoral vote	Running mate		
Presidential candidate	Party	Home state	Count	Percentage	Electoral vote	Vice-presidential candidate	Home state	Electoral vote
Donald Trump	Republican	New York	62,984,825	46.09%	304	Mike Pence	Indiana	304
Hillary Rodham Clinton	Democratic	New York	65,853,516	48.18%	227	Tim Kaine	Virginia	227
Gary Johnson	Libertarian	New Mexico	4,489,221	3.28%	0	Bill Weld	Massachusetts	0
Jill Stein	Green	Massachusetts	1,457,216	1.07%	0	Ajamu Baraka	Illinois	0
Evan McMullin	Independent	Utah	731,788	0.54%	0	Mindy Finn	District of Columbia	0
Darrell Castle	Constitution	Tennessee	203,010	0.15%	0	Scott Bradley	Utah	0
Rocky De La Fuente	American Delta Party & Reform Party	California	33,136	0.02%	0	Michael Steinberg	Florida	0
Other			736,450	0.53%	—	Other		—
Total			131,313,820	100%	538			538
Needed to win					270			270

==== Recount effort ====
On November 30 (in response to Green Party presidential nominee Jill Stein's efforts to request recounts in Wisconsin and several other states which Donald Trump won), De La Fuente requested a partial recount in Nevada (a state which Hillary Clinton won). He considered this effort to be a "counterbalance" at Stein's efforts. De La Fuente paid the $14,000 that was required for him to request for a recount to be held in a sample from 5% of state-precincts. Nevada's partial recount was completed on December 8, finding no significant discrepancies.

== Campaign finances ==
Detailed below are the financial statements filled with the Federal Election Commission (FEC) of Rocky 2016 LLC as of November 28, 2016.

Receipts
Financial source	Amount (USD)
Federal funds	$0
Itemized individual contributions	$13,156
Unitemized individual contributions	$3,887
Total individual contributions	$17,043
Party committees' contributions	$0
Other committees' contributions	$0
Candidate contributions	$0
Total contributions	$17,043
Transfers from authorized committees	$0
Candidate loans	$7,855,009
Other loans	$0
Total loans	$7,855,009
Offsets to operating expenditures	$0
Fundraising offsets	$0
Legal and accounting offsets	$0
Total offsets	$0
Other receipts	$0
Total receipts	$7,855,009

Disbursements
Disbursements	Amount (USD)
Operating expenditures	$4,337,137
Transfers to authorized committees	$0
Fundraising	$3,146,674
Exempt legal and accounting	$385,982
Candidate loan repayments	$0
Other loan repayments	$0
Individual contribution refunds	$0
Political party contribution refunds	$0
Other committee contribution refunds	$0
Other disbursements	$0
Total disbursements	$7,869,794

Cash summary
Category	Amount (USD)
Beginning cash on hand	$0
Current cash on hand	$2,257
Net contributions	$17,043
Net operating expenditures	$4,339,360
Debts/loans owed by campaign	$7,855,009
Debts/loans owed to campaign	$0

== Endorsements ==
Activists

- Brian Moore
- Deez Nuts
