= 2016 Rhode Island Republican presidential caucuses =

2016 Rhode Island Republican presidential primary
- April 26, 2016

19 pledged delegates to the Republican National Convention
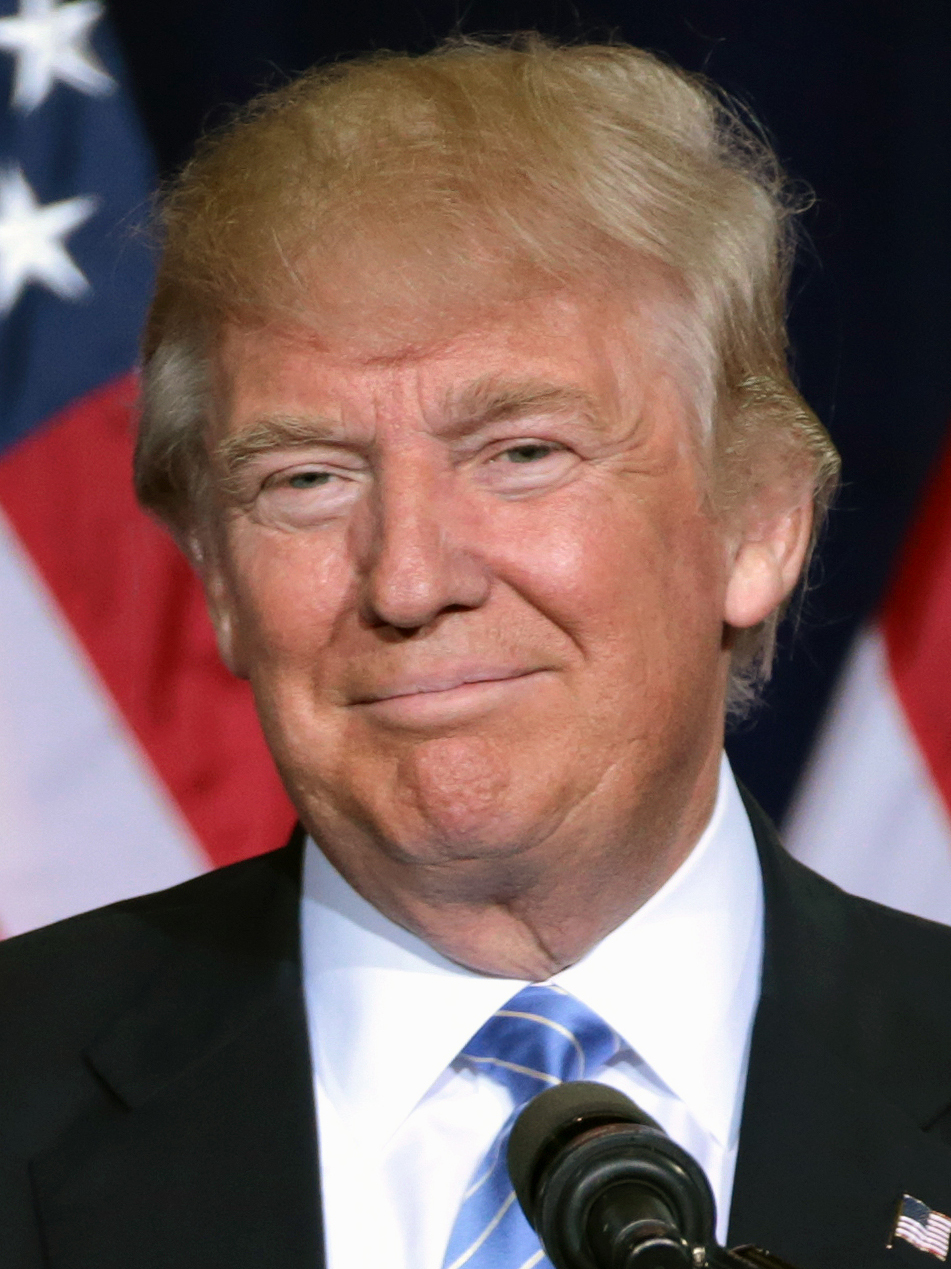

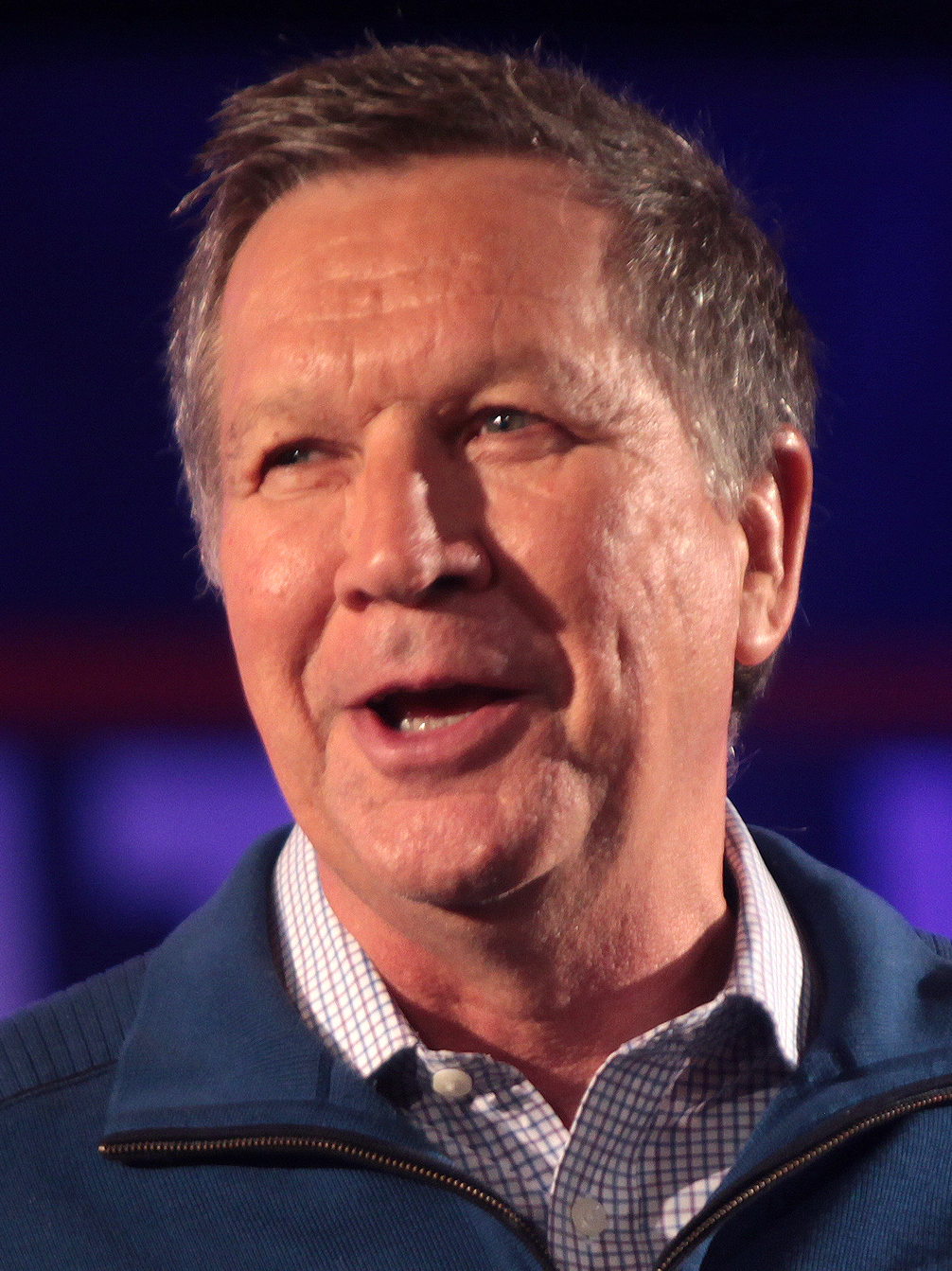

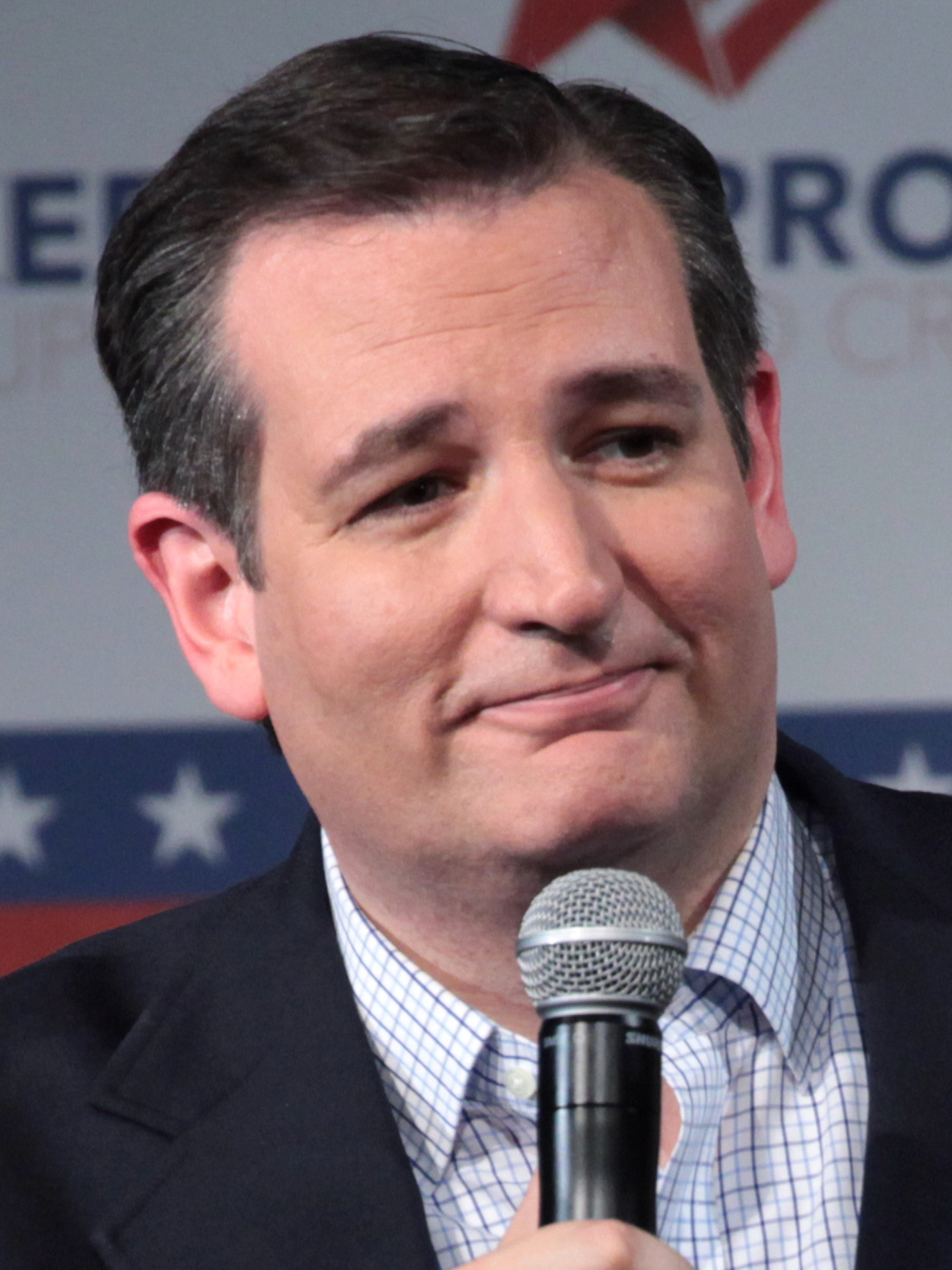

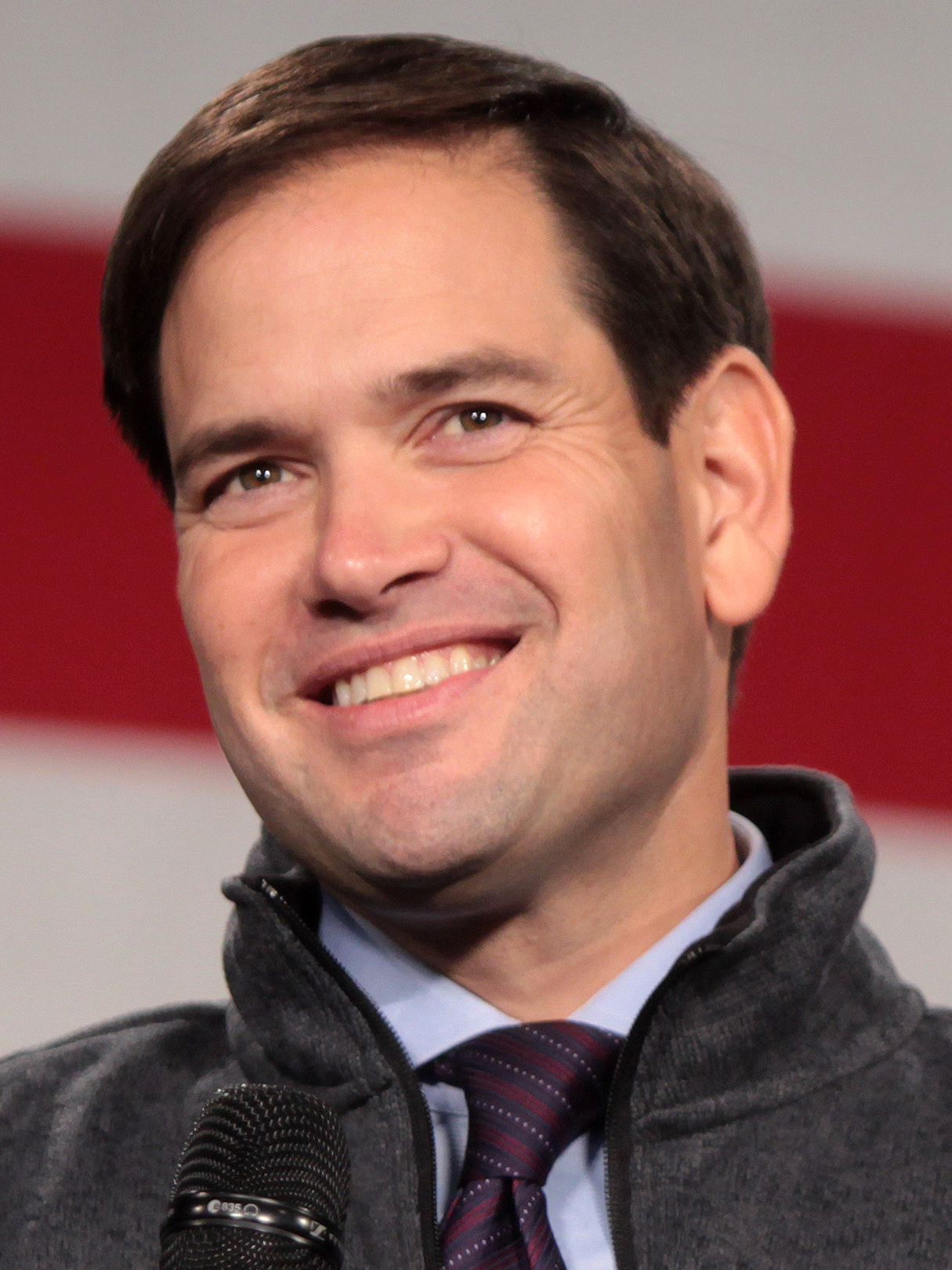
Candidate	Donald Trump	John Kasich
Home state	New York	Ohio
Delegate count	12	5
Popular vote	39,221	14,963
Percentage	63.7%	24.3%
Candidate	Ted Cruz	Marco Rubio
Home state	Texas	Florida
Delegate count	2	0
Popular vote	6,416	382
Percentage	10.4%	0.6%

The 2016 Rhode Island Republican presidential primary took place on April 26, 2016, in which Republican voters nominated delegates for the 2016 Republican nomination.

The Rhode Island Democratic Party presidential primary took place on the same day.

The caucus was originally scheduled to take place on April 23, but the date was changed due to potential conflict with Pesach.

Businessman Donald Trump won the election in a landslide, with 63.7% of the popular vote, compared to runner-up John Kasich's 24.3% and Ted Cruz's 10.4%. Trump's win was partially attributed to independent voters or voters unregistered with the Republican party or the Democratic party. Donald Trump carried a majority of twelve of the nineteen possible delegates, while John Kasich carried five and Ted Cruz carried two. Marco Rubio, the worst performing candidate, who had dropped out but still had ballot access, received no delegates.

== Aftermath ==
The following primary would be Indiana, and resulted in another landslide in favor of Donald Trump. Following Indiana, Florida would hold its own primary, Marco Rubio's home state, and would vote for Donald Trump in an unexpected turn. Following the results, John Kasich would suspend his trailing campaign along with Ted Cruz.

== Results ==
Donald Trump won the contest with 63.7% of the popular vote, with John Kasich ending second with 24.3%, and Ted Cruz ending in third place with 10.4%. Trump carried a majority of 12 possible delegates, while John Kasich carried 5 and Ted Cruz carried 2. Marco Rubio, who had dropped out but still had ballot access, received no delegates.

Rhode Island Republican primary, April 26, 2016
Candidate	Votes	Percentage	Actual delegate count		
Candidate	Votes	Percentage	Bound	Unbound	Total
Donald Trump	39,221	63.7%	12	0	12
John Kasich	14,963	24.3%	5	0	5
Ted Cruz	6,416	10.4%	2	0	2
Uncommitted	417	0.7%	0	0	0
Marco Rubio (withdrawn)	382	0.6%	0	0	0
Write-in	215	0.3%	0	0	0
Unprojected delegates:			0	0	0
Total:	61,614	100.00%	19	0	19
Source: Rhode Island Board of Elections
