= 2016 Maine Democratic presidential caucuses =

- March 6, 2016

Candidate	Bernie Sanders	Hillary Clinton
Home state	Vermont	New York
Delegate count	16	9
Popular vote	2,226	1,231
Percentage	64.17%	35.49%
- County results Bernie Sanders

The 2016 Maine Democratic presidential caucuses took place on March 6 in the U.S. state of Maine as one of the Democratic Party's primaries ahead of the 2016 presidential election.

While on the same day, the Democratic Party didn't hold any other primary, the Republican Party held its Puerto Rico primary the same day.

== Opinion polling ==
Poll source	Date	1st	2nd	Other
Caucus results	March 6, 2016	Bernie Sanders; 64.3	Hillary Clinton; 35.5%	Other; 0.2%
Critical Insights Margin of error: 4% Sample size: 600	September 24–30, 2015	Bernie Sanders; 28%	Hillary Clinton; 27%	Other/DK/NR 45%

== Results ==
Maine Democratic caucuses, March 6, 2016
Candidate	State convention delegates		Estimated delegates		
Candidate	Count	Percentage	Pledged	Unpledged	Total
Bernie Sanders	2,226	64.17%	17	1	18
Hillary Clinton	1,231	35.49%	8	4	12
Uncommitted	12	0.35%	0	0	0
Total	3,469	100%	25	5	30

== Analysis ==
Bernie Sanders scored a large two-to-one victory in Maine, thanks to support in a caucus contest (which favored Sanders) and one that had previously voted for Barack Obama over Hillary Clinton in the 2008 Maine Democratic presidential caucuses. Sanders won in the cities of Portland and Bangor quite comfortably, but his particular strength was in rural areas outside of the cities where he ran up big margins.

Sanders's landslide Maine victory limited Clinton's success in New England to a slim victory in Massachusetts and a more comfortable win in Connecticut on April 26.
