= 2016 Delaware Democratic presidential primary =

- April 26, 2016

Candidate	Hillary Clinton	Bernie Sanders
Home state	New York	Vermont
Delegate count	12	9
Popular vote	55,954	36,662
Percentage	59.75%	39.15%
- Clinton: 40-50% 50-60% 60-70%

The 2016 Delaware Democratic presidential primary were held on April 26 in the U.S. state of Delaware as one of the Democratic Party's primaries ahead of the 2016 presidential election.

The Democratic Party's primaries in Connecticut, Maryland, Pennsylvania and Rhode Island were held the same day, as were Republican primaries in the same five states.

== Opinion polling ==
Poll source	Date	1st	2nd	Other
Official Primary results	April 26, 2016	Hillary Clinton; 59.8%	Bernie Sanders; 39.2%	Other; 1.1%
Gravis Marketing Margin of error: ± 3.1% Sample size: 1,026	April 17–18, 2016	Hillary Clinton; 45%	Bernie Sanders; 38%	Others / Undecided; 17%

== Results ==
2016 Democratic Party's presidential nominating process in Delaware – Summary of results –
Candidate	Popular vote		Estimated delegates		
Candidate	Count	Percentage	Pledged	Unpledged	Total
Hillary Clinton	55,954	59.75%	12	11	23
Bernie Sanders	36,662	39.15%	9	0	9
Roque De La Fuente	1,024	1.09%			
Uncommitted	—N/a		0	0	0
Total	93,640	100%	21	11	32

=== Results by county ===
County	Clinton	%	Sanders	%
Kent	7,338	58.8%	4,980	39.9%
New Castle	38,580	59.5%	25,738	39.7%
Sussex	10,032	61.4%	5,941	36.4%
Total	55,954	59.8%	36,662	39.2%

== Analysis ==
With a coalition of African Americans and college-educated, affluent Caucasian progressive/liberal professionals, Delaware was a state Hillary Clinton was expected to win in the so-called "Acela Primaries" on April 26. Clinton swept all three counties in the state and the largest cities of Wilmington and Dover, winning the primary by 19 points. This marked a clear difference from 2008, when she had lost Delaware to Barack Obama.
