= 2016 Pennsylvania Democratic presidential primary =

- April 26, 2016

88 Democratic National Convention delegates (72 pledged, 16 unpledged)

Candidate	Hillary Clinton	Bernie Sanders
Home state	New York	Vermont
Delegate count	106	83
Popular vote	935,107	731,881
Percentage	55.61%	43.53%
County results
Clinton
40–50%
50–60%
60–70%
Sanders
40–50%
50–60%

The 2016 Pennsylvania Democratic presidential primary was held on April 26 in the U.S. state of Pennsylvania as one of the Democratic Party's primaries ahead of the 2016 presidential election.

The Democratic Party's primaries in Connecticut, Delaware, Maryland and Rhode Island were held the same day, as were Republican primaries in the same five states, including their own Pennsylvania primary. Despite winning the Pennsylvania primary, Clinton went on to lose the state to Republican candidate Donald Trump in the general election.

== Opinion polling ==
Poll source	Date	1st	2nd	3rd	Other
Official Primary results	April 26, 2016	Hillary Clinton; 55.6%	Bernie Sanders; 43.5%		Other; 0.9%
FOX 29/Opinion Savvy Margin of error: ± 3.2% Sample size: 942	April 24, 2016	Hillary Clinton; 52%	Bernie Sanders; 41%		Others / Undecided; 7%
CPEC LLC Margin of error: ± 2.3% Sample size: 665	April 22–24, 2016	Hillary Clinton; 63%	Bernie Sanders; 37%		
Public Policy Polling Margin of error: ± 3.6% Sample size: 728	April 22–24, 2016	Hillary Clinton; 51%	Bernie Sanders; 41%		Others / Undecided; 9%
American Research Group Margin of error: ± 5.0% Sample size: 400	April 21–24, 2016	Hillary Clinton; 58%	Bernie Sanders; 38%		Others / Undecided; 4%
Harper Polling Margin of error: ± 3.9% Sample size: 641	April 21–23, 2016	Hillary Clinton; 61%	Bernie Sanders; 33%		Others / Undecided; 6%
CBS/YouGov Margin of error: ± 6.7% Sample size: 831	April 20–22, 2016	Hillary Clinton; 51%	Bernie Sanders; 43%		Others / Undecided; 6%
NBC/WSJ/Marist Margin of error: ± 1.9% Sample size: 734	April 18–20, 2016	Hillary Clinton; 55%	Bernie Sanders; 40%		Others / Undecided; 5%
Monmouth Margin of error: ± 5.6% Sample size: 302	April 17–19, 2016	Hillary Clinton; 52%	Bernie Sanders; 39%		Others / Undecided; 9%
Franklin & Marshall College Margin of error: ± 5.3% Sample size: 510	April 11–18, 2016	Hillary Clinton; 58%	Bernie Sanders; 31%		Others / Undecided; 11%
FOX News Margin of error: ± 3.5% Sample size: 805	April 4–7, 2016	Hillary Clinton; 49%	Bernie Sanders; 38%		Others / Undecided; 13%
Quinnipiac Margin of error: ± 4.3% Sample size: 514	March 30-April 4, 2016	Hillary Clinton; 50%	Bernie Sanders; 44%		Others / Undecided; 6%
Harper Margin of error: ± 4.0% Sample size: 603	April 2–3, 2016	Hillary Clinton; 55%	Bernie Sanders; 33%		Others / Undecided; 12%
Franklin & Marshall Margin of error: ± 4.7% Sample size: 408	March 14–20, 2016	Hillary Clinton; 53%	Bernie Sanders; 28%		Others / Undecided; 19%
Harper Margin of error: ± 5.3% Sample size: 347	March 1–2, 2016	Hillary Clinton; 57%	Bernie Sanders; 27%		Others / Undecided; 16%
Franklin & Marshall College Margin of error: ± 3.1% Sample size: 486	February 13–21, 2016	Hillary Clinton; 48%	Bernie Sanders; 27%		Others / Undecided; 25%
Robert Morris University Margin of error: ± 4.5% Sample size: 511	February 11–16, 2016	Hillary Clinton; 48%	Bernie Sanders; 41%		Others / Undecided; 11%
Harper Margin of error: ± 3.8% Sample size: 640	January 22–23, 2016	Hillary Clinton; 55%	Bernie Sanders; 28%	Martin O'Malley; 4%	Undecided 13%
Franklin & Marshall Margin of error: ± 3.6% Sample size: 361	January 18–23, 2016	Hillary Clinton; 46%	Bernie Sanders; 29%	Martin O'Malley; 2%	Other 7%, Undecided 16%

Polls in 2015

Poll source	Date	1st	2nd	3rd	Other
Franklin & Marshall Margin of error: ± 3.9% Sample size: 303	October 19–25, 2015	Hillary Clinton; 52%	Bernie Sanders; 18%	Martin O'Malley; 0%	Other 12%, Undecided 18%
Public Policy Polling Margin of error: ± 4.8% Sample size: 416	October 8–11, 2015	Hillary Clinton; 40%	Bernie Sanders; 22%	Joe Biden; 20%	Lincoln Chafee 3%, Martin O'Malley 2%, Lawrence Lessig 1%, Jim Webb 1%, Not Sure 12%
Quinnipiac University Margin of error: ± 4.6% Sample size: 462	August 7–18, 2015	Hillary Clinton; 45%	Bernie Sanders; 19%	Joe Biden; 17%	Jim Webb 1%, Martin O'Malley 1%, Lincoln Chafee 0%, Other 2%, Wouldn't vote 3%, Undecided 12%
Quinnipiac University Margin of error: ± 4.9% Sample size: 402	June 4–15, 2015	Hillary Clinton; 53%	Joe Biden; 15%	Bernie Sanders; 10%	Jim Webb 2%, Martin O'Malley 1%, Lincoln Chafee 0%, Other 1%, Wouldn't vote 4%, Undecided 15%
Public Policy Polling Margin of error: ± 5% Sample size: 385	May 21–24, 2015	Hillary Clinton; 63%	Bernie Sanders; 14%	Martin O'Malley; 6%	Lincoln Chafee 3%, Jim Webb 3%, Not sure 12%
Quinnipiac University Margin of error: ± 4.8% Sample size: 415	March 17–28, 2015	Hillary Clinton; 48%	Elizabeth Warren; 15%	Joe Biden; 13%	Martin O'Malley 1%, Bernie Sanders 1%, Jim Webb 1%, Other 2%, Wouldn't vote 4%, Undecided 15%
Quinnipiac University Margin of error: ± 4.8% Sample size: 415	March 17–28, 2015	Joe Biden; 34%	Elizabeth Warren; 27%	Martin O'Malley; 4%	Bernie Sanders 2%, Jim Webb 1%, Other 3%, Wouldn't vote 5%, Undecided 25%
Quinnipiac University Margin of error: ± 5% Sample size: 392	January 22 – February 1, 2015	Hillary Clinton; 54%	Elizabeth Warren; 12%	Joe Biden; 10%	Martin O'Malley 2%, Bernie Sanders 2%, Jim Webb 1%, Other 1%, Wouldn't vote 4%, Undecided 15%
Quinnipiac University Margin of error: ± 5% Sample size: 392	January 22 – February 1, 2015	Joe Biden; 34%	Elizabeth Warren; 21%	Martin O'Malley; 5%	Jim Webb 4%, Bernie Sanders 3%, Other 2%, Wouldn't vote 5%, Undecided 26%
Public Policy Polling Margin of error: ± 4.4% Sample size: 494	January 15–18, 2015	Hillary Clinton; 58%	Joe Biden; 13%	Elizabeth Warren; 11%	Bernie Sanders 5%, Martin O'Malley 1%, Jim Webb 1%, Someone else/Undecided 11%

Polls in 2014

Poll source	Date	1st	2nd	3rd	Other
Public Policy Polling Margin of error: ± 5% Sample size: 382	May 30 – June 1, 2014	Hillary Clinton; 65%	Joe Biden; 9%	Andrew Cuomo; 5%	Elizabeth Warren 5%, Cory Booker 4%, Kirsten Gillibrand 1%, Brian Schweitzer 1%, Mark Warner 1%, Martin O'Malley 0%, Someone else/Not sure 10%
Franklin & Marshall College Margin of error: ± 4.3% Sample size: 524	March 25–31, 2014	Hillary Clinton; 55%	Joe Biden; 5%	Elizabeth Warren; 4%	Andrew Cuomo 2%, Howard Dean 0%, Other 5%, Undecided 29%
Franklin & Marshall College Margin of error: ± 4.2% Sample size: 548	February 18–23, 2014	Hillary Clinton; 58%	Elizabeth Warren; 7%	Joe Biden; 6%	Andrew Cuomo 2%, Howard Dean 1%, Other 3%, Undecided 23%

Polls in 2013

Poll source	Date	1st	2nd	3rd	Other
Public Policy Polling Margin of error: ± 4.7% Sample size: 436	November 22–25, 2013	Hillary Clinton; 61%	Joe Biden; 13%	Elizabeth Warren; 11%	Andrew Cuomo 3%, Cory Booker 2%, Kirsten Gillibrand 1%, Martin O'Malley 0%, Brian Schweitzer 0%, Mark Warner 0%, Someone Else/Undecided 9%

== Results ==
Pennsylvania Democratic primary, April 26, 2016
Candidate	Popular vote		Estimated delegates		
Candidate	Count	Percentage	Pledged	Unpledged	Total
Hillary Clinton	935,107	55.61%	106	20	126
Bernie Sanders	731,881	43.53%	83	0	83
Rocky De La Fuente	14,439	0.86%	0	0	0
Total	1,681,427	100%	189	20	209

=== Results by county ===
County	Clinton	%	Sanders	%	Others	Totals	Turnout	Margin
Adams	3,863	48.08%	4,101	51.04%	71	8,035	41.15%	-2.96%
Allegheny	123,715	55.08%	99,078	44.11%	1,819	224,612	43.18%	10.97%
Armstrong	2,992	48.30%	3,073	49.60%	130	6,195	39.00%	-1.31%
Beaver	13,531	56.92%	9,873	41.53%	369	23,773	40.41%	15.39%
Bedford	1,388	48.91%	1,387	48.87%	63	2,838	29.56%	0.04%
Berks	21,063	48.35%	22,078	50.68%	422	43,563	37.68%	-2.33%
Blair	3,965	46.87%	4,360	51.54%	135	23,988	35.27%	-4.67%
Bradford	1,809	48.88%	1,839	49.69%	53	3,701	35.49%	-0.81%
Bucks	46,917	55.90%	36,173	43.10%	837	83,927	43.88%	12.80%
Butler	8,790	52.10%	7,833	46.43%	249	16,872	40.98%	5.67%
Cambria	8,507	47.16%	9,024	50.02%	509	18,040	39.64%	-2.87%
Cameron	186	41.89%	240	54.05%	18	444	36.33%	-12.16%
Carbon	3,384	48.73%	3,460	49.82%	101	6,945	38.13%	-1.09%
Centre	8,458	44.72%	10,331	54.63%	123	18,912	41.15%	-9.90%
Chester	33,082	55.62%	26,193	44.04%	204	59,479	46.05%	11.58%
Clarion	1,529	49.34%	1,511	48.76%	59	3,099	38.37%	0.58%
Clearfield	3,194	47.30%	3,414	50.56%	145	6,753	32.18%	-3.26%
Clinton	1,704	48.63%	1,739	49.63%	61	3,504	39.02%	-1.00%
Columbia	2,504	40.48%	3,601	58.21%	81	6,186	39.59%	-17.73%
Crawford	3,707	48.69%	3,789	49.76%	118	7,614	39.39%	-1.08%
Cumberland	12,421	51.54%	11,513	47.77%	168	24,102	45.45%	3.77%
Dauphin	18,474	56.82%	13,787	42.41%	250	32,511	36.26%	14.42%
Delaware	46,252	59.73%	30,824	39.80%	363	77,439	43.45%	19.92%
Elk	1,601	45.50%	1,846	52.46%	72	3,519	36.47%	-6.96%
Erie	20,395	52.17%	18,362	46.97%	338	39,095	40.76%	5.20%
Fayette	9,195	57.69%	6,460	40.53%	285	15,940	32.70%	17.16%
Forest	251	52.07%	221	45.85%	10	482	37.28%	6.22%
Franklin	4,707	51.69%	4,282	47.02%	118	9,107	37.27%	4.67%
Fulton	366	48.87%	365	48.73%	18	749	28.81%	0.13%
Greene	2,268	52.55%	1,927	44.65%	121	4,316	34.27%	7.90%
Huntingdon	1,304	43.28%	1,666	55.29%	43	3,013	33.11%	-12.01%
Indiana	4,049	50.34%	3,839	47.73%	156	8,044	40.04%	2.61%
Jefferson	1,249	43.89%	1,507	52.95%	90	9,712	29.30%	-9.07%
Juniata	664	45.60%	754	51.79%	38	3,996	36.44%	-6.18%
Lackawanna	23,020	56.52%	17,308	42.49%	402	40,730	45.36%	14.02%
Lancaster	19,840	47.97%	21,321	51.55%	197	41,358	40.14%	-3.58%
Lawrence	5,845	58.64%	3,981	39.94%	142	9,968	36.39%	18.70%
Lebanon	4,669	49.88%	4,599	49.13%	93	9,361	35.78%	0.75%
Lehigh	20,430	52.40%	18,338	47.03%	224	38,992	35.66%	5.37%
Luzerne	20,542	51.94%	18,543	46.89%	462	39,547	37.49%	5.05%
Lycoming	3,808	43.94%	4,730	54.58%	128	8,666	39.29%	-10.64%
McKean	1,053	46.18%	1,190	52.19%	37	2,280	31.50%	-6.01%
Mercer	6,530	56.99%	4,739	41.36%	190	11,459	33.91%	15.63%
Miflin	1,201	48.29%	1,242	49.94%	44	2,487	32.93%	-1.65%
Monroe	8,169	53.27%	7,042	45.92%	123	15,334	31.37%	7.35%
Montgomery	75,628	59.00%	52,132	40.67%	421	128,181	49.31%	18.33%
Montour	846	47.85%	890	50.34%	32	1,768	37.84%	-2.49%
Northampton	18,104	51.18%	16,940	47.89%	328	35,372	37.27%	3.29%
Northumberland	3,582	48.92%	3,632	49.60%	108	7,322	33.78%	-0.68%
Perry	1,329	42.60%	1,752	56.15%	39	3,120	43.59%	-13.56%
Philadelphia	218,959	62.59%	129,353	36.98%	1,493	349,805	43.50%	25.62%
Pike	2,009	51.22%	1,894	48.29%	19	3,922	29.70%	2.93%
Potter	402	40.94%	560	57.03%	20	982	33.83%	-16.09%
Schuylkill	6,534	51.30%	6,040	47.42%	164	12,738	37.61%	3.88%
Snyder	1,125	50.40%	1,081	48.43%	26	2,232	41.42%	1.97%
Somerset	3,114	48.18%	3,206	49.61%	143	6,463	35.95%	-1.42%
Sullivan	312	50.16%	296	47.59%	14	622	40.65%	2.57%
Susquehanna	1,680	50.42%	1,610	48.32%	42	3,332	41.41%	2.10%
Tioga	1,055	43.20%	1,354	55.45%	33	2,442	34.07%	-12.24%
Union	1,626	50.50%	1,579	49.04%	15	3,220	46.09%	1.46%
Venango	2,020	48.08%	2,087	49.68%	94	4,201	37.90%	-1.59%
Warren	1,836	51.66%	1,665	46.85%	53	3,554	33.49%	4.81%
Washington	15,872	57.43%	11,262	40.75%	505	27,639	41.38%	16.68%
Wayne	1,859	47.44%	2,026	51.70%	34	3,919	39.12%	-4.26%
Westmoreland	25,009	54.31%	20,286	44.05%	754	46,049	39.24%	10.26%
Wyoming	1,123	48.21%	1,168	50.42%	33	2,398	45.72%	-2.21%
York	18,459	50.72%	17,544	48.21%	390	36,393	36.74%	2.51%
Total	935,107	55.61%	731,881	43.53%	14,439	1,681,427	41.39%	12.09%

== Analysis ==
Clinton won a large victory over runner-up Bernie Sanders in Pennsylvania, replicating her 2008 performance against Barack Obama in Pennsylvania. According to exit polls, Clinton won the white vote 51–47 (68% of the electorate), won the African American vote 70–30 (19% of the electorate), and won among women 60-39 (she lost men 50–49 to Sanders). While Sanders won among younger voters 63–37, Clinton won voters over the age of 45 66–33. Clinton swept all income and educational attainment levels except for whites without college degrees, whom Sanders won 50–49.

Clinton swept all political ideologies in the primary. She won Democrats 62-38 but lost self-identified Independents to Sanders 72–26.

Clinton also won among unions 56–43, a very important demographic in a big manufacturing state like Pennsylvania.

Clinton won large victories in all of Pennsylvania's major cities: she won in Philadelphia 63–37, the affluent Philadelphia suburbs 58–42, and also carried the cities of Pittsburgh and Erie. She won in Northeastern Pennsylvania 51–48, and in Western Pennsylvania 54–45. Sanders, for his part, did better in the rural parts of the state, winning rural voters 50–48 and carrying Central Pennsylvania 50–49. Sanders swept many of the more remote and conservative counties of the state, including parts of Amish country such as Lancaster County.

Of her victory in Pennsylvania, New York Times analyst Alan Rappeport commented, "Lots of Philadelphia history and imagery coming from Clinton now. It's almost as if she has her convention speech ready."
