= Michael Steinberg (lawyer) =

American lawyer (born 1959)

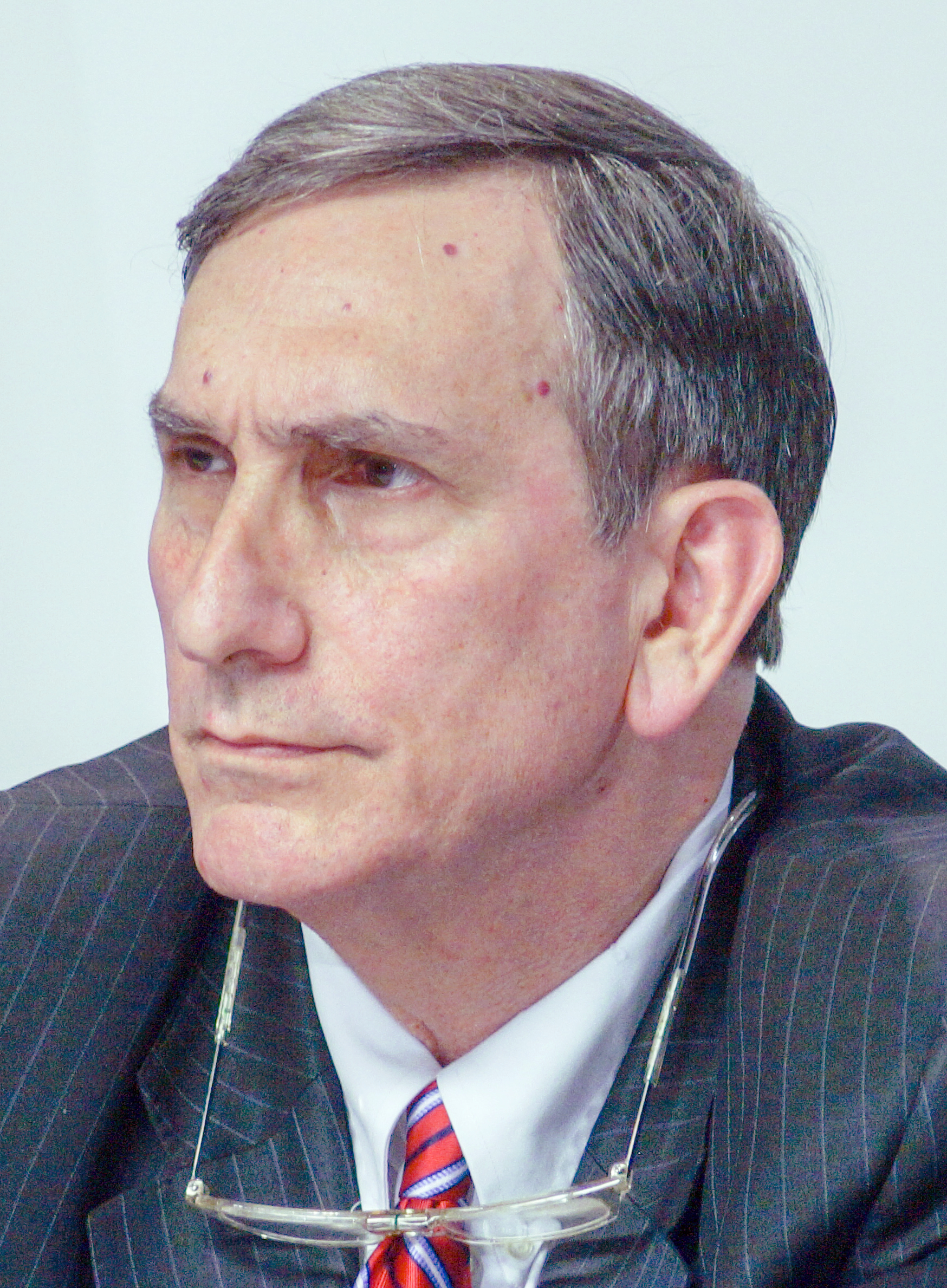
- Steinberg in 2016
- Born: February 6, 1959 (age 67)
- Citizenship: American
- Education: University of Florida
- Political party: Democratic (before 2016); American Delta (2016); Reform (2016–present)
- Spouse: Miriam Steinberg
- Children: 3

Michael Alan Steinberg (born February 6, 1959) is an American lawyer and politician. He has been an unsuccessful candidate in several Florida state legislature elections, and a candidate for the Democratic presidential nomination in the 2016 election. He was also the Reform Party's nominee for Vice President of the United States in the 2016 election.

Steinberg has been practicing law for over 30 years, and his firm, Michael Steinberg & Associates, provides legal services to clients in social security, veteran's compensation, long-term disability insurance, and state disability matters. The Tampa Bay Times cited him saying that the aging population of Tampa Bay and the area's declining economy were the cause of an increase in local legal claims. Between 2008 and 2009, the 21 percent increase in social security disability legal claims in Tampa Bay broke the nationwide record.

In 2014, his wife Miriam ran for a Florida state legislature seat in District 64, where he had run unsuccessfully in 2002.

== Background ==
Steinberg married his wife Miriam in 1984. Miriam is originally from Israel. The two have three adult daughters. He is a member of a Conservative synagogue in Tampa, Florida.

Steinberg received his bachelor's degree in economics and a J.D. degree from the University of Florida. In addition to his career as an attorney practicing social security law, he has served on the Florida Bar Association's military law subcommittee.

== Political involvement ==
=== 2002 Florida state legislature election ===
In 2002, Steinberg ran for election for the Florida state legislature in District 64; his candidacy was endorsed by the St. Petersburg Times. Two months after losing the election, Steinberg filed a lawsuit against the state Republican party for push polling against him in the election. The Florida Republican Party hired Tarrance Group, a Virginia-based polling company, to survey voters across the state. Towson Fraser, spokesman for the Republican Party of Florida at the time, denied that his party used push polls.

Steinberg ran again for this seat in 2010 and lost.

=== 2006 congressional election ===
In 2006, Steinberg received 1,334 votes (3.4% of the popular vote) in the Democratic primary race for Florida's 11th congressional district.

=== 2014 wife's candidacy ===
When his wife, Miriam Steinberg, was running for office in 2014, he filed a lawsuit to disqualify a competing write-in candidate. Although the lawsuit was successful, the election was ruled invalid, and the seat was vacant until a special election could be held. As a result, J. W. Grant, who was out of office for a period, was automatically the winner of the election despite having reached his term limit. Miriam lost the election to Grant by a 59:40 margin.

It was later ruled that write-in candidate should not have been disqualified, and subsequently, the election was ruled unconstitutional and the Florida legislature voted not to accept the result. Miriam then failed to file new fees to run again against Grant in a special election; although Michael filed a claim against the Florida Election Commission disputing the fee requirement. This resulted in Grant's only opponent being a write-in candidate. No write-in candidate has ever won an election in Florida.

Grant was about to be running up against a Florida term limit law, but because the regular election was ruled invalid the seat was vacant for most of 2015 legislative session.

=== 2016 presidential election campaign ===
Steinberg filed papers with the U.S. Federal Election Commission in November 2013 to run for president in the 2016 election as a Democrat.

=== 2016 vice-presidential candidacy ===
After failing to gain traction for his presidential bid, he was then nominated by the American Delta Party, and by the Reform Party of the United States as the vice-presidential running mate of 2016 presidential candidate Rocky De La Fuente.

== Personal life ==
Steinberg and his wife Miriam live in Florida. The couple has three children.

Party political offices
Preceded by Ken Cross	Reform nominee for Vice President of the United States; 2016	Most recent
