= 2016 Alabama Democratic presidential primary =

- March 1, 2016

Candidate	Hillary Clinton	Bernie Sanders
Home state	New York	Vermont
Delegate count	44	9
Popular vote	309,928	76,399
Percentage	77.84%	19.19%
- County results Clinton: <50% 50–60% 60–70% 70–80% 80–90% >90%

The 2016 Alabama Democratic presidential primary took place on March 1 in the U.S. state of Alabama as one of the Democratic Party's primaries ahead of the 2016 presidential election.

On the same day, dubbed "Super Tuesday," Democratic primaries were held in ten other states plus American Samoa, while the Republican Party held primaries in eleven states including their own Alabama primary.

== Opinion polling ==
Poll source	Date	1st	2nd	Other
Primary results	March 1, 2016	Hillary Clinton; 77.8%	Bernie Sanders; 19.2%	Other; 3.0%
Monmouth Margin of error: ± 5.8% Sample size: 300	February 25–28, 2016	Hillary Clinton; 71%	Bernie Sanders; 23%	Others / Undecided; 6%
Public Policy Polling Margin of error: ± 4.4; Sample size: 500	February 14–16, 2016	Hillary Clinton; 59%	Bernie Sanders; 31%	
News-5/Strategy Research Margin of error: ± 2 percent Sample size: 3,500	August 11, 2015	Hillary Clinton; 78%	Bernie Sanders 10%	

== Results ==
Primary date: March 1, 2016
National delegates: 60

2016 Democratic Party's presidential nominating process in Alabama – Summary of results –
Candidate	Popular vote (March 1 primary)		Estimated delegates		
Candidate	Count	Percentage	Pledged	Unpledged	Total
Hillary Clinton (campaign)	309,928	77.84%	44	6	50
Bernie Sanders (campaign)	76,399	19.19%	9	0	9
Martin O'Malley (campaign) (withdrawn)	1,485	0.37%			
Rocky De La Fuente (campaign)	811	0.20%			
Uncommitted	9,534	2.39%	0	1	1
Total	398,157	100%	53	7	60

=== Results by county ===
County	Clinton	%	Sanders	%	Others	Totals	Turnout	Margin
Autauga	2,387	80.0%	544	18.2%				
Baldwin	5,290	64.7%	2,694	32.9%				
Barbour	2,567	90.6%	222	7.8%				
Bibb	942	75.5%	246	19.7%				
Blount	564	55.1%	395	38.6%				
Bullock	2,451	91.3%	178	6.6%				
Butler	2,196	92.1%	156	6.5%				
Calhoun	5,011	76.5%	1,425	21.8%				
Chambers	2,899	88.6%	312	9.5%				
Cherokee	712	66.1%	268	24.9%				
Chilton	860	73.1%	289	24.6%				
Choctaw	1,772	80.2%	273	12.4%				
Clarke	3,148	93.0%	213	6.3%				
Clay	807	81.8%	135	13.7%				
Cleburne	221	73.2%	72	23.8%				
Coffee	1,493	77.2%	389	20.1%				
Colbert	3,879	65.0%	1,342	22.5%				
Conecuh	2,031	71.4%	544	19.1%				
Coosa	1,012	87.7%	125	10.8%				
Covington	737	77.3%	188	19.7%				
Crenshaw	908	87.8%	107	10.3%				
Cullman	1,275	60.8%	723	34.5%				
Dale	1,544	77.0%	415	20.7%				
Dallas	8,577	74.4%	1,774	15.4%				
DeKalb	1,297	62.9%	667	32.3%				
Elmore	3,019	80.1%	694	18.4%				
Escambia	2,027	88.5%	226	9.9%				
Etowah	4,262	74.6%	1,289	22.6%				
Fayette	660	76.7%	148	17.2%				
Franklin	1,233	48.4%	767	30.1%				
Geneva	544	74.9%	157	21.6%				
Greene	2,714	90.1%	213	7.1%				
Hale	2,426	79.6%	427	14.0%				
Henry	1,170	85.6%	163	11.9%				
Houston	3,044	78.3%	780	20.1%				
Jackson	1,327	70.0%	510	26.9%				
Jefferson	67,357	81.6%	14,319	17.4%				
Lamar	442	61.6%	173	24.1%				
Lauderdale	3,676	65.2%	1,745	30.9%				
Lawrence	2,047	77.7%	428	16.2%				
Lee	7,137	73.6%	2,464	25.4%				
Limestone	3,199	72.8%	1,120	25.5%				
Lowndes	3,782	88.7%	330	7.7%				
Macon	4,293	89.2%	483	10.0%				
Madison	19,995	68.6%	8,786	30.1%				
Marengo	3,590	65.8%	1,092	20.0%				
Marion	567	65.5%	256	29.6%				
Marshall	1,494	62.1%	821	34.1%				
Mobile	28,927	82.7%	5,672	16.2%				
Monroe	2,438	90.9%	205	7.6%				
Montgomery	28,650	86.2%	4,266	12.8%				
Morgan	3,897	73.1%	1,345	25.2%				
Perry	2,575	82.0%	389	12.4%				
Pickens	2,326	76.2%	453	14.8%				
Pike	2,183	83.7%	379	14.5%				
Randolph	1,236	70.6%	328	18.7%				
Russell	4,381	72.8%	988	16.4%				
Shelby	6,657	62.8%	3,755	35.4%				
St. Clair	1,808	69.3%	745	28.6%				
Sumter	2,987	80.9%	416	11.3%				
Talladega	5,561	86.5%	782	12.2%				
Tallapoosa	2,658	88.0%	308	10.2%				
Tuscaloosa	12,136	76.7%	3,444	21.8%				
Walker	1,722	67.1%	727	27.5%				
Washington	1,511	57.5%	562	21.4%				
Wilcox	3,337	84.3%	410	10.4%				
Winston	303	66.7%	138	30.4%				
Total	309,928	77.8%	76,399	19.2%				

== Analysis ==
After losing Alabama badly to Barack Obama in 2008, Clinton bounced back eight years later to a 58-point routing against runner-up Bernie Sanders. Her landslide win in Alabama came from African Americans, who formed 54% of the Democratic electorate and backed Clinton over Sanders by a margin of 91–6. Clinton also won the white vote by a margin of 59–38.

Clinton carried every county in the state, but showed particular strength in the region in Central Alabama known as the Cotton Belt where the share of African American voters is highest, including the city of Birmingham. She also showed strength in and around the city of Mobile including Mobile Bay, along the Gulf Coast.

Clinton's Alabama victory was her second-highest in any state in the 2016 primary season.

After his landslide defeat, the Sanders campaign reported that Hillary Clinton had notched wins in southern states including Alabama because Bernie Sanders did not compete with her, although this claim was widely debunked since Sanders had opened more campaign offices in the state before the primary.
