= 2016 Rhode Island Democratic presidential primary =

- April 26, 2016

Candidate	Bernie Sanders	Hillary Clinton
Home state	Vermont	New York
Delegate count	13	11
Popular vote	66,993	52,749
Percentage	54.71%	43.08%
- Sanders: 50-60% 60-70% Clinton: 40-50% 50-60%

The 2016 Rhode Island Democratic presidential primary were held on April 26 in the U.S. state of Rhode Island as one of the Democratic Party's primaries ahead of the 2016 presidential election.

The Democratic Party's primaries in Connecticut, Delaware, Maryland and Pennsylvania were held the same day, as were Republican primaries in the same five states, including their own Rhode Island primary.

== Opinion polling ==
Poll source	Date	1st	2nd	Other
Certified Primary results	April 26, 2016	Bernie Sanders; 54.7%	Hillary Clinton; 43.1%	Others / Uncommitted; 2.2%
Public Policy Polling Margin of error: ± 3.8% Sample size: 668	April 22–24, 2016	Bernie Sanders; 49%	Hillary Clinton; 45%	Others / Undecided; 6%
Brown University Margin of error: ± 4.0% Sample size: 436	April 19–21, 2016	Hillary Clinton; 43%	Bernie Sanders; 34%	Others / Undecided; 23%
Brown University Margin of error: ± ?% Sample size: 394	February 22–23, 2016	Hillary Clinton; 49%	Bernie Sanders; 40%	Others / Undecided; 11%
Brown University Margin of error: ± ?% Sample size: 396	February 17–20, 2016	Bernie Sanders; 48%	Hillary Clinton; 41%	Others / Undecided; 11%

== Results ==
Rhode Island Democratic primary, April 26, 2016
Candidate	Popular vote		Estimated delegates		
Candidate	Count	Percentage	Pledged	Unpledged	Total
Bernie Sanders	66,993	54.71%	13	0	13
Hillary Clinton	52,749	43.08%	11	9	20
Mark Stewart	236	0.19%	0	0	0
Rocky De La Fuente	145	0.12%	0	0	0
Write-in	673	0.55%	0	0	0
Uncommitted	1,662	1.36%	0	0	0
Total	122,458	100%	24	9	33

=== Results by county ===
County	Clinton	Votes	Sanders	Votes
Bristol	47.3%	3,210	51.6%	3,507
Kent	40.0%	7,162	58.1%	10,404
Newport	42.5%	4,433	56.4%	5,891
Providence	44.6%	29,158	53.6%	35,019
Washington	37.9%	6,136	60.8%	9,858
Total	43.1%	52,749	54.7%	66,993

== Analysis ==
With its socially liberal coalition of mostly white Irish Catholic/Portuguese Catholic/Italian Catholic voters, Rhode Island was seen as Bernie Sanders's best chance at victory in the so-called "Acela Primaries" on April 26. He pulled out an 11-point win in Rhode Island on election day. He carried all municipalities but four, winning in the major cities of Providence and Warwick.

Sanders's Rhode Island win limited Clinton's success in New England to slimmer victories in Massachusetts and Connecticut.
