= 2016 Connecticut Democratic presidential primary =

- April 26, 2016

Candidate	Hillary Clinton	Bernie Sanders
Home state	New York	Vermont
Delegate count	28	27
Popular vote	170,045	152,379
Percentage	51.80%	46.42%
- Clinton: 40-50% 50-60% 60-70% 70-80% Sanders: 40-50% 50-60% 60-70%

The 2016 Connecticut Democratic presidential primary were held on April 26 in the U.S. state of Connecticut as one of the Democratic Party's primaries ahead of the 2016 presidential election.

The Democratic Party's primaries in Delaware, Maryland, Pennsylvania and Rhode Island were held the same day, as are Republican primaries in the same five states, including their own Connecticut primary.

Clinton has many endorsements from the state's Congressional delegation, including the popular Senator Chris Murphy. Clinton campaigned to Sanders' left on gun control, which paid off for her with mothers in the wake of the Sandy Hook Elementary School Shooting.

== Opinion polling ==
Poll source	Date	1st	2nd	Other
Official Primary results	April 26, 2016	Hillary Clinton; 51.8%	Bernie Sanders; 46.4%	Others / Uncommitted; 1.8%
Public Policy Polling Margin of error: ± 3.7% Sample size: 709	April 22–24, 2016	Hillary Clinton; 48%	Bernie Sanders; 46%	Others / Undecided; 6%
Quinnipiac Margin of error: ± 3.0% Sample size: 1,037	April 12–18, 2016	Hillary Clinton; 51%	Bernie Sanders; 42%	Others / Undecided; 8%
Emerson College Margin of error: ± 5.2% Sample size: 356	April 10–11, 2016	Hillary Clinton; 49%	Bernie Sanders; 43%	Others / Undecided; 3%
Emerson College Polling Society Margin of error: ± 6% Sample size: 251 LV	November 17, 2015	Hillary Clinton; 49.6%	Bernie Sanders; 30.7%	Martin O’Malley 9.1% Other 3.2% Undecided 6.6%
Quinnipiac University Margin of error: ± 4% Sample size: 610	October 7–11, 2015	Hillary Clinton; 35%	Bernie Sanders; 25%	Joe Biden 18% Lincoln Chafee 0% Lawrence Lessig 0% Martin O’Malley 0% Jim Webb 0% Other 1% Wouldn't vote 6% Undecided 12%
Quinnipiac University Margin of error: ± 4% Sample size: 610	October 7–11, 2015	Hillary Clinton; 47%	Bernie Sanders; 29%	Jim Webb 1% Lincoln Chafee 0% Lawrence Lessig 0% Martin O’Malley 0% Other 1% Wouldn't vote 6% Undecided 16%
Quinnipiac University Margin of error: ± 4.6% Sample size: 459	March 6–9, 2015	Hillary Clinton; 53%	Elizabeth Warren; 15%	Joe Biden 8% Bernie Sanders 2% Martin O’Malley 1% Jim Webb 1% Other 2% Wouldn't vote 3% Undecided 15%

== Results ==
2016 Democratic Party's presidential nominating process in Connecticut – Summary of results –
Candidate	Popular vote		Estimated delegates		
Candidate	Count	Percentage	Pledged	Unpledged	Total
Hillary Clinton	170,045	51.80%	28	15	43
Bernie Sanders	152,379	46.42%	27	0	27
Roque "Rocky" De La Fuente	960	0.29%	0	0	0
Uncommitted	4,871	1.48%	0	1	1
Total	328,255	100%	55	16	71

=== Results by county ===
County	Clinton	%	Sanders	%
Fairfield	46,387	61.0%	29,596	39.0%
Hartford	47,823	54.3%	40,183	45.7%
Litchfield	6,643	42.4%	9,022	57.6%
Middlesex	8,498	46.4%	9,829	53.6%
New Haven	38,830	51.7%	36,259	48.3%
New London	10,518	44.5%	13,142	55.5%
Tolland	5,609	39.1%	8,737	60.9%
Windham	3,676	40.7%	5,352	59.3%
Total	170,045	51.8%	152,379	46.4%

== Analysis ==
Clinton managed a five-point-win in Connecticut, a state she had narrowly lost to Barack Obama eight years earlier. She relied on turnout in larger cities, including Hartford (which she won 51–47), New Haven, and Bridgeport. She managed a large win in Greenwich, bolstered by support from more affluent Democrats and won in the New York City suburbs as a whole 59–40. Sanders held Clinton to a narrow margin statewide, thanks to his support in rural areas which he won 63–37.

In terms of demographics, Clinton won the African American vote 69–30, older voters 62–35, and the votes of women 57–41. Clinton also won women with children 55–44, and women without children 58–40. Sanders won the youth vote by an overwhelming margin of 66–34, the votes of men 55–43, and won the Caucasian vote (74% of the electorate) by a narrow 50–48 margin. Sanders won among voters with an income of less than 50k and 100k, with Clinton winning more affluent voters.

In terms of political ideology, Clinton won liberals 52–48 and moderates/conservatives 53–43. Clinton won Democrats 60–39 but lost self-identified independents to Sanders 74–23.

Clinton's stance on gun control resonated with voters in the wake of the Sandy Hook Elementary School Shooting in Newtown, Connecticut.
