= 2016 Utah Democratic presidential caucuses =

- March 22, 2016

Candidate	Bernie Sanders	Hillary Clinton
Home state	Vermont	New York
Delegate count	27	6
Popular vote	62,992	16,166
Percentage	79.21%	20.33%
Election results by county.
Sanders
50 – 60%
60 – 70%
70 – 80%
80 – 90%
100%

The 2016 Utah Democratic presidential caucuses took place on March 22 in the U.S. state of Utah as one of the Democratic Party's primaries ahead of the 2016 presidential election.

On the same day, the Democratic Party held another caucus in Idaho and a primary in Arizona, while the Republican Party held primaries in two states, including their own Utah caucuses, plus in American Samoa.

== Opinion polling ==
Poll source	Date	1st	2nd	3rd	Other
Caucus results	March 24, 2016	Bernie Sanders; 79.21%	Hillary Clinton; 20.33%		Other; 0.46%
Dan Jones & Associates Margin of error: ± 7% Sample size: 250	March 8–15, 2016	Bernie Sanders; 52%	Hillary Clinton; 44%		
Dan Jones & Associates Margin of error: ± ? Sample size: 625	February 10–15, 2016	Hillary Clinton; 51%	Bernie Sanders; 44%		
SurveyUSA Margin of error: ± 7.2% Sample size: 188	January 6–13, 2016	Hillary Clinton; 50%	Bernie Sanders; 40%		Other/Undecided 10%
Dan Jones & Associates Margin of error: ± 3.9% Sample size: 624	November 5–14, 2015	Hillary Clinton; 54%	Bernie Sanders; 34%	Martin O'Malley 3%	Don't Know 5%
Dan Jones & Associates Margin of error: ? Sample size: ?	September 8–17, 2015	Bernie Sanders; 31%	Hillary Clinton; 30%	Joe Biden; 20%	Other/Undecided 19%
Dan Jones & Associates Margin of error: ± ? Sample size: ?	July 14–21, 2015	Hillary Clinton; 50%	Bernie Sanders; 30%	Joe Biden; 12%	Other/Undecided 8%
Dan Jones & Associates Margin of error: ± ? Sample size: ?	March 3–5, 2015	Hillary Clinton; 56%	Elizabeth Warren; 25%	Joe Biden; 4%	Other/Undecided 15%

== Results ==
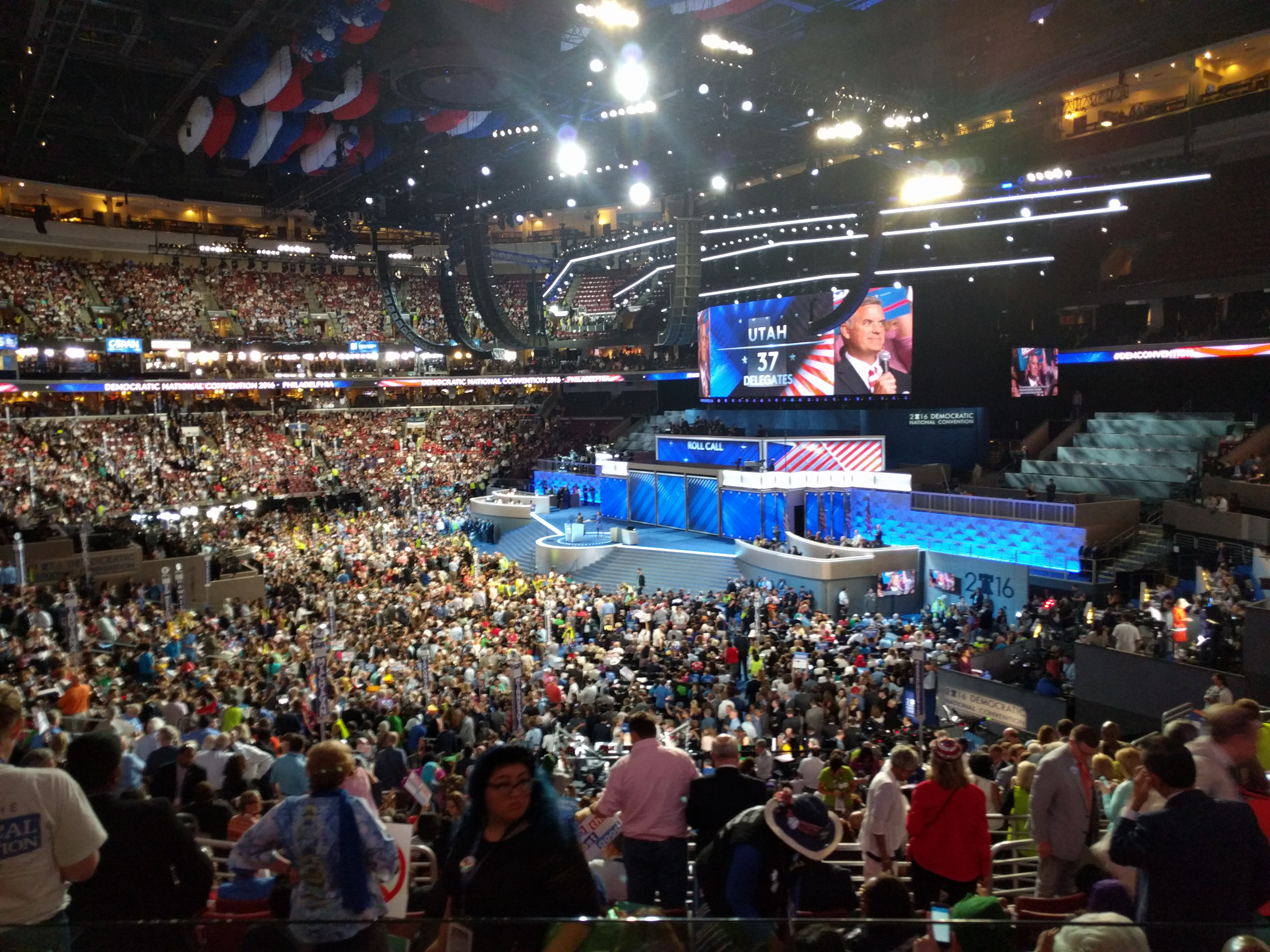
Utah delegation participates in the roll call vote at the 2016 Democratic National Convention

Utah Democratic caucuses, March 22, 2016
Candidate	Popular vote		Estimated delegates		
Candidate	Count	Percentage	Pledged	Unpledged	Total
Bernie Sanders	62,992	79.21%	27	2	29
Hillary Clinton	16,166	20.33%	6	2	8
Others	34	0.04%			
Uncommitted	334	0.42%	0	0	0
Total	79,526	100%	33	4	37

== Analysis ==
Sanders defeated Clinton by a landslide margin in Utah's caucus, winning almost 80 percent of the vote to Clinton's 20 percent. Sanders had held several rallies in Utah and spent $300,000 on TV advertising ahead of the state's caucuses, as well as those in Idaho and Arizona that were held on the same day. Though Clinton had been endorsed by some of the most prominent Democrats in Utah, such as then-Mayor of Salt Lake County Ben McAdams, she did not compete in the state as much as Sanders did. Turnout in the Utah caucus was unusually high, with some caucus sites needing to print extra ballots after running out multiple times. Sanders' victory in Utah was seen as part of a trend in which he tended to do better in whiter states and in those that held caucuses rather than primaries.
