= 2016 Nebraska Democratic presidential caucuses and primary =

2016 Nebraska Democratic presidential caucuses
- March 5, 2016

Candidate	Bernie Sanders	Hillary Clinton
Home state	Vermont	New York
Delegate count	15	10
Popular vote	19,120	14,340
Percentage	57.14%	42.86%
County results
Sanders
50 – 60%
60 – 70%
70 – 80%
Clinton
50 – 60%
60 – 70%
70 – 80%
>90%
Tie/No Votes
50%
No Votes

The 2016 Nebraska Democratic presidential caucuses took place on March 5 in the U.S. state of Nebraska as one of the Democratic Party's primaries ahead of the 2016 presidential election.

On the same day, Democratic primaries were held in Kansas and in Louisiana, while the Republican Party held primaries in four states. The Republican Party and Libertarian Party Nebraska primaries were held on May 10.

== Results ==
Democratic presidential caucuses

Nebraska Democratic caucuses, March 5, 2016
Candidate	Popular vote		Estimated delegates		
Candidate	Count	Percentage	Pledged	Unpledged	Total
Bernie Sanders	19,120	57.14%	15	1	16
Hillary Clinton	14,340	42.86%	10	3	13
Uncommitted	—N/a		0	1	1
Total	33,460	100%	25	5	30

Democratic presidential primary (non-binding)
The Nebraska Democratic primary was held on May 10, 2016. The primary does not bind delegates. Delegates were bound by the caucuses on March 5, 2016.

Nebraska Democratic primary, May 10, 2016
Candidate	Popular vote		Estimated delegates		
Candidate	Count	Percentage	Pledged	Unpledged	Total
Hillary Clinton	42,692	53.08%	—N/a		
Bernie Sanders	37,744	46.92%	—N/a		
Total	80,436	100%	—N/a		

== Analysis ==
Bernie Sanders beat Hillary Clinton by a wide margin in Nebraska (as Barack Obama had done in the state eight years earlier). The victory showcased his strength in Great Plains states and in the farm belt, as well as in states that held caucus contests. Sanders won victories in the two biggest cities: Omaha and Lincoln, winning a commanding victory in populous Douglas County. He also swept most of the rural, mostly white and deeply conservative counties of the state, including those in the Nebraska Panhandle and the Rainwater basin which are among the most radically conservative areas of the nation.

== See also ==
- 2016 Nebraska Republican presidential primary
