= 2016 Democrats Abroad presidential primary =

- March 1–8, 2016

Candidate	Bernie Sanders	Hillary Clinton
Home state	Vermont	New York
Delegate count	9	4
Popular vote	23,779	10,689
Percentage	68.79%	30.92%
- Election results by country. Hillary Clinton Bernie Sanders Results grouped with other countries in the same region Sanders prevailed in all areas (Americas, Asia-Pacific and EMEA)

The 2016 Democrats Abroad presidential primary took place on March 1–8, 2016. E-mail, fax, and postal voting were carried out from January 11 to March 8, while in-person voting took place from March 1–8. Results were released on March 21.

== Global presidential primary ==
Voters may only vote once for a presidential candidate, either through Democrats Abroad, or through their home state. Those who vote in the Democrats Abroad Global Presidential Primary may continue to participate in their home state's primary or caucus for all other candidates for the United States Senate and United States House of Representatives, and also for state and local elections and ballot measures, but they cannot vote twice for a presidential candidate.

== Candidates ==
Four candidates and an "uncommitted" option were printed on the Global Presidential Primary ballot PDF file, in the following name and sorting format:

Key:	Withdrew prior to contest

Candidates
Hillary Clinton
Roque "Rocky" De La Fuente
Martin J. O'Malley
Bernie Sanders
uncommitted

== Forum ==
A "Global Town Hall" online videoconference was held on February 21. The Sanders and Clinton campaigns participated. De La Fuente never appeared on the list of participants, and O'Malley withdrew from the race after the Iowa caucus on February 1.

The Clinton campaign was represented by Jake Sullivan and Madeleine Albright as Clinton was absent from the town hall and attended a private fundraiser instead.

The Sanders campaign was represented by Bernie Sanders himself.

== Local gatherings ==
Wellington, New Zealand cast the "First in the World" votes at midnight on Super Tuesday, March 1. A total of 28 ballots were cast: 21 for Sanders, 6 for Clinton, and 1 spoiled ballot.

In Singapore, Democrats Abroad held a voting session on March 7, hosting a Super Tuesday presentation by KKR Director of Asia Pacific Public Affairs, Steven Okun, who under President Bill Clinton had served as Deputy General Counsel at the Department of Transportation.

== Voting centers ==
A number of cities hosted walk-in voting centers, and an official list of locations and open hours were made available as of February 6.

Australia

- Canberra (ACT Chapter)
- Sydney (NSW Chapter)
- Melbourne (VIC Chapter)

Austria

- Vienna

Belgium

- Brussels

Canada

- Port Maitland, Nova Scotia (Atlantic Chapter)
- Calgary (Calgary Chapter)
- Burlington (Hamilton Chapter)
- Hamilton (Hamilton Chapter)
- Kitchener/Waterloo (Hamilton Chapter)
- London (London Chapter)
- Montreal (Montreal Chapter)
- Fort Erie (Niagara Region Chapter)
- Niagara Falls (Niagara Region Chapter)
- Toronto (Toronto Chapter)
- Vancouver (Vancouver Chapter)
- Victoria (Victoria Chapter)

Chile

- Santiago

Republic of China

- Taipei

Costa Rica

- Escazú
- Grecia
- Pérez Zeledón
- Quepos
- San José

Czech Republic

- Prague

Denmark

- Copenhagen

Dominican Republic

- Bani
- Santiago de los Caballeros
- Santo Domingo

France

- Avignon (Avignon Chapter)
- Bordeaux (Bordeaux Chapter)
- Aix-en-Provence (Marseille Chapter)
- Marseille (Marseille Chapter)
- Caen (Normandy Chapter)
- Paris
- Grenoble (Rhone Alps Chapter)
- Nice (Riviera Chapter)
- Strasbourg (Strasbourg Chapter)
- Toulouse (Toulouse Chapter)

Germany

- Berlin (Berlin Chapter)
- Frankfurt (Frankfurt Chapter)
- Göttingen (Göttingen Chapter)
- Hamburg (Hamburg Chapter)
- Heidelberg (Heidelberg Chapter)
- Landstuhl (Kaiserslautern Chapter)
- Munich (Munich Chapter)
- Nuremberg (Munich Chapter)
- Augsburg (Munich Chapter)
- Cologne/Bonn (NRW Chapter)
- Düsseldorf (NRW Chapter)
- Stuttgart (Stuttgart Chapter)
- Wiesbaden (Wiesbaden/Mainz Chapter)

Greece

- Athens

Guatemala

- La Antigua

Hong Kong

- Hong Kong

Hungary

- Budapest

India

- Bangalore
- Kolkata
- Mumbai
- New Delhi

Ireland

- Dublin
- Galway

Italy

- Florence (Florence Chapter)
- Milan (Milan Chapter)
- Naples (Rome Chapter)
- Rome (Rome Chapter)

Japan

- Nagoya
- Osaka (Kansai Chapter)
- Tokyo (Kanto Chapter)

Luxembourg

- Luxembourg City

Mexico

- Puerto Vallarta (Costa Banderas Chapter)
- Ajijic (Lake Chapala Chapter)
- Mazatlan (Mazatlan Chapter)
- Mexico City
- San Miguel de Allende (San Miguel de Allende Chapter)

Netherlands

- Amsterdam
- The Hague

New Zealand

- Auckland
- Wellington

Norway

- Oslo

Panama

- Panama City

Peru

- Lima

Philippines

- Ortigas, Metro Manila

Portugal

- Cascais
- Lisbon

Russia

- Moscow

Singapore

- Singapore

Spain

- Barcelona (Barcelona Chapter)
- Madrid (Madrid Chapter)

Sweden

- Stockholm (Stockholm Chapter)
- Gothenburg (Western Sweden Chapter)
- Halmstad (Western Sweden Chapter)
- Uddevalla (Western Sweden Chapter)

Switzerland

- Geneva
- Zurich

Thailand

- Bangkok
- Chiang Mai (Chiang Mai Chapter)
- Pattaya (Pattaya and Eastern Seaboard Chapter)

United Kingdom

- Cambridge (Cambridge Chapter)
- London
- Oxford (Oxford Chapter)
- Edinburgh (Scotland Chapter)
- St. Andrews (Scotland Chapter)

Ukraine

- Kyiv

United Arab Emirates

- Abu Dhabi
- Dubai

Vietnam

- Ho Chi Minh City

=== Provisional results ===
Provisional results were the ballot counts for individual walk-in voting centers. Ballots sent by post, fax, and e-mail were not included.

Provisional Results
Date	Location	Sanders	Clinton	Total	Sanders in %	Clinton in %
March 1	Canada – Vancouver East Side	88	44	132	66.7	33.3
March 1	Costa Rica – Escazú	20	6	26	76.9	23.1
March 1	Denmark – Copenhagen	160	53	213	75.1	24.9
March 1	France – Grenoble	35	6	41	85.4	14.6
March 1	France – Marseille	31	23	54	57.4	42.6
March 1	Germany – Munich	83	50	133	62.4	37.6
March 1	Guatemala – La Antigua	61	53	114	53.5	46.5
March 1	Ireland – Dublin	98	37	135	72.6	27.4
March 1	Japan – Tokyo	94	14	108	87.0	13.0
March 1	Luxembourg – Luxembourg City	40	25	65	61.5	38.5
March 1	New Zealand – Wellington	21	6	27	77.8	22.2
March 1	Spain – Barcelona	85	36	121	70.2	29.8
March 1	Spain – Madrid	323	107	430	75.1	24.9
March 1	Sweden – Gothenburg	60	20	80	75.0	25.0
March 1	Switzerland – Geneva	112	104	216	51.9	48.1
March 1	Canada – Vancouver West Side	181	65	246	73.6	26.4
March 1	United Kingdom – Cambridge	82	48	130	63.1	36.9
March 1	United Kingdom – Edinburgh	231	62	293	78.8	21.2
March 1	United Kingdom – London	387	243	630	61.4	38.6
March 1	United Kingdom – Oxford	85	49	134	63.4	36.6
March 2	Costa Rica – Grecia	33	15	48	68.8	31.3
March 2	France – Rhone-Alps	35	6	41	85.4	14.6
March 2	Thailand – Bangkok	82	55	137	59.9	40.1
March 3	Costa Rica – Pérez Zeledón	32	3	35	91.4	8.6
March 3	Japan – Nagoya	27	1	28	96.4	3.6
March 3	Sweden – Stockholm	69	32	101	68.3	31.7
March 3	Thailand – Pattaya	15	11	26	57.7	42.3
March 4	Costa Rica – Quepos	23	19	42	54.8	45.2
March 4	France – Paris	141	54	195	72.3	27.7
March 4	France – Toulouse	31	13	44	70.5	29.5
March 4	Japan – Nagoya	28	7	35	80.0	20.0
March 4	Thailand – Bangkok	73	32	105	69.5	30.5
March 5	Australia – Canberra	28	16	44	63.6	36.4
March 5	Costa Rica – San José	22	15	37	59.5	40.5
March 5	Germany – Cologne/Bonn	20	10	30	66.7	33.3
March 5	Ireland – Galway	42	26	68	61.8	38.2
March 5	Japan – Tokyo	85	16	101	84.2	15.8
March 5	Spain – Barcelona	169	58	227	74.4	25.6
March 5	Sweden – Stockholm	87	41	128	68.0	32.0
March 5	Switzerland – Zürich	68	44	112	60.7	39.3
March 6	Germany – Düsseldorf	16	4	20	80.0	20.0
March 6	Japan – Osaka	117	10	127	92.1	7.9
March 6	Panama – Panama City	39	20	59	66.1	33.9
March 7	Singapore – Singapore	45	68	113	39.8	60.2
March 8	Japan – Tokyo	109	13	122	89.3	10.7
Overall		3,713	1,640	5,353	69.36	30.64

== Problems ==
=== Voting center cancellation ===
The scheduled March 1 voting location in Ho Chi Minh City, Vietnam, was cancelled without prior notice. On March 3, the organizers posted an apology on Facebook.

=== Invalidation of ballots ===
The Global Council of Democrats Abroad may be invalidating all ballots from the March 5 voting center in Moscow, Russia. This is due to the event being held at a different location than the location on the official list of voting centers.

=== E-mail voting failure ===
The email system for accepting ballots was down for several hours on March 7, due to the system exceeding its daily bandwidth limit of 4000 MB at FastMail.

== Results ==
Postal mail ballots were to be dated no later than March 8, and were collected until 6 pm local time on March 13. The results of all ballots was scheduled for March 21.

Democrats Abroad will send 21 delegates (13 pledged, 8 unpledged/superdelegates) to the 2016 Democratic National Convention. Each of the 8 unpledged delegates will cast a 1/2 vote, for a total of 4 delegate votes (21 pledged and unpledged delegates, 17 delegate votes).

The results were released on March 21

Democrats Abroad primary results – March 21, 2016
Candidate	Popular vote		Estimated delegate votes		
Candidate	Count	Percentage	Pledged	Unpledged	Total
Bernie Sanders	23,779	68.79%	9	1	10
Hillary Clinton	10,689	30.92%	4	2	6
Uncommitted	75	0.22%	0	1	1
Martin O'Malley (withdrawn)	21	0.06%	0	0	0
Rocky De La Fuente	6	0.02%	0	0	0
Total	34,570	100%	13	4	17
Source: The Green Papers

=== Results by country/region ===
Region	Sanders	Clinton	O'Malley	De La Fuente	Uncommitted	Total	Percent of total
Afghanistan	5	2	0	0	0	7	0.02%
Americas NCC*	323	104	0	0	0	427	1.24%
Argentina	67	20	1	0	0	88	0.25%
Asia-Pacific NCC*	531	242	1	0	2	776	2.24%
Australia	635	237	1	0	0	873	2.53%
Austria	286	122	1	0	0	409	1.18%
Belgium	227	150	0	0	0	377	1.09%
Brazil	101	33	0	0	0	134	0.39%
Cambodia	52	12	0	0	0	64	0.19%
Canada	2171	1087	2	0	12	3272	9.46%
Chile	110	45	0	0	0	155	0.45%
Republic of China	303	60	0	0	1	364	1.05%
Colombia	64	18	0	0	0	82	0.24%
Costa Rica	239	91	1	0	0	331	0.96%
Czech Republic	403	99	0	0	0	502	1.45%
Denmark	358	89	0	0	1	448	1.30%
Dominican Republic	53	350	0	0	0	403	1.17%
Egypt	41	5	0	0	0	46	0.13%
EMEA NCC**	577	145	0	0	1	723	2.09%
France	1825	1058	6	0	12	2901	8.39%
Germany	2103	805	1	1	7	2917	8.44%
Greece	117	93	0	0	0	210	0.61%
Guatemala	108	65	0	0	1	174	0.50%
Hong Kong	213	137	0	0	1	351	1.02%
Hungary	92	35	0	0	0	127	0.37%
India	137	60	0	0	0	197	0.57%
Indonesia	75	25	0	0	0	100	0.29%
Ireland	356	156	0	0	1	513	1.48%
Israel	249	160	0	0	3	412	1.19%
Italy	577	269	0	0	2	848	2.45%
Japan	1178	176	0	0	2	1356	3.92%
Lebanon	29	6	0	0	0	35	0.10%
Luxembourg	65	45	0	0	1	111	0.32%
Mexico	848	535	0	2	3	1388	4.02%
Netherlands	621	290	0	0	1	912	2.64%
New Zealand	476	63	0	0	0	539	1.56%
Nigeria	1	4	0	0	0	5	0.01%
Norway	328	102	0	0	2	432	1.25%
Panama	107	43	0	0	0	150	0.43%
Peru	86	24	0	0	0	110	0.32%
Philippines	79	59	0	1	0	139	0.40%
Portugal	39	23	0	0	0	62	0.18%
Russian Federation	48	17	0	0	0	65	0.19%
Singapore	107	149	1	0	2	259	0.75%
South Africa	57	43	0	0	0	100	0.29%
South Korea	682	52	0	0	1	735	2.13%
Spain	1295	405	0	1	5	1706	4.93%
Sweden	513	202	0	0	2	717	2.07%
Switzerland	447	319	0	0	2	768	2.22%
Thailand	681	235	0	0	2	918	2.66%
Turkey	126	37	0	0	0	163	0.47%
Ukraine	30	11	0	0	0	41	0.12%
United Arab Emirates	541	334	2	0	3	880	2.55%
United Kingdom	2874	1726	4	1	5	4610	13.34%
Vietnam	123	15	0	0	0	138	0.40%
TOTAL	23,779	10,689	21	6	75	34,570	
Percent	68.79%	30.92%	0.06%	0.02%	0.22%	100.00%	

* NCC = Non-Country Committee

** EMEA = Europe, Middle East, and Africa

== See also ==
- Democratic Party presidential primaries, 2016
