= 2016 Indiana Democratic presidential primary =

- May 3, 2016

Candidate	Bernie Sanders	Hillary Clinton
Home state	Vermont	New York
Delegate count	44	39
Popular vote	335,074	303,705
Percentage	52.46%	47.54%
Election results by county.
Sanders
50 – 60%
60 – 70%
Clinton
50 – 60%
Tie
50%

The 2016 Indiana Democratic presidential primary took place on May 3 in the U.S. state of Indiana as one of the Democratic Party's primaries ahead of the 2016 presidential election.

The Republican Party held their own Indiana primary on the same day. Other primaries were not held that day.

== Opinion polling ==
List of polls
Main article: Indiana Democratic primary, 2016

Delegate count: 83 Pledged, 9 Unpledged Winner: Bernie Sanders
Primary date: May 3, 2016

Poll source	Date	1st	2nd	Other
Official Primary Results	May 3, 2016	Bernie Sanders; 52.5%	Hillary Clinton; 47.5%	
ARG Margin of error: ± 5% Sample size: 400	April 27–28, 2016	Hillary Clinton; 51%	Bernie Sanders; 43%	Others / Undecided; 6%
NBC/WSJ/Marist Margin of error: ± 3.9% Sample size: 645	April 26–28, 2016	Hillary Clinton; 50%	Bernie Sanders; 46%	Others / Undecided; 4%
IPFW/Mike Downs Center Margin of error: ± 4.9% Sample size: 400	April 13–27, 2016	Hillary Clinton; 55%	Bernie Sanders; 40%	Others / Undecided; 5%
IPFW/Downs Center Margin of error: ± 4.9% Sample size: 400	April 18–23, 2016	Hillary Clinton; 54%	Bernie Sanders; 41%	Others / Undecided; 5%
CBS/YouGov Margin of error: ± 8.2% Sample size: 439	April 20–22, 2016	Hillary Clinton; 49%	Bernie Sanders; 44%	Others / Undecided; 7%
FOX News Margin of error: ± 4% Sample size: 603	April 18–21, 2016	Hillary Clinton; 46%	Bernie Sanders; 42%	Others / Undecided; 12%
WTHR News Margin of error: ± 4.47% Sample size: 500	April 18–21, 2016	Hillary Clinton; 48%	Bernie Sanders; 45%	Others / Undecided; 7%

== Results ==
Indiana Democratic primary, May 3, 2016
Candidate	Popular vote		Estimated delegates		
Candidate	Count	Percentage	Pledged	Unpledged	Total
Bernie Sanders	335,074	52.46%	44	0	44
Hillary Clinton	303,705	47.54%	39	7	46
Uncommitted	—N/a		0	2	2
Total	638,779	100%	83	9	92

== Analysis ==
Sanders notched a five-percentage point upset win in Indiana, despite not leading in a single poll ahead of the primary. He won men 57–43, tied women with Clinton 50-50, beat Clinton 68-32 among voters under the age of 45, and won a resounding 59–41 victory with white voters, who made up 71% of the Democratic electorate in Indiana. He also won self-identified Independents 72-28 and won across all income levels. Clinton performed best with African Americans who she won 74–26, and older voters who she won 60–40.

Sanders performed well statewide in Indiana, winning most of the rural counties. He performed well in Marion County, winning 51-49 according to exit polls. Marion contains the state capital and largest city of Indianapolis, and the Indianapolis Suburbs which he won 56–44. Sanders won Northeast Indiana, which is anchored in Allen County by Fort Wayne. Sanders carried East Central Indiana and Northern Indiana. He carried St. Joseph County which contains South Bend and University of Notre Dame by a wide margin, likely thanks to his support from younger voters. He also won Monroe County which contains the city of Bloomington which is home to Indiana University. Sanders also won Vanderburgh County which contains Evansville as well as Vigo County which contains Terre Haute.

Clinton won Lake County in Northwest Indiana (a region she won by a narrow 51–49) which contains the heavily African American city of Gary and is a part of the Chicago Metropolitan Area, and performed well in Southern Indiana along the Ohio River with neighboring Kentucky.
