= 2016 North Dakota Democratic presidential caucuses =

- June 7, 2016

Candidate	Bernie Sanders	Hillary Clinton
Home state	Vermont	New York
Delegate count	13	5
Popular vote	253	101
Percentage	64.21%	25.63%
Election results by state legislative district
Sanders
50 – 60%
60 – 70%
70 – 80%
80 – 90%
100%
Clinton
50 – 60%
60 – 70%
70 – 80%
Tie
40 – 50%
50%

The 2016 North Dakota Democratic presidential caucuses were held on June 7 in the U.S. state of North Dakota as one of the Democratic Party's primaries ahead of the 2016 presidential election.

The Republican Party did not hold a caucus; Republican presidential delegates were chosen at a party convention on April 2–3. However, Democratic Party's primaries in California, Montana, New Jersey, New Mexico and South Dakota were held the same day, as were Republican primaries in the same five states.

== Opinion polling ==
No polls were conducted.

== Results ==
North Dakota Democratic caucuses, June 7, 2016
Candidate	District delegates		State delegates		
Candidate	Count	Percentage	Pledged	Unpledged	Total
Bernie Sanders	253	64.21%	13	1	14
Hillary Clinton	101	25.63%	5	1	6
Uncommitted	40	10.15%	0	0	0
Total	394	100%	18	5	23

== Analysis ==
As he had in other caucus states and among other largely white, rural electorates in the farm belt, Sanders won a large victory over Hillary Clinton in North Dakota. Sanders won in the cities of Fargo, Bismarck, and Grand Forks where he had campaigned heavily, and he also swept most other rural, conservative counties in the state. The caucus did not require participants to register before voting due to the state's small population.

Analyst for the New York Times Nate Cohn summarized the results: "A Sanders win in North Dakota isn’t much of a surprise. It’s a caucus state and it’s a small state, worth just 18 delegates. He’s won every caucus since Nevada."
