= 2016 Kansas Democratic presidential caucuses =

- March 5, 2016

Candidate	Bernie Sanders	Hillary Clinton
Home state	Vermont	New York
Delegate count	23	10
Popular vote	26,637	12,593
Percentage	67.90%	32.10%
- Congressional district results Bernie Sanders

The 2016 Kansas Democratic presidential caucuses took place on March 5 in the U.S. state of Kansas as one of the Democratic Party's primaries ahead of the 2016 presidential election.

On the same day, Democratic primaries were held in Louisiana and in Nebraska, while the Republican Party held primaries in four states including their own Kansas caucuses.

== Opinion polling ==
Poll source	Date	1st	2nd	3rd	Other
Caucus results	March 5, 2016	Bernie Sanders; 67.9%	Hillary Clinton; 32.1%	Uncommitted; 0.0%	
Fort Hays State University Margin of error: ± 5.0; Sample size: 440	February 19–26, 2016	Hillary Clinton; 33%	Bernie Sanders; 23%		Undecided 44%
Suffolk University Margin of error: ± ? Sample size: 118	September 27–30, 2014	Hillary Clinton; 62%	Elizabeth Warren; 14%	Joe Biden; 4%	Andrew Cuomo 4%, Martin O'Malley 1%, Other 2%, Undecided/Refused 14%

== Results ==
Kansas Democratic caucuses, March 5, 2016
Candidate	District delegates		Estimated delegates		
Candidate	Count	Percentage	Pledged	Unpledged	Total
Bernie Sanders	26,637	67.90%	23	0	23
Hillary Clinton	12,593	32.10%	10	4	14
Uncommitted	—N/a		0	0	0
Total	39,230	100%	33	4	37

== Analysis ==
As he did throughout most other states that held caucuses, as well as most farm belt and Great Plains states, Bernie Sanders defeated Hillary Clinton by a two-to-one margin in Kansas, one of the reddest states in the nation. Sanders ran up big margins in urban areas including Kansas City, Lawrence, Topeka, and Wichita, but also won in very rural areas. He won all four congressional districts in the state, never dipping below 60% of the vote. His worst showing was in Kansas's Third Congressional District which borders Missouri, where he received 62% of the vote.
