= 2016 American Samoa Republican presidential caucuses =

- March 22, 2016
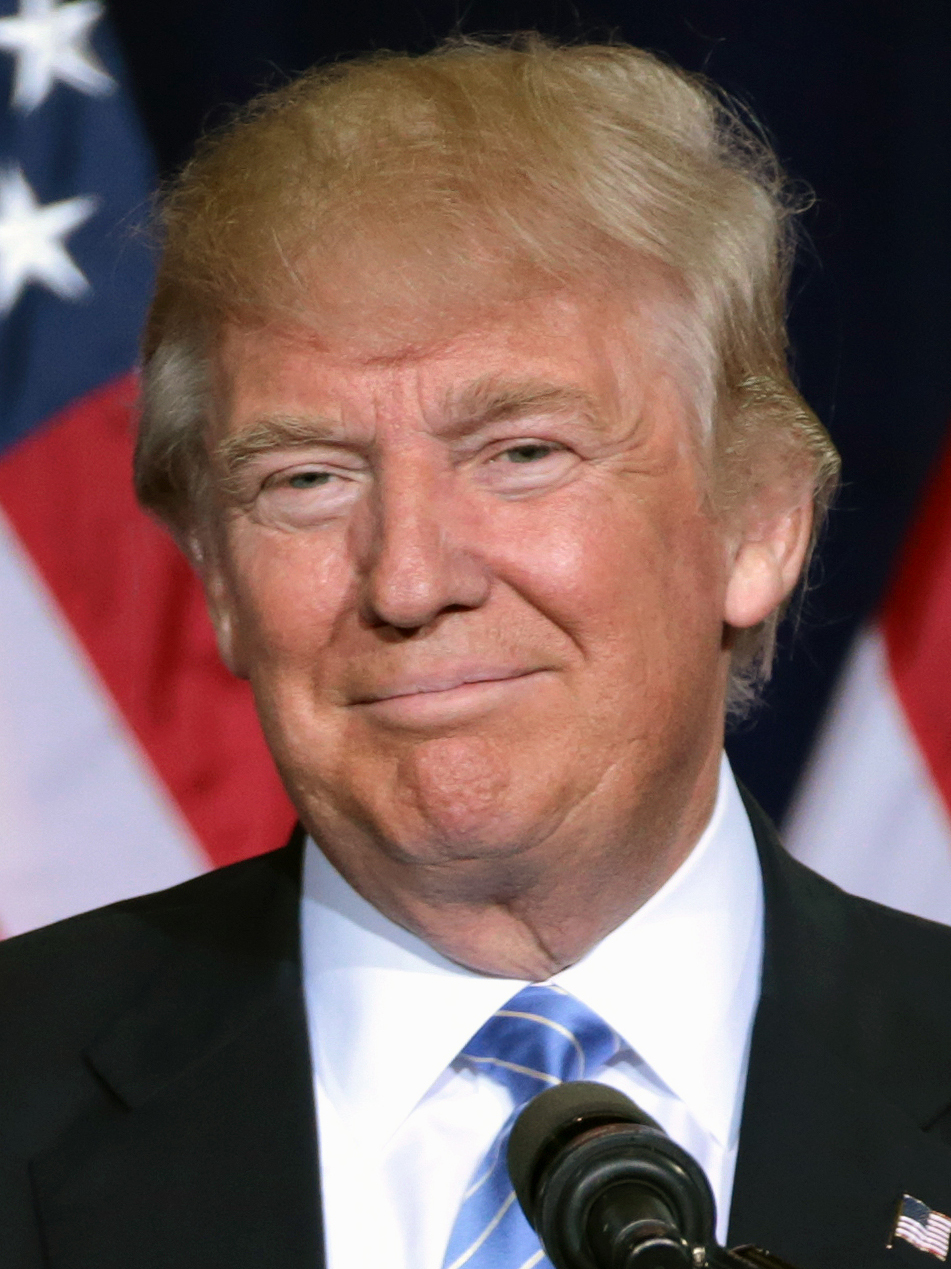
Candidate	Donald Trump
Home state	New York
Delegate count	9

The 2016 American Samoa Republican presidential caucuses took place on March 22 in the U.S. territory of American Samoa as one of the Republican Party's primaries ahead of the 2016 presidential election.

On the same day, the Republican Party held a primary in Arizona and caucuses in Utah, while the Democratic Party held primaries and caucuses in three states. The Democratic Party's own Democratic Samoa caucus has already been held on March 1, 2016.

== Results ==
American Samoa Republican territorial caucus, March 22, 2016
Candidate	Votes	Percentage	Actual delegate count		
Candidate	Votes	Percentage	Bound	Unbound	Total
Donald Trump			0	9	9
Ted Cruz			0	0	0
Unprojected delegates:			0	0	0
Total:			0	9	9
Source: The Green Papers

The delegates were originally elected as unbound but all 9 delegates declared their support for Trump after Trump became the presumptive nominee.

=== Delegates ===
1. Utu Abe Malae (Republican Party Chairman) (automatically a delegate)
2. Su’a Carl Schuster (National Committeeman) (automatically a delegate)
3. Congresswoman Aumua Amata (National Committeewoman) (automatically a delegate)
4. Vice Chairman John Raynar (Trump's local campaign chair)
5. Taulapapa William Sword
6. Charles Warren (Cruz's local campaign chairman)
7. Party Treasurer Tina Ioane
8. Ann Longnecker
9. Joan Galea'i Holland

==== Alternates ====
1. Jim Longnecker
2. Salote Schuster
3. Atonio Ioane
4. Lucia Bartley
5. John Laumatia
6. Roy Hall
