= 2016 Democratic Party presidential primaries =

Selection of the Democratic Party nominee

- February 1 to June 14, 2016

4,763 delegate votes to the Democratic National Convention 2,382 delegate votes needed to win

Candidate	Hillary Clinton	Bernie Sanders
Home state	New York	Vermont
Delegate count	2,842	1,865
Contests won	34	23
Popular vote	16,917,853 (Note: Does not include popular vote totals from Iowa, Maine, Nevada, North Dakota, Washington, Wyoming, or non-binding primaries)	13,210,550
Percentage	55.2%	43.1%

First place by initial pledged delegate allocation
Hillary Clinton
Bernie Sanders
First place by convention roll call
Hillary Clinton
Bernie Sanders
Tie
Previous Democratic nominee
Barack Obama
Democratic nominee
Hillary Clinton

Presidential primaries and caucuses were organized by the Democratic Party to select the 4,051 delegates to the 2016 Democratic National Convention held July 25–28 and determine the nominee for President in the 2016 United States presidential election. The elections took place within all fifty U.S. states, the District of Columbia, five U.S. territories, and Democrats Abroad and occurred between February 1 and June 14, 2016. This was the first time the Democratic primary had nominated a woman for president.

Six major candidates entered the race starting April 12, 2015, when former Secretary of State and New York Senator Hillary Clinton formally announced her second bid for the presidency. She was followed by Vermont Senator Bernie Sanders, former Governor of Maryland Martin O'Malley, former Governor of Rhode Island Lincoln Chafee, former Virginia Senator Jim Webb and Harvard Law Professor Lawrence Lessig. A draft movement was started to encourage Massachusetts Senator Elizabeth Warren to seek the presidency. Warren declined to run, as did incumbent Vice President Joe Biden. Webb, Chafee, and Lessig withdrew prior to the February 1, 2016, Iowa caucuses.

Clinton won Iowa by the closest margin in the history of the state's Democratic caucus to date. O'Malley suspended (Note: In US elections, suspending a campaign allows candidates to cease active campaigning while still legally raising funds to pay off their debts.) his campaign after a distant third-place finish, leaving Clinton and Sanders as the only two candidates. The race turned out to be more competitive than expected, with Sanders decisively winning New Hampshire, while Clinton subsequently won Nevada and won a landslide victory in South Carolina. Clinton then secured numerous important wins in each of the nine most populous states including California, New York, Florida, and Texas, while Sanders scored various victories in between. He then laid off a majority of staff after the New York primary and Clinton's multi-state sweep on April 26. On June 6, the Associated Press and NBC News stated that Clinton had become the presumptive nominee after reaching the required number of delegates, including both pledged and unpledged delegates (superdelegates), to secure the nomination. In doing so, she became the first woman to ever be the presumptive nominee of any major political party in the United States. On June 7, Clinton secured a majority of pledged delegates after winning in the California and New Jersey primaries. President Barack Obama, Vice President Joe Biden and Senator Elizabeth Warren endorsed Clinton on June 9. Sanders confirmed on June 24 that he would vote for Clinton over Donald Trump in the general election and endorsed Clinton on July 12 in Portsmouth, New Hampshire.

On July 22, WikiLeaks published the Democratic National Committee email leak, in which DNC operatives seemed to deride Bernie Sanders' campaign and discuss ways to advance Clinton's nomination, leading to the resignation of DNC chair Debbie Wasserman Schultz and other implicated officials. The leak was allegedly part of an operation by the Russian government to undermine Hillary Clinton. Although the ensuing controversy initially focused on emails that dated from relatively late in the primary, when Clinton was already close to securing the nomination, the emails cast doubt on the DNC's neutrality and, according to Sanders operatives and multiple media commentators, showed that the DNC had favored Clinton since early on. This was evidenced by alleged bias in the scheduling and conduct of the debates, (Note: As far back as 2015, the sharp reduction of the debate schedule, as well as the days and times, had been criticized by multiple rivals as biased in Clinton's favor. The DNC denied bias, claiming to be cracking down on the non-sanctioned debates that proliferated in recent cycles, while leaving the number of officially sanctioned debates the same as in 2004 and 2008. Donna Brazile, who succeeded Debbie Wasserman Schultz as DNC chair after the first batch of leaks, was shown in the emails leaking primary debate questions to the Clinton campaign before the debates were held, although a senior aide to Sanders came to Brazile's defense and tried to downplay the issue.) as well as controversial DNC–Clinton agreements regarding financial arrangements and control over policy and hiring decisions. (Note: Brazile went on to write a book about the primary and what she called "unethical" behavior in which the DNC (after its debt from 2012 was resolved by the Clinton campaign) gave the Clinton campaign control over hirings and press releases, and allegedly helped it circumvent campaign finance regulation. Several Democratic leaders responded that the joint-fundraising agreement was standard, was for the purpose of the general election, and was also offered to the Sanders campaign. However, another agreement that came to light gave the Clinton campaign powers over the DNC well before the primary was decided. Some media commentators noted that the Clinton campaign's level of influence on staffing decisions was indeed unusual and could have ultimately influenced factors such as the debate schedule.) Other media commentators have disputed the significance of the emails, arguing that the DNC's internal preference for Clinton was not historically unusual and did not affect the primary enough to sway the outcome, as Clinton received over 3 million more popular votes and 359 more pledged delegates than Sanders. The controversies ultimately led to the formation of a DNC "unity" commission to recommend reforms in the party's primary process.

On July 26, 2016, the Democratic National Convention officially nominated Clinton for president and a day later, Virginia Senator Tim Kaine for vice president. Clinton and Kaine went on to lose to the Republican ticket of Donald Trump and Mike Pence in the general election.

== Candidates ==
=== Nominee ===
Democratic nominee for the 2016 presidential election
Candidate	Born	Most recent position	Home state	Campaign Announcement date	Total pledged delegates	Popular vote	Contests won (Note: According to popular vote or pledged delegate count (not counting superdelegates); see below for detail.)	Running mate	Ref.
Hillary Clinton	October 26, 1947 (age 68); Chicago, Illinois	U.S. Secretary of State (2009–2013)	New York	Campaign April 12, 2015; FEC filing Secured nomination: June 6, 2016	2205 / 4051 (54%)	16,917,853	34; AL, AR, AS, AZ, CA, CT, DC, DE, FL, GA, GU, IA, IL, KY, LA, MA, MD, MO, MP, MS, NC, NJ, NM, NV, NY, OH, PA, PR, SC, SD, (Note: Pledged delegates split evenly between Sanders and Clinton.); TN, TX, VA, VI	Tim Kaine	

=== Withdrew at the convention ===
Major candidates who withdrew at the 2016 Democratic National Convention
Candidate	Born	Most recent position	Home state	Campaign announced	Lost Nomination	Campaign	Total pledged delegates	Popular vote	Contests won	Ref.
Bernie Sanders	September 8, 1941 (age 74); Brooklyn, New York	U.S. Senator from Vermont (2007–present)	Vermont	April 30, 2015	July 26, 2016 (endorsed Clinton)	(Campaign • Positions); FEC filing	1846 / 4051 (46%)	13,210,550	23; AK, CO, DA, HI, ID, IN, KS, ME, MI, MN, MT, NE, (Note: Hillary Clinton won the non-binding Nebraska Democratic Primary.); NH, ND, OK, OR, RI, UT, VT, WA, (Note: Hillary Clinton won the non-binding Washington Democratic Primary.); WI, WV, WY	

=== Withdrew during the primaries ===
Major candidates who withdrew during the 2016 Democratic Party presidential primaries
Candidate	Born	Most recent position	Home state	Campaign announced	Campaign suspended	Campaign	Ref
Martin O'Malley	January 18, 1963 (age 53); Washington, D.C.	Governor of Maryland (2007–2015)	Maryland	May 31, 2015	February 1, 2016 (endorsed Clinton)	(Campaign • Website); FEC filing	

=== Withdrew before the primaries ===
Major candidates who withdrew before the 2016 Democratic Party presidential primaries
Candidate	Born	Most recent position	Home state	Campaign announced	Campaign suspended	Campaign	Ref
Lincoln Chafee	March 26, 1953 (age 62); Providence, Rhode Island	Governor of Rhode Island (2011–2015)	Rhode Island	June 3, 2015	October 23, 2015 (endorsed Clinton)	(Campaign • Website); FEC filing	
Jim Webb	February 9, 1946 (age 69); Saint Joseph, Missouri	U.S. Senator from Virginia (2007–2013)	Virginia	July 7, 2015	October 20, 2015	(Campaign • Website); FEC filing Amended FEC filing (party changed to Independent)	
Lawrence Lessig	June 3, 1961 (age 54); Rapid City, South Dakota	Professor at Harvard Law School (2009–2016)	Massachusetts	September 9, 2015	November 2, 2015	(Campaign • Website); FEC filing	

=== Other candidates' results ===
The following candidates were frequently interviewed by news channels and were invited to forums and candidate debates. For reference, Clinton received 16,849,779 votes in the primaries.

Candidates in this section are sorted by number of votes received
Martin O'Malley	Lawrence Lessig	Jim Webb	Lincoln Chafee
Governor of Maryland (2007–2015)	Harvard law professor (2009–2016)	U.S. Senator from Virginia (2007–2013)	Governor of Rhode Island (2011–2015)
Campaign	Campaign	Campaign	Campaign
110,423 votes	4 write-in votes in New Hampshire	2 write-in votes in New Hampshire	none

Other candidates participated in one or more state primaries without receiving major coverage or substantial vote counts.

== Timeline ==
=== Background ===
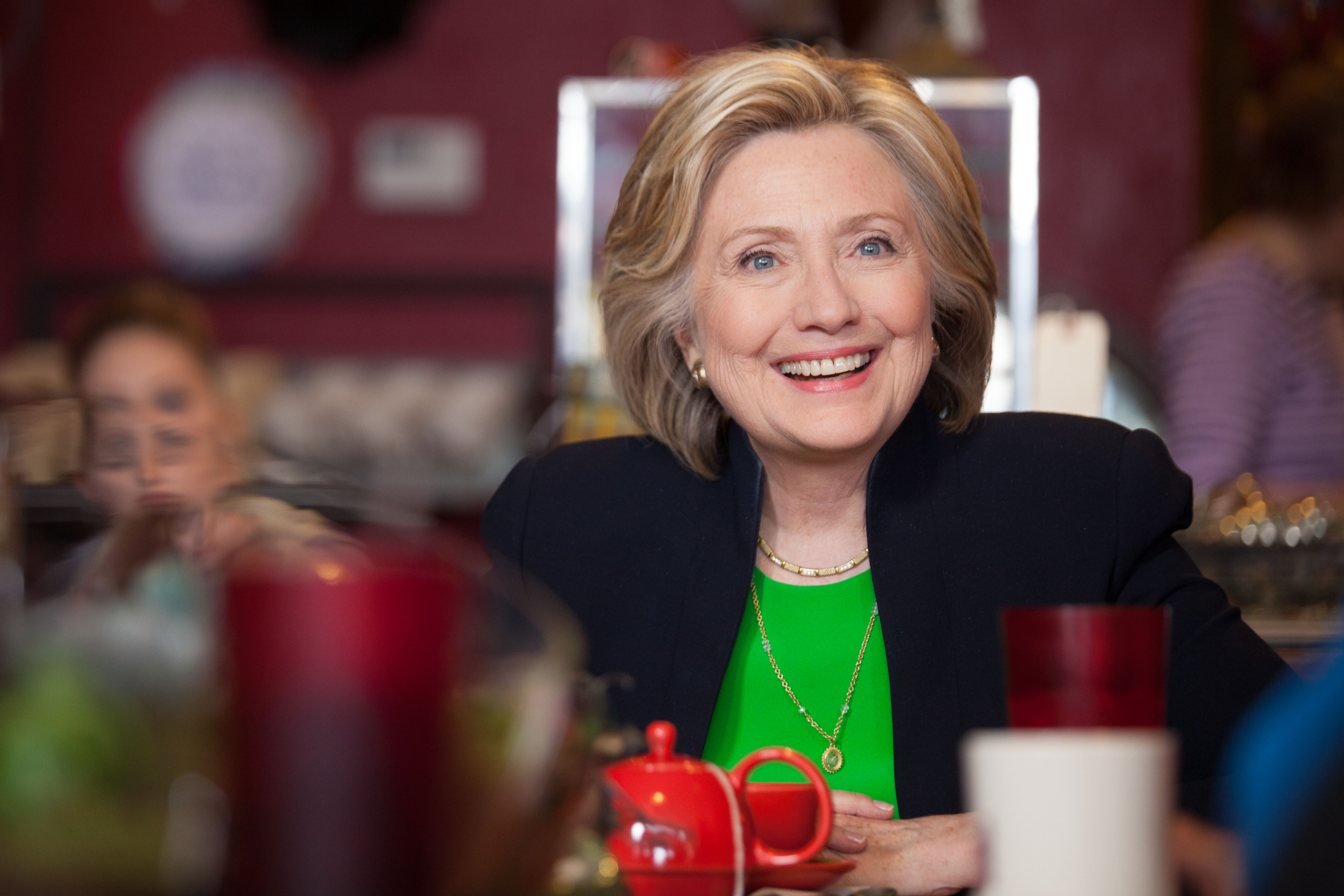
Former Secretary of State Hillary Clinton, April 2015

In the weeks following the re-election of President Obama in the 2012 presidential election, media speculation regarding potential candidates for the Democratic presidential nomination in the 2016 presidential election began to circulate. The speculation centered on the prospects of Clinton, then-Secretary of State, making a second presidential bid in the 2016 election. Clinton had previously served as a U.S. Senator for New York (2001–09) and was the First Lady of the U.S. (1993–2001). A January 2013 Washington Post–ABC News poll indicated that she had high popularity among the American public.

This polling information prompted numerous political pundits and observers to anticipate that Clinton would mount a second presidential bid in 2016, entering the race as the early front-runner for the Democratic nomination. From the party's liberal left wing came calls for a more progressive candidate to challenge what was perceived by many within this segment as the party's establishment. Elizabeth Warren quickly became a highly touted figure within this movement as well as the object of a draft movement to run in the primaries, despite her repeated denials of interest in doing so.

The MoveOn.org campaign 'Run Warren Run' announced that it would disband on June 8, 2015, opting to focus its efforts toward progressive issues. The draft campaign's New Hampshire staffer, Kurt Ehrenberg, had joined Sanders' team and most of the remaining staffers were expected to follow suit. Given the historical tendency for sitting vice presidents to seek the presidency in election cycles in which the incumbent president is not a candidate, there was also considerable speculation regarding a potential presidential run by incumbent Vice President Joe Biden, who had previously campaigned for the Democratic presidential nomination in the election cycles of 1988 and 2008.

This speculation was further fueled by Biden's own expressions of interest in a possible run in 2016. However, on October 21, 2015, speaking from a podium in the Rose Garden with his wife and President Obama by his side, Biden announced his decision not to enter the race, as he was still dealing with the loss of his elder son, Beau, who died months earlier at the age of 46. Biden became the nominee for the Democratic Party four years later in the 2020 presidential election where he became the 46th President of the United States after defeating incumbent president Donald Trump in the general election.

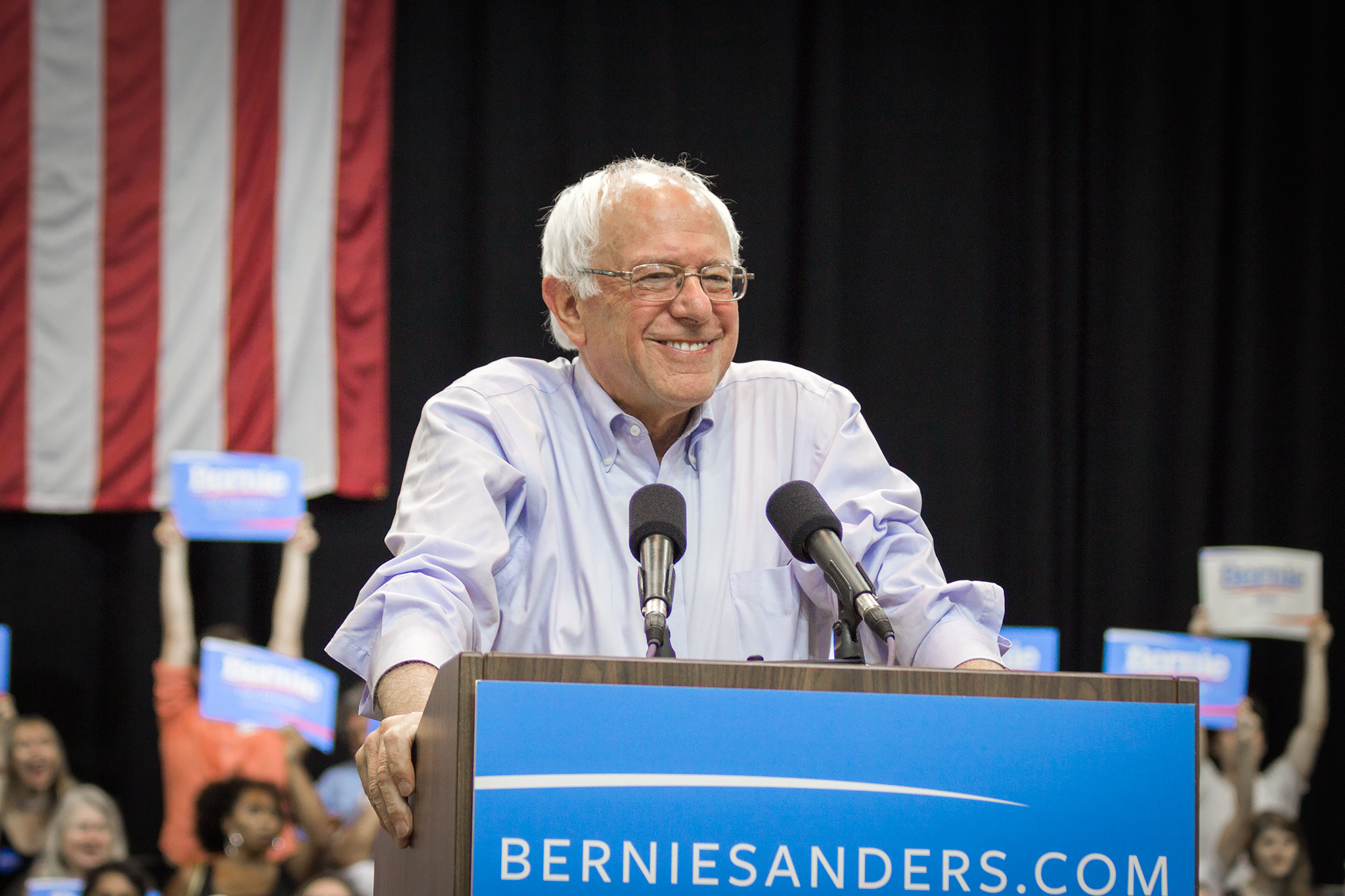
Senator Bernie Sanders during a rally, July 2015

On May 26, 2015, Sanders officially announced his run as a presidential candidate for the Democratic nomination, after an informal announcement on April 30 and speculation since early 2014. Sanders had previously served as Mayor of Burlington, Vermont (1981–89), Vermont's sole U.S. Representative (1991–2007) and Vermont's junior Senator (2007–present). He emerged as the biggest rival to Hillary Clinton in the Democratic primaries, backed by a strong grassroots campaign and a social media following.

In November 2014, Jim Webb, a former U.S. Senator who had once served as the U.S. Secretary of the Navy during the Reagan administration, announced the formation of an exploratory committee in preparation for a possible run for the Democratic presidential nomination. This made Webb the first major potential candidate to take a formal action toward seeking the party's 2016 nomination.

In June 2015, Lincoln Chafee, former Governor and Senator of Rhode Island, announced his campaign. Chafee had been a Republican while serving in the senate, and an Independent while serving as Governor. He formed an exploratory committee on April 3. Chafee endorsed Barack Obama in 2008 and served as co-chair of his re-election campaign in 2012.

Martin O'Malley, former Governor of Maryland as well as a former Mayor of Baltimore, made formal steps toward a campaign for the party's nomination in January 2015 with the hiring and retaining of personnel who had served the previous year as political operatives in Iowa – the first presidential nominating state in the primary elections cycle – as staff for his political action committee (PAC). O'Malley had started the "O' Say Can You See" PAC in 2012 which had, prior to 2015, functioned primarily as fundraising vehicles for various Democratic candidates, as well as for two 2014 ballot measures in Maryland. With the 2015 staffing moves, the PAC ostensibly became a vehicle for O'Malley – who had for several months openly contemplated a presidential bid – to lay the groundwork for a potential campaign for the party's presidential nomination.

In August 2015, Lawrence Lessig unexpectedly announced his intention to enter the race, promising to run if his exploratory committee raised $1 million by Labor Day. After accomplishing this, Lessig formally announced his campaign. He described his candidacy as a referendum on electoral reform legislation, prioritizing a single issue: the Citizen Equality Act of 2017, a proposal that couples campaign finance reform with other laws aimed at curbing gerrymandering and ensuring voting access.

=== Overview ===
Nominee
Ended campaigns
Iowa Caucuses
Super Tuesday
D.C. Primary
Convention 2016

=== February 2016: early primaries ===
Despite being heavily favored in polls issued weeks earlier, Clinton was only able to defeat Sanders in the first-in-the-nation Iowa Caucus by the closest margin in the history of the contest: 49.84% to 49.59%. Clinton collected 700.47 state delegate equivalents to Sanders' 696.92, a difference of one-quarter of a percentage point. This led to speculation that she won due to six coin-toss tiebreakers all resulting in her favor. However, the only challenge to the caucus' results was in a single precinct, which gave Clinton a fifth delegate.

Date	State/territory	Clinton	Sanders
February 1	Iowa	49.8%	49.6%
February 9	New Hampshire	37.7%	60.1%
February 20	Nevada	52.6%	47.3%
February 27	South Carolina	73.4%	26.0%

The victory, which was projected to award her 23 pledged national convention delegates, two more than Sanders, made Clinton the first woman to win the Caucus and marked a clear difference from 2008, where she finished in third place behind Obama and John Edwards. Martin O'Malley suspended his campaign after a disappointing third-place finish with only 0.5% of the state delegate equivalents awarded, leaving Clinton and Sanders the only two major candidates in the race. A week later, Sanders won the New Hampshire primary, receiving 60.1% of the popular vote to Clinton's 37.7%, putting him ahead of Clinton in the overall pledged delegate count by four, and making him the first Jewish candidate of a major party to win a primary. Hillary Clinton's loss in New Hampshire was a regression from 2008, when she defeated Obama, Edwards, and a handful of other candidates including Joe Biden, with 39% of the popular vote.

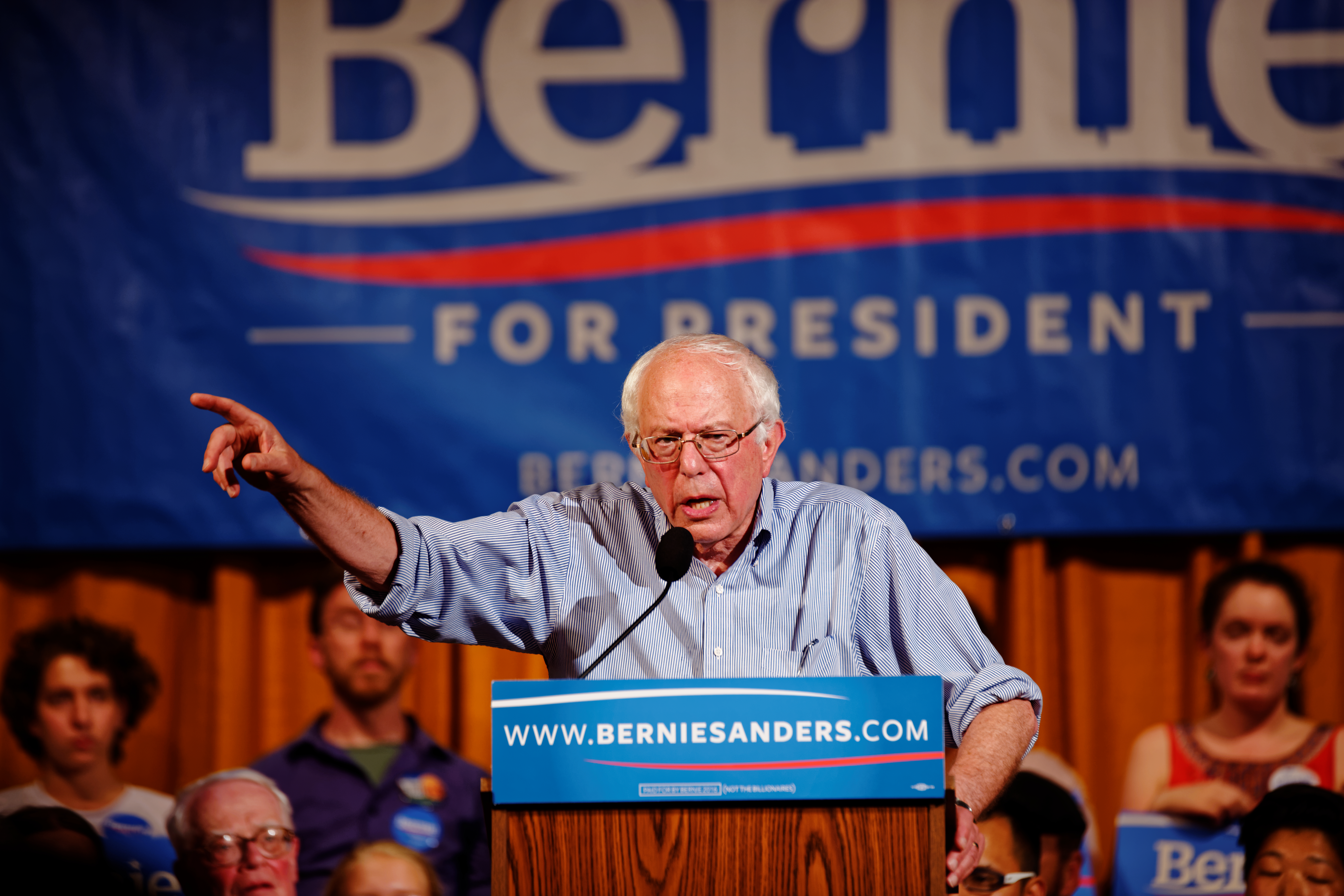
Bernie Sanders speaks in Littleton, New Hampshire.

Sanders' narrow loss in Iowa and victory in New Hampshire generated speculation about a possible loss for Clinton in Nevada, the next state to hold its caucuses on February 20. For her part, Clinton, who had won the state eight years prior, hoped that a victory would allay concerns about a possible repetition of 2008 when she ultimately lost to Obama despite entering the primary season as the favorite for the nomination. Ultimately, Clinton emerged victorious with 52.6% of the county delegates, a margin of victory similar to her performance in 2008. Sanders, who attained 47.3% of the vote, was projected to receive five fewer pledged delegates than Clinton. The result was not promising for the following weekend's primary in South Carolina, more demographically favorable to Clinton than the prior contests. On February 27, Clinton won the South Carolina primary with 73.4% of the vote, receiving a larger percentage of the African American vote than Barack Obama had eight years earlier – 90% to Obama's 80%.

=== March 1, 2016: Super Tuesday ===
Super Tuesday
State/territory	Clinton	Sanders
Alabama	77.8%	19.2%
American Samoa	68.4%	25.7%
Arkansas	66.1%	30.0%
Colorado	40.3%	59.0%
Georgia	71.3%	28.2%
Massachusetts	49.7%	48.3%
Minnesota	38.4%	61.6%
Oklahoma	41.5%	51.9%
Tennessee	66.1%	32.5%
Texas	65.2%	33.2%
Vermont	13.6%	85.7%
Virginia	64.3%	35.2%

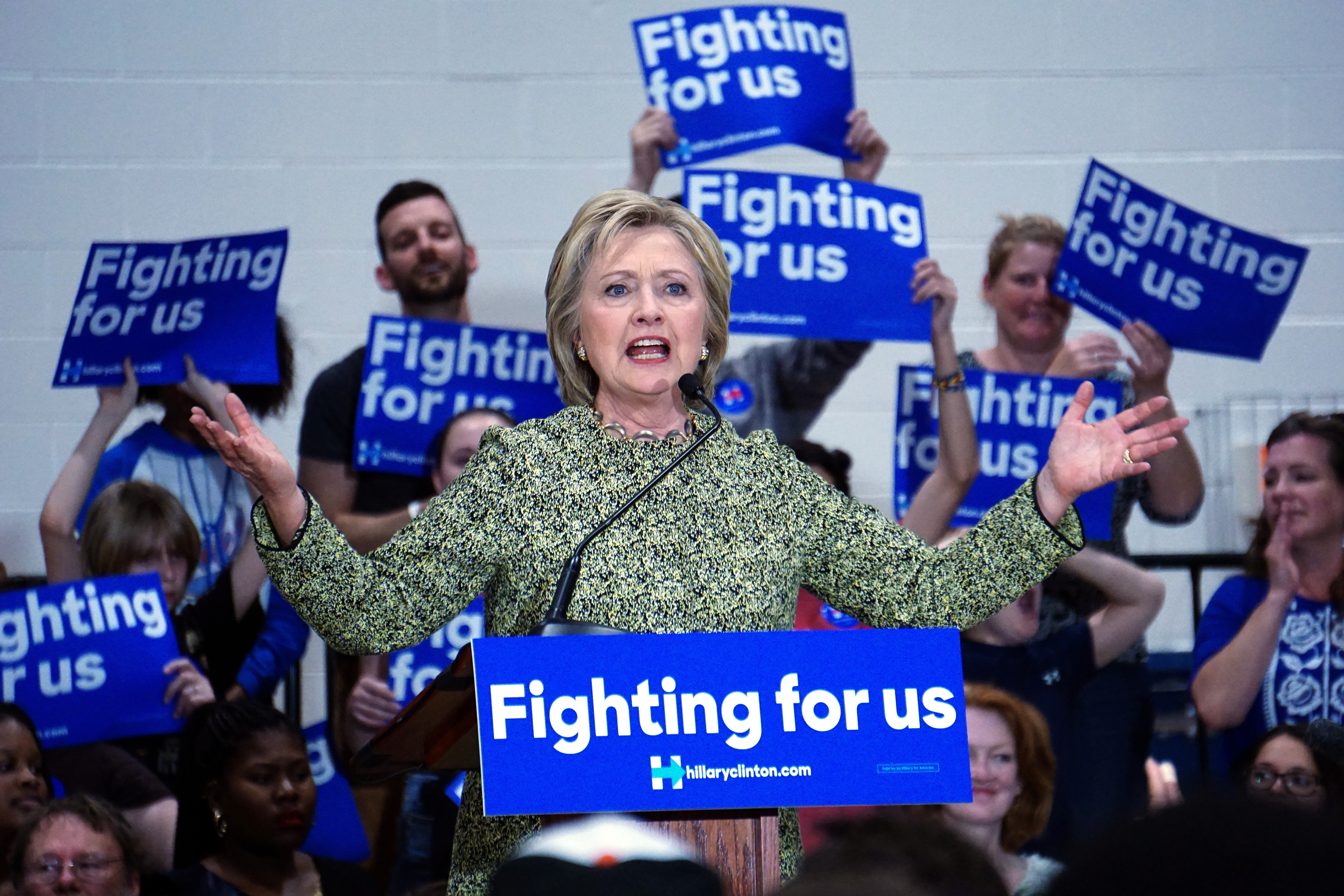
Hillary Clinton during a rally in March 2016

The 2016 primary schedule was significantly different from that of 2008. During that election cycle, many states moved their primaries or caucuses to earlier in the calendar to have greater influence over the race. In 2008, February 5 was the earliest date allowed by the Democratic National Committee, leading 23 states and territories to move their elections to that date, the biggest Super Tuesday to ever take place. For 2016, the calendar was more disparate than it was in 2008, with several groups of states voting on different dates, the most important being March 1, March 15, April 26 and June 7. The day with the most contests was March 1, 2016, in which primaries or caucuses were held in 11 states, including six in the American south, and American Samoa. A total of 865 pledged delegates were at stake.

Clinton secured victories in all of the southern contests except Oklahoma. Her biggest victory of the day came in Alabama, where she won 77.8% of the vote against Sanders' 19.2%. Her most significant delegate prize came from Texas, where she received 65.2% of the vote with strong support from non-white as well as white voters. Collectively, the southern states gave Clinton a net gain of 165 pledged delegates. Apart from the South, Clinton also narrowly defeated Sanders in Massachusetts, as well as winning in the territory of American Samoa.

Sanders scored comfortable wins in the Minnesota and Colorado caucuses and the Oklahoma primary. He won an 85.7%–13.6% landslide in his home state of Vermont – one of only two times either of the two main candidates missed the 15% threshold in a state or territory, with the U.S. Virgin Islands, where Clinton received over 87% of the vote, being the other one. Although the results overall were unfavorable for Sanders, his four wins and narrow loss allowed him to remain in the race in anticipation of more favorable territory in New England, the Great Plains, Mountain States and the Pacific Northwest. At the end of the day, Clinton collected 518 pledged delegates to Sanders' 347, taking her lead to 609–412, a difference of 197 pledged delegates.

=== Mid-March contests ===
Mid-March contests
State/territory	Clinton	Sanders
Florida	64.4%	33.3%
Illinois	50.6%	48.6%
Kansas	32.3%	67.7%
Louisiana	71.1%	23.2%
Maine	35.5%	64.3%
Michigan	48.3%	49.7%
Mississippi	82.5%	16.6%
Missouri	49.6%	49.4%
Nebraska	42.9%	57.1%
North Carolina	54.5%	40.9%
N. Mariana Islands	54.0%	34.4%
Ohio	56.1%	43.1%

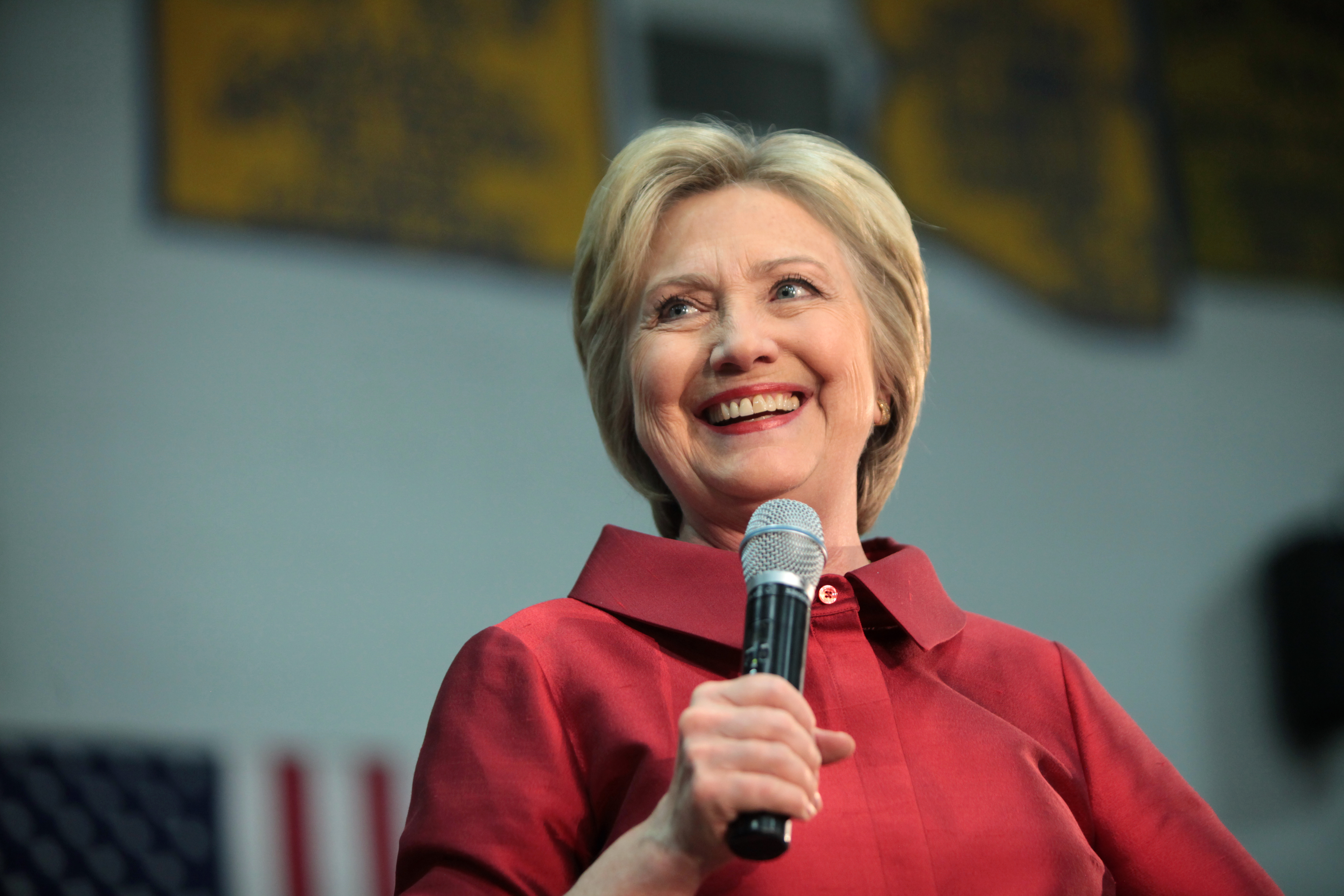
Hillary Clinton speaks in Phoenix, Arizona, in March 2016.

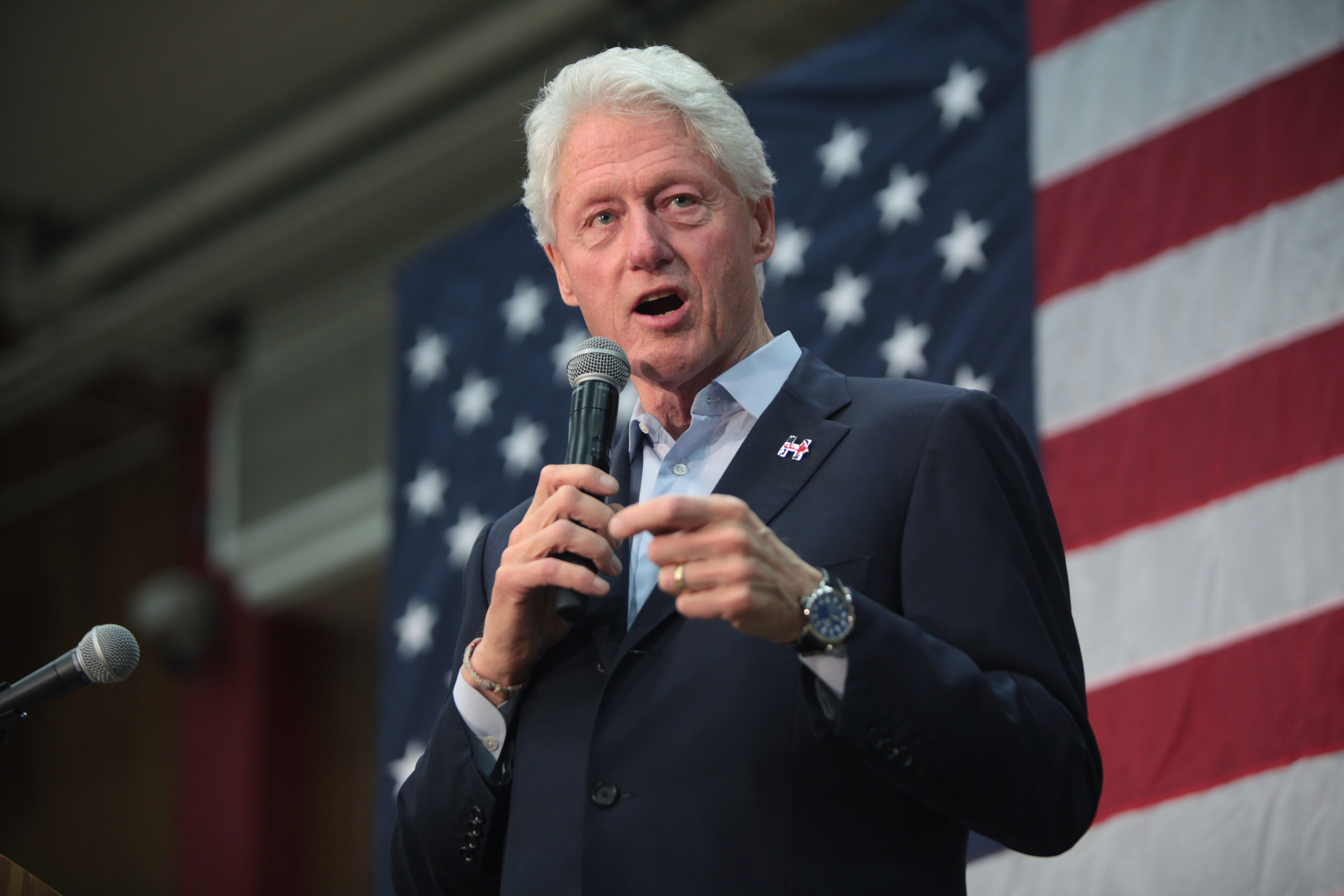
Bill Clinton campaigning for his wife in March 2016

Sanders found more hospitable ground on the weekend of March 5, 2016, winning caucuses in Kansas, Maine and Nebraska by significant margins. Clinton answered with an even larger win in Louisiana's primary, limiting Sanders' net gain for the weekend to only four delegates. Clinton would also win the Northern Mariana Islands caucus, held the following weekend on March 12. Two states had held nominating contests on March 8 – Michigan and Mississippi – with Clinton heavily favored to win both.

Mississippi went for Clinton, as expected, by a landslide margin. The Mississippi primary was the highest vote share Clinton won in any state. However, Sanders stunned by scoring a narrow win in Michigan. Analysts floated a number of theories to explain the failure of the Michigan polling, with most centering on pollsters' erroneous assumptions about the composition of the electorate stemming from the 2008 primary in Michigan not having been contested due to an impasse between the state party and DNC.

Although Clinton expanded her delegate lead, some journalists suggested Sanders' upset might presage her defeat in other delegate-rich Midwestern states, such as Missouri, Ohio and Illinois, who voted a week later on March 15, along with North Carolina and Florida, where Clinton was more clearly favored. Clinton was able to sweep all five primaries, extending her pledged delegate lead by around 100 delegates, although Sanders was able to hold Clinton to narrow margins in her birth-state of Illinois and especially Missouri, where Clinton won by a mere 0.2 points.

Missouri state law allowed for a possible recount had any of the candidates requested it; however, Sanders forwent the opportunity on the basis that it would not significantly affect the delegate allocation. By the end of the evening, Clinton had expanded her pledged delegate lead to more than 320, several times larger than her greatest deficit in the 2008 primary.

=== Late March and early April ===
Late March / Early April contests
State/territory	Clinton	Sanders
Alaska	20.2%	79.6%
Arizona	56.3%	41.4%
Democrats Abroad	30.9%	68.9%
Hawaii	30.0%	69.8%
Idaho	21.2%	78.0%
Utah	20.3%	79.3%
Washington	27.1%	72.7%
Wisconsin	43.1%	56.6%
Wyoming	44.3%	55.7%

Following the March 15 primaries, the race moved to a series of contests more favorable for Sanders. On March 21, the results of the Democrats Abroad primary (held March 1–8) were announced. Sanders was victorious and picked up nine delegates to Clinton's four, closing his delegate deficit by five. Arizona, Idaho and Utah held primaries on March 22, dubbed "Western Tuesday" by media. Despite continued efforts by Sanders to close the gap in Arizona after his surprise win in Michigan, Clinton won the primary with 56.3% of the vote. However, Clinton lost both Idaho and Utah by roughly 60 points, allowing Sanders to close his delegate deficit by 25.

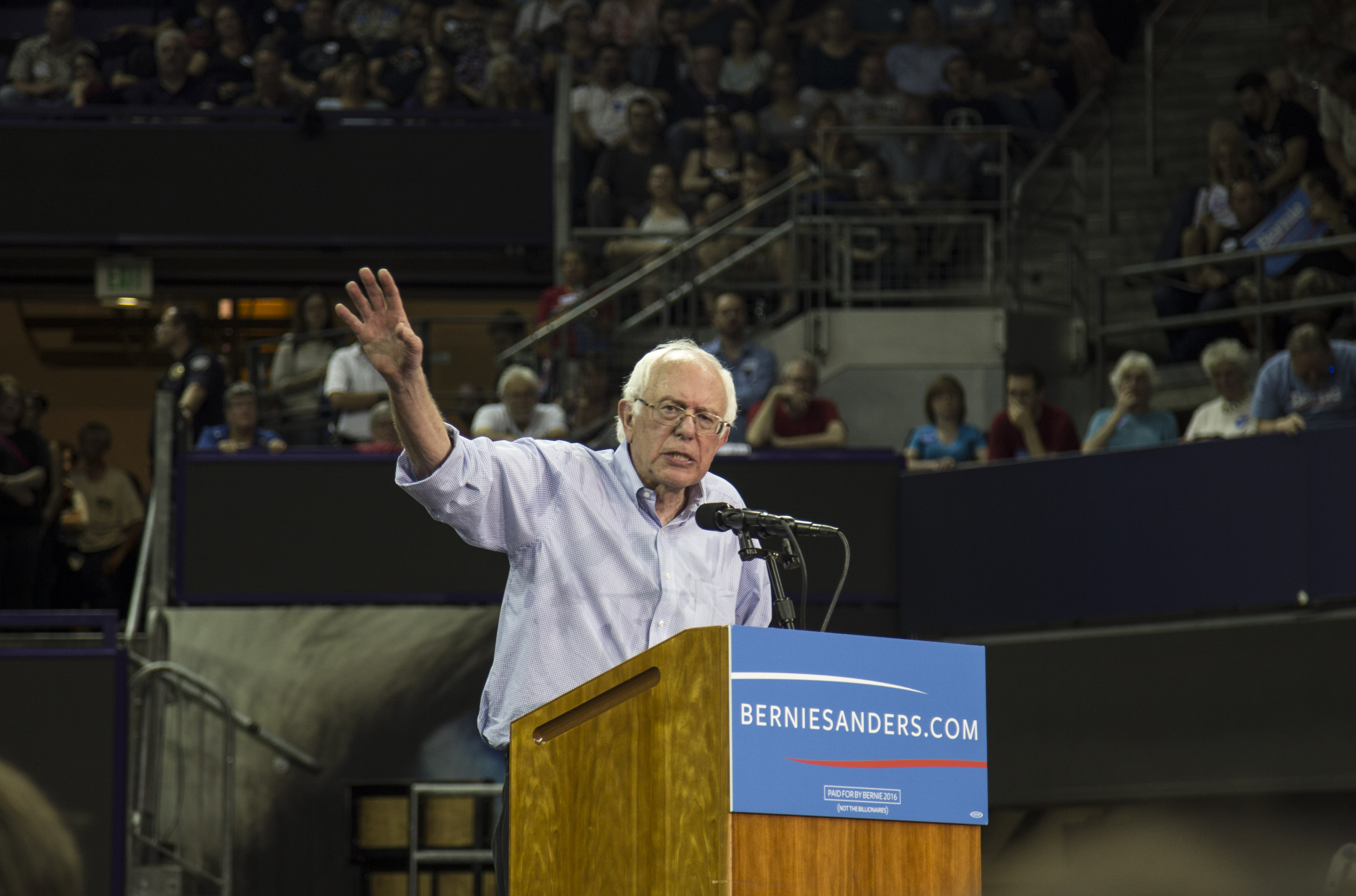
Sanders speaks in Seattle, Washington, March 2016.

The next states to vote were Alaska, Hawaii and Washington on March 26, 2016. All three states were considered as favorable for Sanders, and most political analysts expected him to win them all, given the demographics and Sanders' strong performance in previous caucuses. Sanders finished the day with a net gain of roughly 66 delegates over Clinton. His largest win was in Alaska, where he defeated Clinton with 79.6% of the vote, although the majority of his delegate gain came from the considerably more populous state of Washington, which he won by a 45.6% margin, outperforming then-Senator Obama's 2008 results, when he defeated Clinton 68%–31%.

The Clinton and Sanders campaigns reached an agreement on April 4 for a ninth debate to take place on April 14 (five days before the New York primary) in Brooklyn, New York, which would air on CNN and NY1. On April 5, Sanders won the Wisconsin primary by 13 and 1/2 percentage points, closing his delegate deficit by 10 more. The Wyoming caucuses were held on April 9, which Sanders won with 55.7% of the state convention delegates choosing him; however, Clinton had a stronger showing than expected, given her demographic disadvantage and that she did not campaign personally in the state. Each candidate was estimated to have earned 7 of Wyoming's 14 pledged delegates.

=== Late April and May ===
Late April and May
State/territory	Clinton	Sanders
New York	57.5%	41.6%
Connecticut	51.8%	46.4%
Delaware	59.8%	39.2%
Maryland	62.5%	33.8%
Pennsylvania	55.6%	43.5%
Rhode Island	43.1%	54.7%
Indiana	47.5%	52.5%
Guam	59.5%	40.5%
West Virginia	35.8%	51.4%
Kentucky	46.8%	46.3%
Oregon	42.1%	56.2%

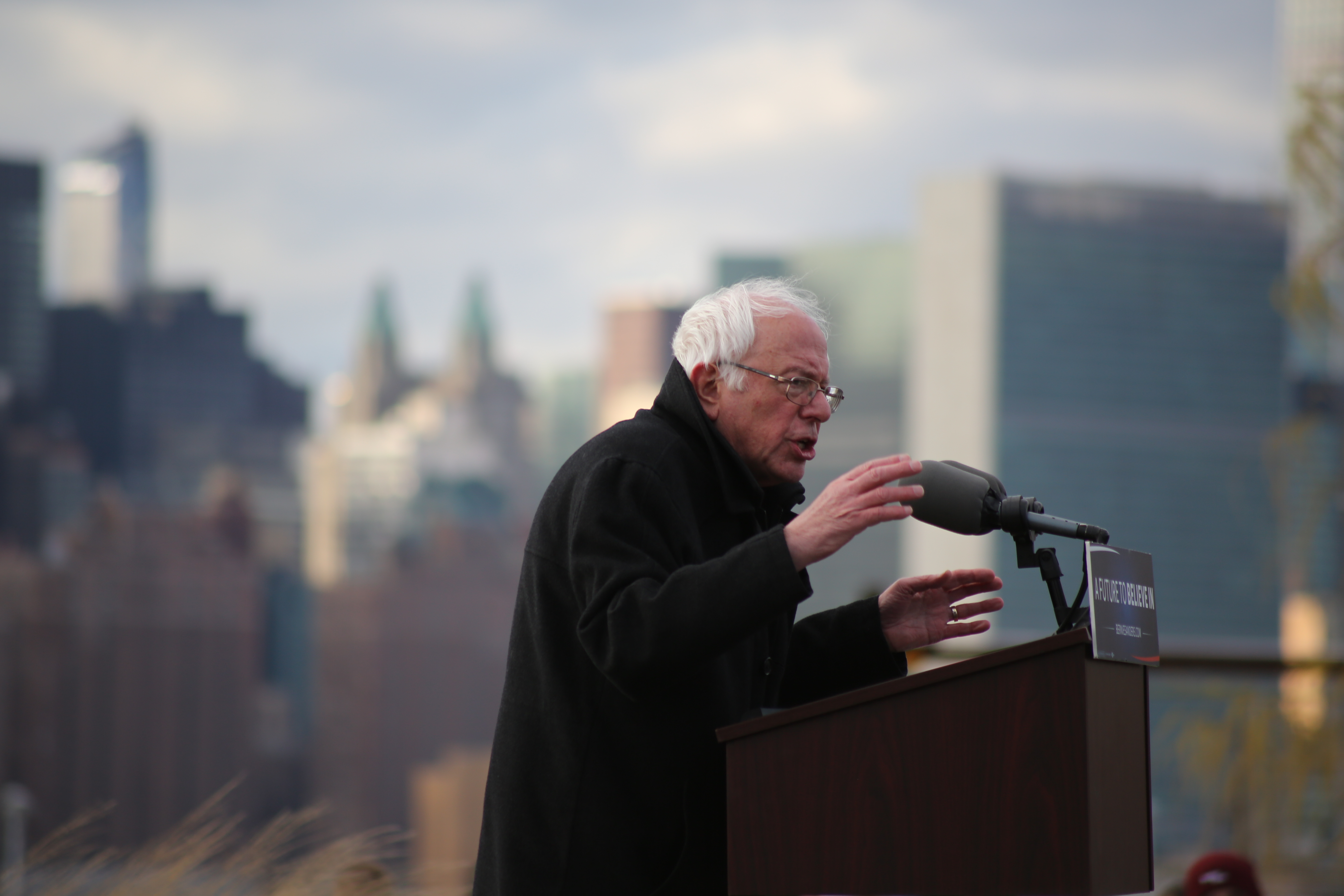
Sanders speaks in Brooklyn, New York, April 2016.

On April 19, Clinton won her home state of New York by 16 points. While Sanders performed well in Upstate New York and with younger voters, Clinton performed well among all other age groups and non-whites, and she won a majority in all boroughs of New York City.

Five Northeastern states held primaries a week later on April 26. The day was dubbed the "Super Tuesday III" or the "Acela Primary" after Amtrak's Acela Express train service that connects these states. Clinton won in Delaware, Maryland, Pennsylvania and Connecticut. Sanders won the Rhode Island primary.

On May 3, Sanders pulled off a surprise victory in the Indiana primary, winning by a five-point margin despite trailing in all the state's polls. Clinton won the Guam caucus on May 7 and, on May 10, she won the non-binding Nebraska primary while Sanders won in West Virginia.

Clinton narrowly won Kentucky on May 17 by half a percentage point and gained one delegate, after heavily campaigning in the state. On the same day, Sanders won his second closed primary in Oregon, gaining nine delegates, a net gain of eight on the day. Clinton won the non-binding Washington primary on May 24.

=== June contests ===
June contests
State/territory	Clinton	Sanders
Virgin Islands	87.1%	12.9%
Puerto Rico	59.7%	37.9%
California	53.1%	46.0%
Montana	44.2%	51.6%
New Jersey	63.3%	36.7%
New Mexico	51.5%	48.5%
North Dakota	25.6%	64.2%
South Dakota	51.0%	49.0%
District of Columbia	78.0%	20.7%

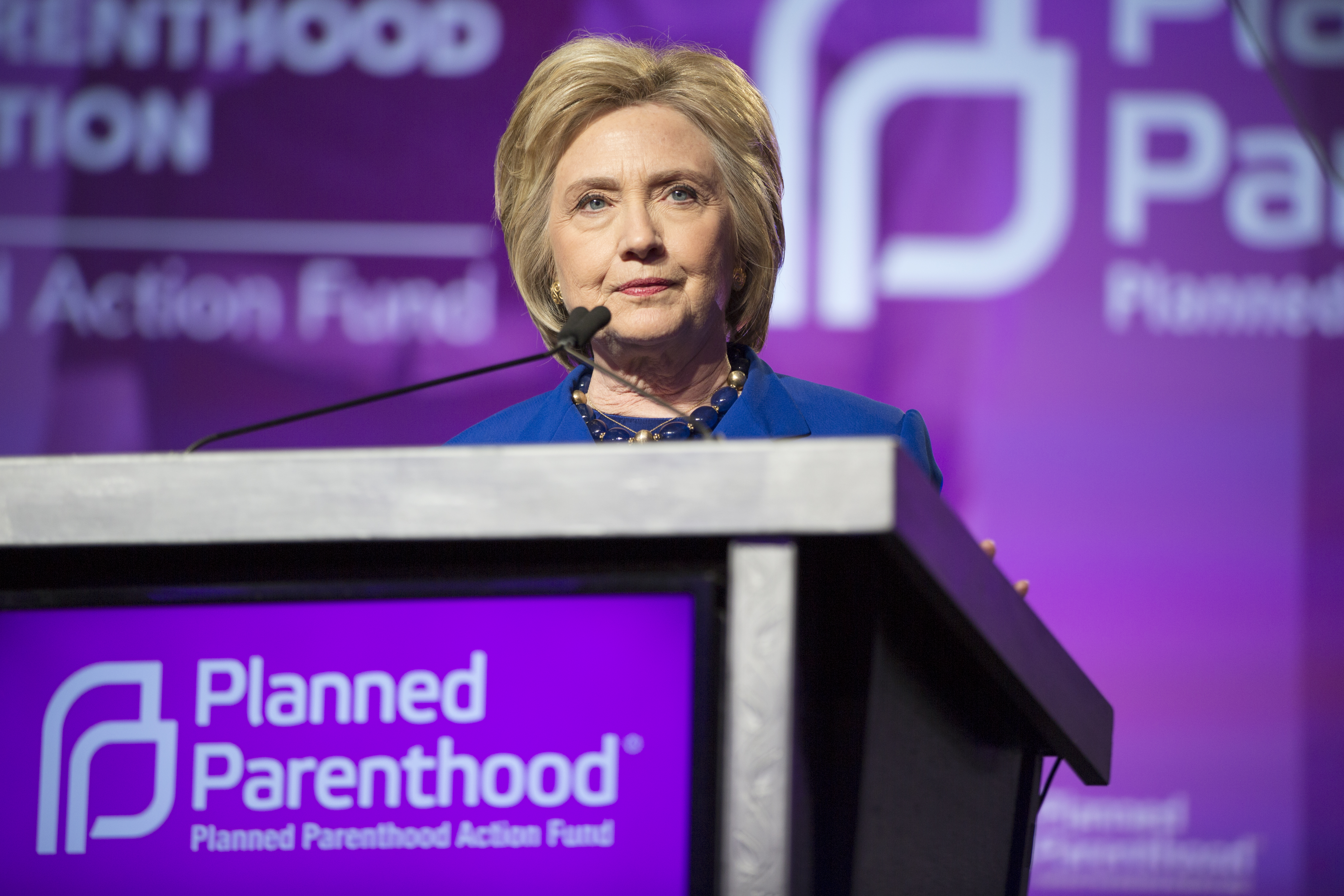
Clinton speaks in Washington, D.C., June 2016.

June contained the final contests of the Democratic primaries, and both Sanders and Clinton invested heavily into winning the California primary. Clinton led the polls in California but some predicted a narrow race. On June 4 and 5, Clinton won two decisive victories in the Virgin Islands caucus and Puerto Rico primary. On June 6, both the Associated Press and NBC News reported that Clinton had sufficient support from pledged and unpledged delegates to become the presumptive Democratic nominee.

Clinton's campaign seemed reluctant to accept the mantle of "presumptive nominee" before all the voting was concluded, while Sanders' campaign stated it would continue to run and accused the media of a "rush to judgement." Six states held their primaries on June 7. Clinton won in California, New Jersey, New Mexico and South Dakota. Sanders won Montana and North Dakota, the latter being the only caucus contest held on that day. Clinton finally declared victory on the evening of June 7, as the results ensured that she had won a majority of the pledged delegates and the popular vote.

Sanders stated he would continue to run for the Democratic Party's nomination in the final primary in the District of Columbia on June 14, which Clinton won. Both campaigns met at a downtown Washington D.C. hotel after the primary. The Sanders campaign said that they would release a video statement on June 16 to clarify the future of Sanders' campaign; the video announced that Sanders looked forward to help Clinton defeat Trump. On July 12, 2016, Sanders endorsed Clinton in Portsmouth, New Hampshire.

=== July 2016: National Convention and email leaks ===
==== Email leaks ====
On July 22, 2016, WikiLeaks released online tens of thousands of messages leaked from the e-mail accounts of seven key DNC staff. Some e-mails showed two DNC staffers discussing the possibility that Sanders' possible atheism might harm him in a general election with religious voters. Others showed a few staffers had expressed personal preferences that Clinton should become the nominee, suggesting that the party's leadership had worked to undermine Bernie Sanders' presidential campaign. Then-DNC chair Debbie Wasserman Schultz called the accusations lies.

The furor raised over this matter escalated to Wasserman Schultz's resignation ahead of the convention, and that of Marshals, Dacey, and Communications Director Luis Miranda afterwards. Following Wasserman Schultz's resignation, then-DNC Vice Chair Donna Brazile took over as interim DNC chairwoman for the convention and remained so until February 2017. In November 2017, Brazile said in her book and related interviews that the Clinton campaign and the DNC had colluded 'unethically' by giving the Clinton campaign control over the DNC's personnel and press releases before the primary in return for funding to eliminate the DNC's remaining debt from 2012 campaign, in addition to using the DNC and state committees to funnel campaign-limitation-exceeding donations to her campaign. Internal memos later surfaced, claiming that these measures were not meant to affect the nominating process despite their timing. At the end of June 2016, it was claimed that "more money [from the Hillary Victory Fund] will be moved to the state parties in the coming months." Brazile later clarified that she claimed the process was 'unethical', but 'not a criminal act'.

DNC officials including chairman Tom Perez pointed out that the same joint-fundraising agreement had been offered to Sanders and applied only to the general election; however, the Clinton campaign also had a second agreement that granted it additional, unusual oversight over hiring and policy, even though the text of the agreement insisted on the DNC's impartiality and focus on the general election. Brazile later denied that the primary was rigged, because "no votes were overturned," but described herself as "very upset" about a DNC–Clinton fundraising agreement. The Washington Post characterized Brazile's eventual argument as: "Clinton exerted too much power but did win the nomination fairly."

==== Russian involvement ====
After the general election, the U.S. intelligence community and the Special Counsel investigation assessed that the leaks were part of a larger interference campaign by the Russian government to cause political instability in the United States and to damage the Hillary Clinton campaign by bolstering the candidacies of Donald Trump, Bernie Sanders, and Jill Stein. The Russian government is alleged to have promoted Sanders beginning in 2015 as a way to weaken or defeat Clinton, who Russian President Vladimir Putin opposed. The influence campaign by the Internet Research Agency targeted Sanders voters through social media and encouraged them to vote for a third-party candidate or abstain from voting. Sanders denounced these efforts and urged his supporters to support Clinton in the general election.

When news of the DNC leak first surfaced in June 2016, the Russian government denied allegations of hacking. WikiLeaks founder Julian Assange also stated that the Russian government was not source of the leak. In July 2018, the special counsel indicted 12 Russian intelligence officers for hacking and leaking the emails.

==== National Convention ====
The 2016 Democratic National Convention was held from July 25–28 at the Wells Fargo Center in Philadelphia, with some events at the Pennsylvania Convention Center. The delegates selected the Democratic presidential and vice-presidential nominees and wrote the party platform. A simple majority of 2,383 delegates was needed to win the presidential nomination. While most of the delegates were bound on the first ballot according to the results of the primaries, a progressively larger number of pledged delegates would have become unbound if the nomination required more than one ballot.

Clinton was nominated on the first ballot by acclamation, although all states were allowed to announce how they would have voted under a typical roll call vote. On July 12, 2016, the Vermont delegates had supported Clinton in Sanders' request. Asking for party unity, he dropped out on July 26, 2016, and announced he would return to the Senate as an independent.

== Campaign finance ==
This is an overview of the money used in the campaign as it is reported to Federal Election Commission (FEC) and released on April 27, 2016. Outside groups are independent expenditure only committees—also called PACs and SuperPACs. Several such groups normally support each candidate, but the numbers in the table are a total of all of them. This means that a group of committees can be shown as technically insolvent, shown in red, even though it is not the case of all of them. The Campaign Committee's debt is shown in red if the campaign is technically insolvent. The source of all the numbers is OpenSecrets. Some spending totals are not available, due to withdrawals before the FEC deadline.

	Campaign committee (as of April 30)				Outside groups (as of May 16)			Total spent	Campaign suspended
	Money raised	Money spent	Cash on hand	Debt	Money raised	Money spent	Cash on hand	Total spent	Campaign suspended
Hillary Clinton	$204,258,301	$174,101,369	$30,156,932	$612,248	$84,815,067	$38,332,454	$46,482,614	$212,433,823	Convention
Bernie Sanders	$227,678,274	$219,695,969	$8,015,274	$898,879	$869,412	$1,069,765	$-200,353	$220,765,734	July 26
Martin O'Malley	$6,073,767	$5,965,205	$108,562	$19,423	$1,105,138	$1,298,967	$-193,829	$7,264,172	February 1
Lawrence Lessig	$1,196,753	N/A	N/A	N/A	$0	$0	$0	N/A	November 2
Jim Webb	$764,992	$558,151	$206,842	$0	$27,092	$31,930	$-4,838	$590,081	October 20
Lincoln Chafee	$418,136	N/A	N/A	N/A	N/A	N/A	N/A	N/A	October 23

== Process ==
The Democratic Party presidential primaries and caucuses are indirect elections in which voters elect delegates to the 2016 Democratic National Convention. These delegates directly elect the Democratic Party's presidential nominee. In some states, the party may disregard voters' selection of delegates, or selected delegates may vote for any candidate at the state or national convention (non-binding primary or caucus). In other states, state laws and party rules require the party to select delegates according to votes, and delegates must vote for a particular candidate (binding primary or caucus).

There were 4,051 pledged delegates and 714 superdelegates in the 2016 cycle. Under the party's delegate selection rules, the number of pledged delegates allocated to each of the 50 U.S. states and Washington, D.C. is determined using a formula based on three main factors:

1. The proportion of votes each state gave to the Democratic candidate in the last three presidential elections (2004, 2008, and 2012)
2. The number of electoral votes each state has in the United States Electoral College.
3. The stage of the primary season when they held their contest. States and territories that held their contests later are given bonus seats.

A candidate must win 2,383 delegates at the national convention, in order to win the 2016 Democratic presidential nomination. For the U.S. territories of Puerto Rico, American Samoa, Guam, the U.S. Virgin Islands and for Democrats Abroad, fixed numbers of pledged delegates are allocated. All states and territories then must have used a proportional representation system, where their pledged delegates were awarded proportionally to the election results.

A candidate must receive at least 15% of the popular vote to win pledged delegates in a state. The current 714 unpledged superdelegates, or "soft" delegates, included members of the United States House of Representatives and Senate, state and territorial governors, members of the Democratic National Committee, and other party leaders. Because of possible deaths, resignations, or the results of intervening or special elections, the final number of these superdelegates may be reduced before the convention.

The Democratic National Committee imposed rules for states that wished to hold early contests in 2016. No state was permitted to hold a primary or caucus in January. Only Iowa, New Hampshire, South Carolina, and Nevada were entitled to February contests. Any state that violated these rules were penalized half its pledged delegates and all its superdelegates to the 2016 convention.

== Schedule and results ==

The following are the results of candidates who won at least one state. These candidates were on the ballots for every state, territory and federal district contest. The results of caucuses did not always have attached preference polls and attendance was extremely limited. The unpledged delegate count did not always reflect the latest declared preferences.

Date	State/territory	Calculated delegates			Type (Note: Differences between types: Open: Anyone can participate regardless of their registered party affiliation.; Semi-open: Anyone can participate except registered Republicans.; Semi-closed: Only registered Democrats or undeclared can participate.; Closed: Only registered Democrats can participate.)	Popular vote or equivalent (Note: Differences between types: CD: 'Popular vote' tallies the county delegates.; LDD: 'Popular vote' tallies the legislative district delegates.; SCD: 'Popular vote' tallies the state convention delegates.; SDE: 'Popular vote' tallies the state delegate equivalents.)		Estimated delegates (Note: Pledged delegates are elected with the understanding that they will support a specific candidate. Unpledged delegates (superdelegates) are not required to voice support for a specific candidate.)								
Date	State/territory	Calculated delegates			Type	Clinton	Sanders	Clinton			Sanders			Available (Note: One Illinois superdelegate is still committed to O'Malley. Therefore, the total number of available delegates is one less than expected.)		
Date	State/territory	P	U	T	Type	Clinton	Sanders	P	U	T	P	U	T	P	U	T
Feb 1	Iowa	44	7	51	Semi-open caucus	700 SDE (49.8%)	697 SDE (49.6%)	23	6	29	21	0	21	0	1	1
Feb 9	New Hampshire	24	8	32	Semi-closed primary	95,355 (37.7%)	152,193 (60.1%)	9	6	15	15	1	16	0	1	1
Feb 20	Nevada	35	8	43	Closed caucus	6,316 CD (52.6%)	5,678 CD (47.3%)	20	7	27	15	1	16	0	0	0
Feb 27	South Carolina	53	6	59	Open primary	272,379 (73.4%)	96,498 (26.0%)	39	5	44	14	0	14	0	1	1
Mar 1	Alabama	53	7	60	Open primary	309,926 (77.8%)	76,401 (19.2%)	44	6	50	9	0	9	0	1	1
Mar 1	American Samoa	6	5	11	Closed caucus	162 (68.4%)	61 (25.7%)	4	4	8	2	1	3	0	0	0
Mar 1	Arkansas	32	5	37	Open primary	146,057 (66.1%)	66,236 (30.0%)	22	5	27	10	0	10	0	0	0
Mar 1	Colorado	66	12	78	Closed caucus	49,789 (40.3%)	72,846 (59.0%)	25	9	34	41	0	41	0	3	3
Mar 1	Georgia	102	15	117	Open primary	543,008 (71.3%)	214,332 (28.2%)	73	11	84	29	0	29	0	4	4
Mar 1	Massachusetts	91	24	115	Semi-closed primary	606,822 (49.7%)	589,803 (48.3%)	46	21	67	45	1	46	0	2	2
Mar 1	Minnesota	77	16	93	Open caucus	73,510 (38.4%)	118,135 (61.6%)	31	12	43	46	2	48	0	2	2
Mar 1	Oklahoma	38	4	42	Semi-closed primary	139,443 (41.5%)	174,228 (51.9%)	17	1	18	21	1	22	0	2	2
Mar 1	Tennessee	67	8	75	Open primary	245,930 (66.1%)	120,800 (32.5%)	44	8	52	23	0	23	0	0	0
Mar 1	Texas	222	29	251	Open primary	936,004 (65.2%)	476,547 (33.2%)	147	21	168	75	0	75	0	8	8
Mar 1	Vermont	16	10	26	Open primary	18,338 (13.6%)	115,900 (85.7%)	0	5	5	16	5	21	0	0	0
Mar 1	Virginia	95	13	108	Open primary	504,741 (64.3%)	276,370 (35.2%)	62	12	74	33	0	33	0	1	1
Mar 5	Kansas	33	4	37	Closed caucus	12,593 (32.3%)	26,450 (67.7%)	10	4	14	23	0	23	0	0	0
Mar 5	Louisiana	51	8	59	Closed primary	221,733 (71.1%)	72,276 (23.2%)	37	6	43	14	0	14	0	2	2
Mar 5	Nebraska	25	5	30	Closed caucus	14,340 (42.9%)	19,120 (57.1%)	10	3	13	15	1	16	0	1	1
Mar 6	Maine	25	5	30	Closed caucus	1,232 SCD (35.5%)	2,231 SCD (64.3%)	8	4	12	17	1	18	0	0	0
Mar 1–8	Democrats Abroad	13	4 (Note: There are 8 unpledged delegates from Democrats Abroad that each cast half a vote at the national convention.)	17	Closed primary	10,689 (30.9%)	23,779 (68.9%)	4	2½	6½	9	½	9½	0	1	1
Mar 8	Michigan	130	17	147	Open primary	581,775 (48.3%)	598,943 (49.7%)	63	13	76	67	0	67	0	4	4
Mar 8	Mississippi	36	5	41	Open primary	187,334 (82.5%)	37,748 (16.6%)	31	3	34	5	2	7	0	0	0
Mar 12	Northern Marianas	6	5	11	Closed caucus	102 (54.0%)	65 (34.4%)	4	5	9	2	0	2	0	0	0
Mar 15	Florida	214	32	246	Closed primary	1,101,414 (64.4%)	568,839 (33.3%)	141	24	165	73	2	75	0	6	6
Mar 15	Illinois	156	27	183	Open primary	1,039,555 (50.6%)	999,494 (48.6%)	79	24	103	77	1	78	0	1	1
Mar 15	Missouri	71	13	84	Open primary	312,285 (49.6%)	310,711 (49.4%)	36	11	47	35	0	35	0	2	2
Mar 15	North Carolina	107	14	121	Semi-closed primary	622,915 (54.5%)	467,018 (40.9%)	60	9	69	47	2	49	0	3	3
Mar 15	Ohio	143	17	160	Semi-open primary	696,681 (56.1%)	535,395 (43.1%)	81	16	97	62	1	63	0	0	0
Mar 22	Arizona	75	10	85	Closed primary	262,459 (56.3%)	192,962 (41.4%)	42	6	48	33	1	34	0	3	3
Mar 22	Idaho	23	4	27	Open caucus	5,065 (21.2%)	18,640 (78.0%)	5	1	6	18	2	20	0	1	1
Mar 22	Utah	33	4	37	Semi-open caucus	15,666 (20.3%)	61,333 (79.3%)	6	2	8	27	2	29	0	0	0
Mar 26	Alaska	16	4	20	Closed caucus	2,146 (20.2%)	8,447 (79.6%)	3	1	4	13	1	14	0	2	2
Mar 26	Hawaii	25	9	34	Semi-closed caucus	10,125 (30.0%)	23,530 (69.8%)	8	5	13	17	2	19	0	2	2
Mar 26	Washington	101	17	118	Open caucus	7,140 LDD (27.1%)	19,159 LDD (72.7%)	27	11	38	74	0	74	0	6	6
Apr 5	Wisconsin	86	10	96	Open primary	433,739 (43.1%)	570,192 (56.6%)	38	9	47	48	1	49	0	0	0
Apr 9	Wyoming	14	4	18	Closed caucus	124 SCD (44.3%)	156 SCD (55.7%)	7	4	11	7	0	7	0	0	0
Apr 19	New York	247	44	291	Closed primary	1,133,980 (57.5%)	820,256 (41.6%)	139	41	180	108	0	108	0	3	3
Apr 26	Connecticut	55	16	71	Closed primary	170,045 (51.8%)	152,379 (46.4%)	28	15	43	27	0	27	0	1	1
Apr 26	Delaware	21	11	32	Closed primary	55,954 (59.8%)	36,662 (39.2%)	12	11	23	9	0	9	0	0	0
Apr 26	Maryland	95	24	119	Closed primary	573,242 (62.5%)	309,990 (33.8%)	60	17	77	35	1	36	0	6	6
Apr 26	Pennsylvania	189	19	208	Closed primary	935,107 (55.6%)	731,881 (43.5%)	106	19	125	83	0	83	0	1	1
Apr 26	Rhode Island	24	9	33	Semi-closed primary	52,749 (43.1%)	66,993 (54.7%)	11	9	20	13	0	13	0	0	0
May 3	Indiana	83	9	92	Open primary	303,705 (47.5%)	335,074 (52.5%)	39	7	46	44	0	44	0	2	2
May 7	Guam	7	5	12	Closed caucus	777 (59.5%)	528 (40.5%)	4	5	9	3	0	3	0	0	0
May 10	Nebraska	—N/a			Closed primary	42,692 (53.1%)	37,744 (46.9%)	Non-binding primary with no delegates allocated.								
May 10	West Virginia	29	8	37	Semi-closed primary	86,914 (35.8%)	124,700 (51.4%)	11	6	17	18	2	20	0	0	0
May 17	Kentucky	55	5	60	Closed primary	212,534 (46.8%)	210,623 (46.3%)	28	2	30	27	0	27	0	3	3
May 17	Oregon	61	13	74	Closed primary	269,846 (42.1%)	360,829 (56.2%)	25	7	32	36	3	39	0	3	3
May 24	Washington	—N/a			Open primary (Note: Open to all voters excluding those who caucused with the Republicans on February 20.)	420,461 (52.4%)	382,293 (47.6%)	Non-binding primary with no delegates allocated.								
Jun 4	Virgin Islands	7	5	12	Closed caucus	1,326 (87.12%)	196 (12.88%)	7	5	12	0	0	0	0	0	0
Jun 5	Puerto Rico	60	7	67	Open primary	52,658 (59.7%)	33,368 (37.9%)	37	6	43	23	0	23	0	1	1
Jun 7	California	475	76	551	Semi-closed primary	2,745,302 (53.1%)	2,381,722 (46.0%)	254	66	320	221	0	221	0	10	10
Jun 7	Montana	21	6	27	Open primary	55,805 (44.2%)	65,156 (51.6%)	10	5	15	11	1	12	0	0	0
Jun 7	New Jersey	126	16	142	Semi-closed primary	566,247 (63.3%)	328,058 (36.7%)	79	12	91	47	2	49	0	2	2
Jun 7	New Mexico	34	9	43	Closed primary	111,334 (51.5%)	104,741 (48.5%)	18	9	27	16	0	16	0	0	0
Jun 7	North Dakota	18	5	23	Open caucus (Note: Open to all voters, though those who attend must state they will identify as a Democrat for the 2016 election.)	106 SCD (25.6%)	258 SCD (64.2%)	5	1	6	13	1	14	0	3	3
Jun 7	South Dakota	20	5	25	Semi-closed primary	27,047 (51.0%)	25,959 (49.0%)	10	2	12	10	0	10	0	3	3
Jun 14	District of Columbia	20	25	45	Closed primary	76,704 (78.0%)	20,361 (20.7%)	16	23	39	4	2	6	0	0	0
Total		4,051	712	4,763		16,847,084 (55.20%)	13,168,222 (43.14%)	2,205	570½	2,775½	1,846	43½	1,889½	0	97	97
Date	State/territory	P	U	T	Type	Clinton	Sanders	P	U	T	P	U	T	P	U	T
Date	State/territory	Calculated delegates			Type	Popular vote or equivalent		Clinton delegates			Sanders delegates			Available delegates		

== Superdelegate endorsements ==
Superdelegates are elected officials and members of the Democratic National Committee who vote at the Democratic National Convention for their preferred candidate. Also known as unpledged delegates, they comprise 15% of the convention (712 votes out of 4,763) and they may change their preference at any time. The table below reflects current public endorsements of candidates by superdelegates, as detailed and sourced in the full list above. Because commonly referenced estimates of superdelegate support, including those by CNN and the AP, do not identify individual delegates as supporting a given candidate, their published tallies may differ from the totals computed here.

	Distinguished party leaders	Governors	Senators	Representatives	DNC members	Totals
Hillary Clinton	17	20	45	177	313½	572½
Bernie Sanders	1	0	2	7	32½	42½
Martin O'Malley	0	0	0	0	1	1
No endorsement	2	1	0	7	86	96
Totals	20	21	47	191	433	712

Note: Democrats Abroad Superdelegates are assigned half-votes; each of them accounts for ½ rather than 1 in the table above.

== Close states ==
States where the margin of victory was under 1%:

1. Missouri, 0.25%
2. Iowa, 0.25%
3. Kentucky, 0.42%

States where the margin of victory was under 5%:

1. Massachusetts, 1.40%
2. Michigan, 1.42%
3. Illinois, 1.95%
4. South Dakota, 2.06%
5. New Mexico, 3.06%
6. Indiana, 4.92%

States where the margin of victory was under 10%:

1. Nevada, 5.28%
2. Connecticut, 5.38%
3. California, 7.03%
4. Montana, 7.40%

States where the margin of victory was under 20%:

1. Oklahoma, 10.36%
2. Rhode Island, 11.63%
3. Pennsylvania, 12.08%
4. Ohio, 12.99%
5. Wisconsin, 13.54%
6. Wyoming, 13.64%
7. North Carolina, 13.64%
8. Oregon, 14.18%
9. Nebraska, 14.28%
10. Arizona, 14.90%
11. West Virginia, 15.57%
12. New York, 16.06%
13. Colorado, 18.68%

== Maps ==
Breakdown of the results in vote distribution, by state

Results of popular vote, by county

Results in popular vote margin, by state

Results in popular vote margin, by county

Breakdown of the results in pledged delegates, by state

Breakdown of the results in total delegate count, by state

Results in pledged delegates, by state

== See also ==
Related

Democratic Party articles

- Results of the 2016 Democratic Party presidential primaries
- Nationwide opinion polling for the 2016 Democratic Party presidential primaries
- Statewide opinion polling for the 2016 Democratic Party presidential primaries
- 2016 Democratic Party presidential candidates
- 2016 Democratic Party presidential debates and forums
- List of Democratic Party presidential primaries

Presidential primaries

- 2016 Constitution Party presidential primaries
- 2016 Green Party presidential primaries
- 2016 Libertarian Party presidential primaries
- 2016 Republican Party presidential primaries

National conventions

- 2016 Constitution Party National Convention
- 2016 Democratic National Convention
- 2016 Green National Convention
- 2016 Libertarian National Convention
- 2016 Republican National Convention
