= 2016 Minnesota Republican presidential caucuses =

- March 1, 2016
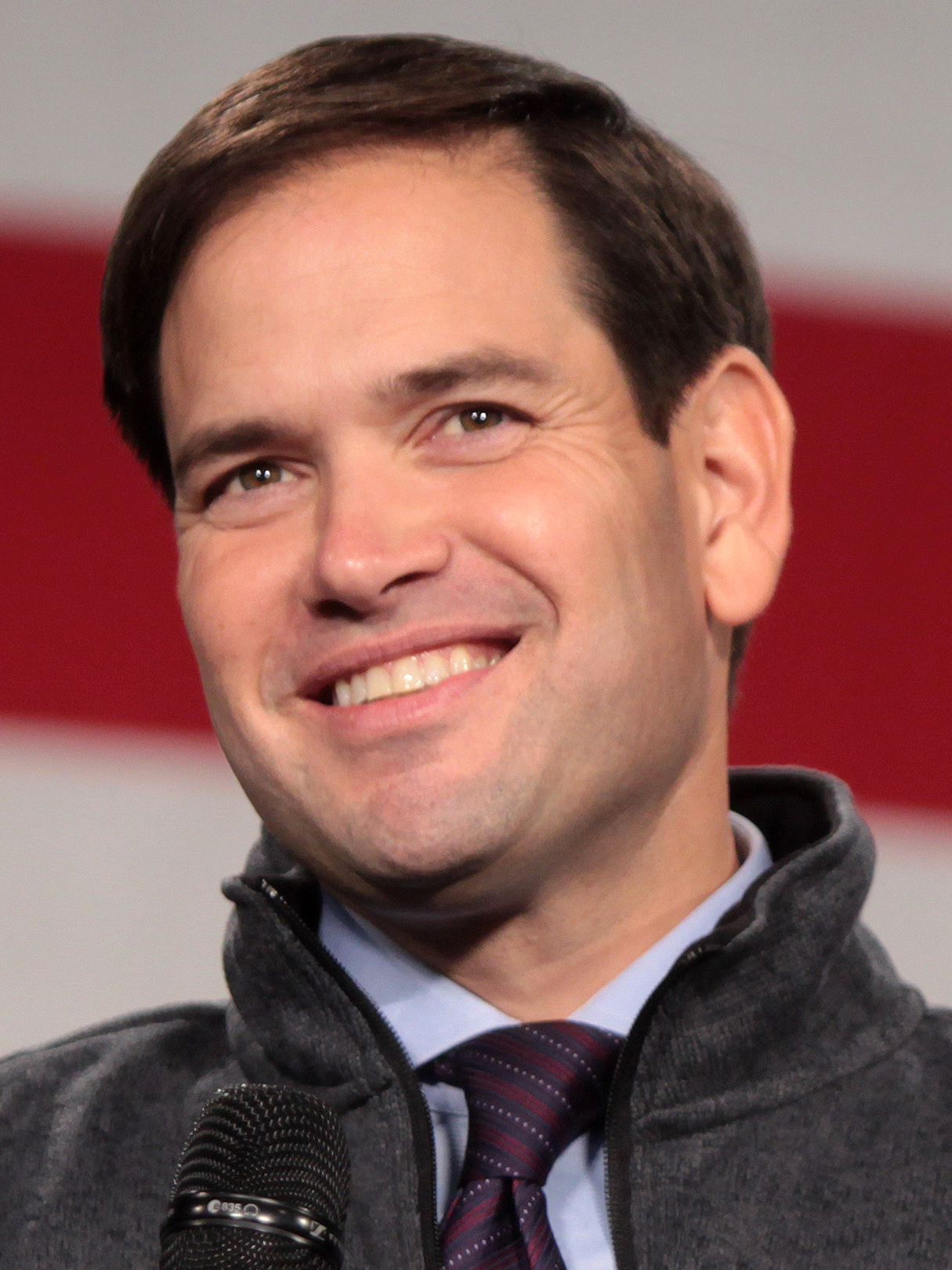

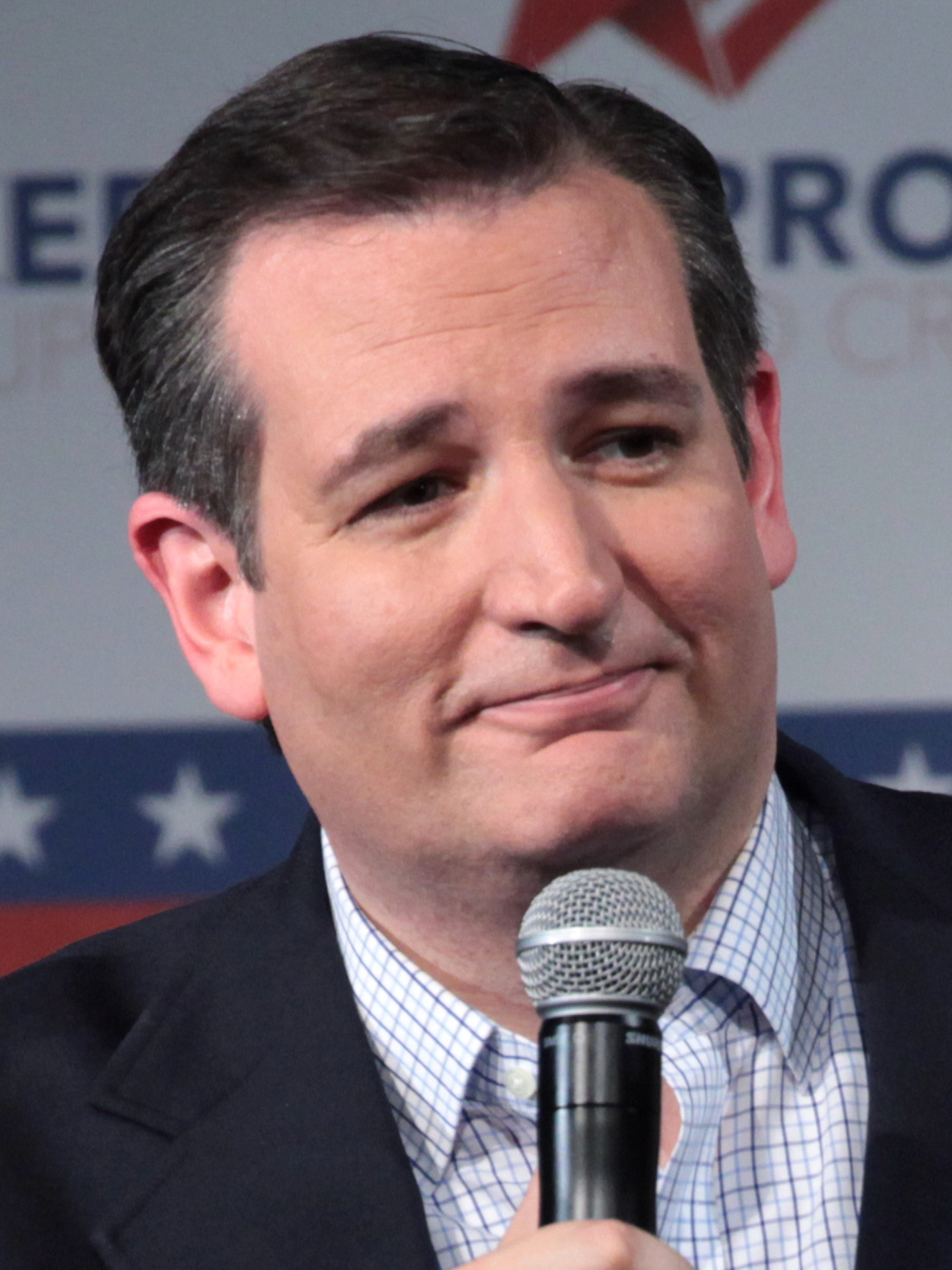

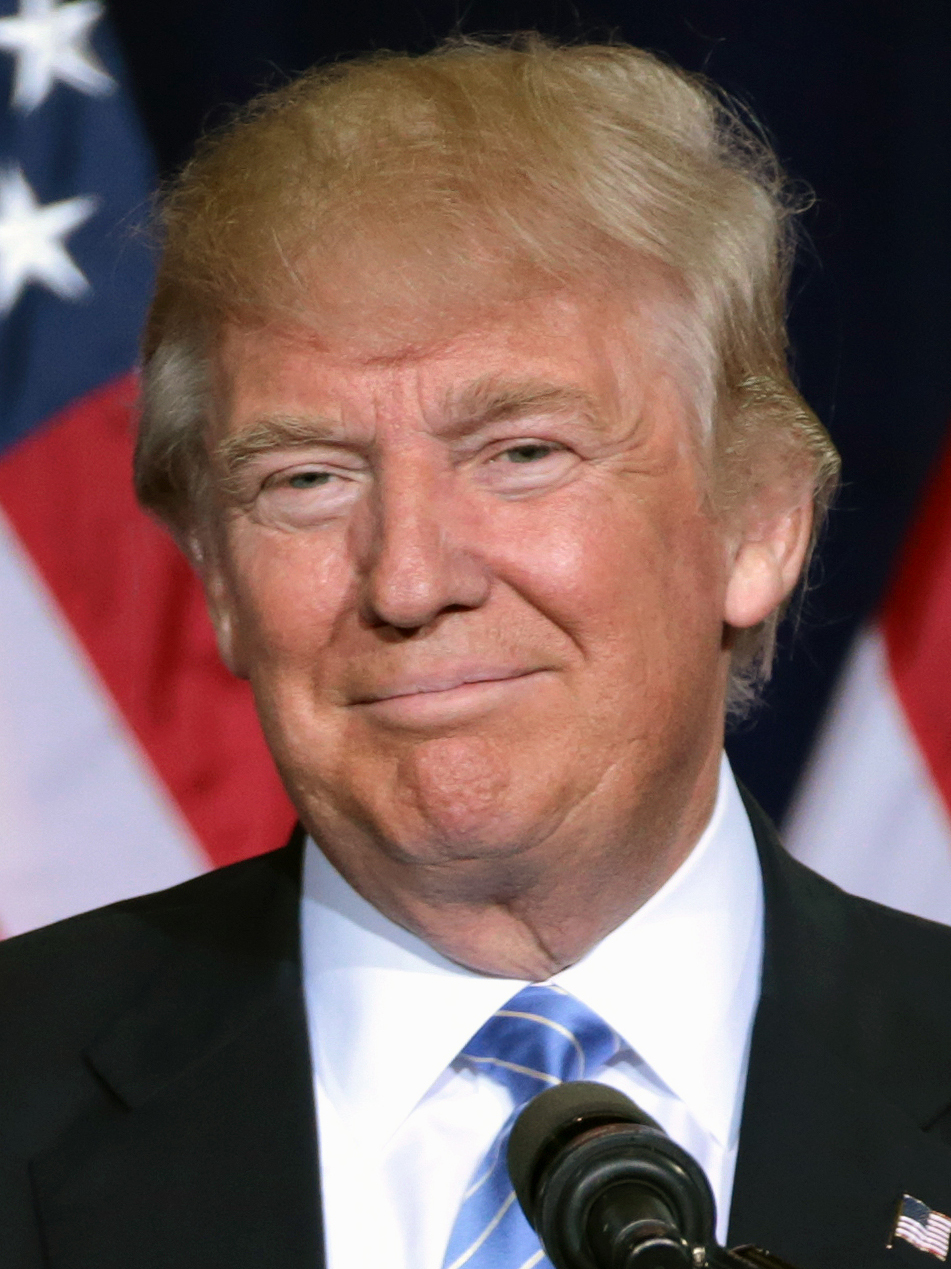

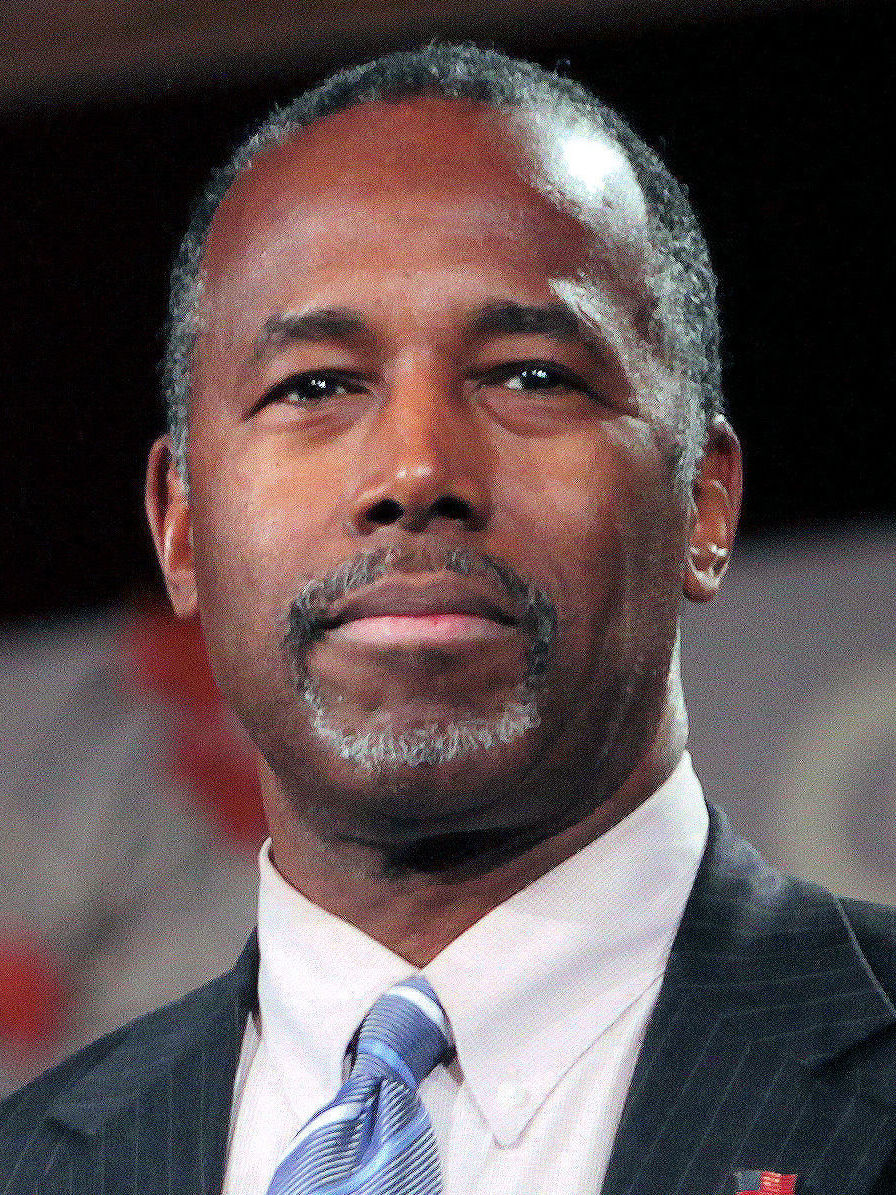

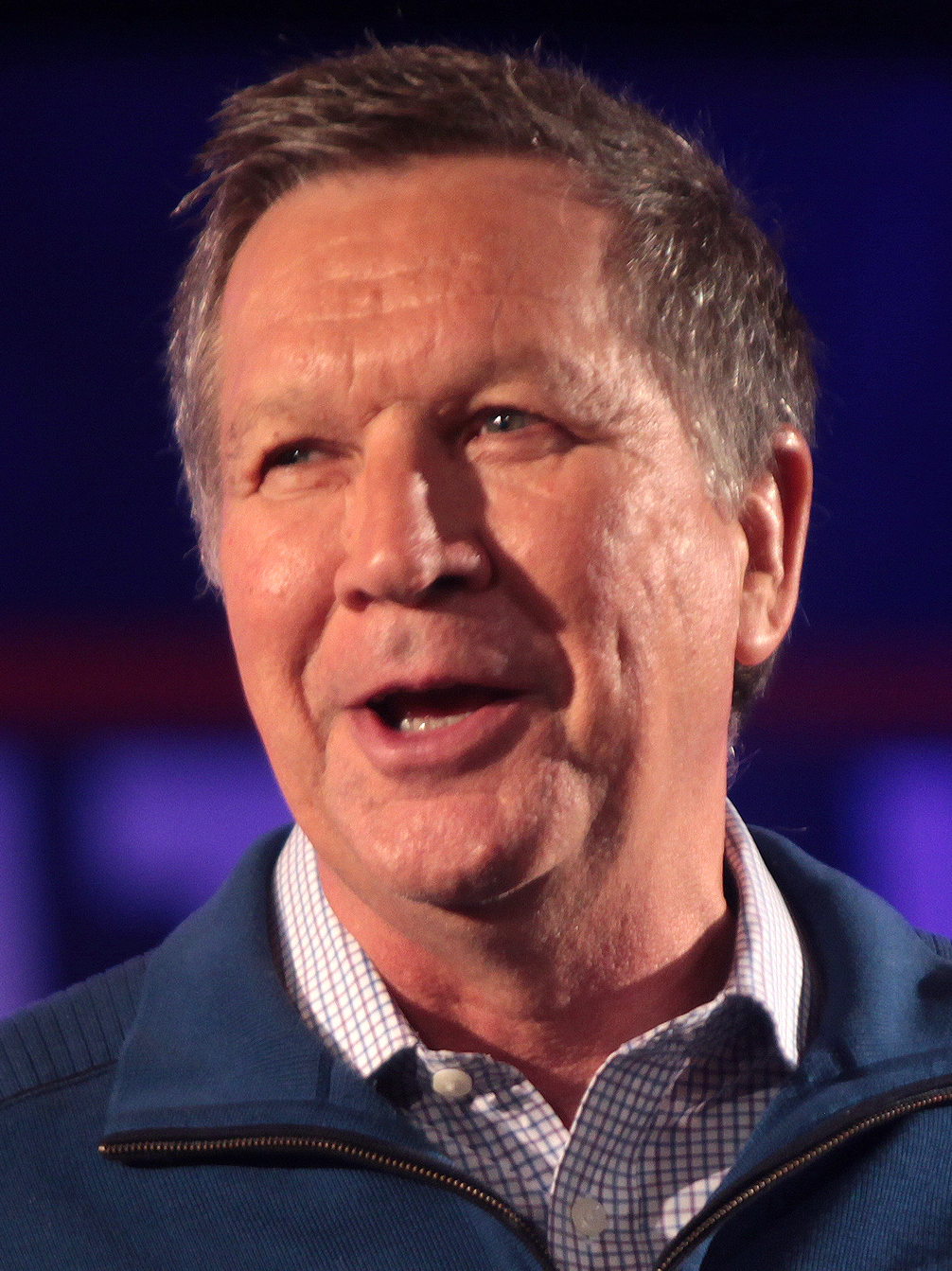
| Candidate | Marco Rubio | Ted Cruz | Donald Trump |
| Home state | Florida | Texas | New York |
| Delegate count | 17 | 13 | 8 |
| Popular vote | 41,126 | 32,684 | 24,018 |
| Percentage | 36.5% | 29.0% | 21.3% |
| Candidate | Ben Carson | John Kasich |
| Home state | Virginia | Ohio |
| Delegate count | 0 | 0 |
| Popular vote | 8,233 | 6,488 |
| Percentage | 7.3% | 5.8% |
- Minnesota results Marco Rubio 30-40% 40-50% Ted Cruz 30-40% Donald J. Trump Tie

The 2016 Minnesota Republican presidential caucuses were held on March 1, 2016, as part of the Republican Party's series of presidential primaries. This event was part of the Super Tuesday elections, the day on which the greatest number of states hold primaries and caucuses. The Democratic Party held its Minnesota caucuses on the same day.

The results were notable because it was the only state that was won by Florida senator Marco Rubio. He won 36.5% of the popular vote and received 17 national delegates. He had a particularly strong showing in the 3rd, 4th, and 5th congressional districts. Rubio's success in Minnesota followed a substantial campaigning effort in the state, including a rally in Anoka County on the day of the caucus.

Minnesota was also one of the rare states where then-candidate Donald Trump finished in third place, behind both Rubio and Texas senator Ted Cruz. Analysts attributed Rubio's success in Minnesota to several factors, including the state's caucus format, which tends to favor candidates with strong organizational structures and active, engaged supporters. Additionally, the high proportion of college-educated voters in Minnesota was seen as favorable to Rubio, who tended to perform well with this demographic.

The Minnesota caucus experienced a high voter turnout, with reports of many attending a caucus for the first time. This surge led to organizational difficulties, such as overcrowding and ballot shortages. In some locations, volunteers struggled to manage the influx of participants.

== Polling ==
| Poll | MoE | Date(s) | Rubio | Cruz | Trump | Carson | Others |
|---|---|---|---|---|---|---|---|
| Star Tribune/Mason-Dixon | ± 6.5% | Jan. 18–20, 2016 | 23% | 21% | 18% | 11% | 27% (Note: Jeb Bush 7%, Chris Christie 5%, other 6%, undecided 9%) |
| KSTP | ± 4.4% | Oct. 29–Nov. 2, 2015 | 16% | 4% | 26% | 19% | 35% (Note: Jeb Bush 9%, Carly Fiorina 4%, Rand Paul 3%, Mike Huckabee 2%, others 4%, undecided 13%) |
| PPP | ± 5.2% | Jul. 30–Aug. 2, 2015 | 5% | 7% | 18% | 11% | 63% (Note: Scott Walker 19%, Jeb Bush 15%, Mike Huckabee 6%, Rand Paul 5%, Chris Christie 4%, Carly Fiorina 3%, John Kasich 3%, Bobby Jindal 1%, Rick Perry 0%, Rick Santorum 0%, Lindsey Graham 0%, George Pataki 0%, Jim Gilmore 0%, undecided 1%) |
| Suffolk | ± 10% | Apr. 24–28, 2014 | 8.1% | 9.2% | —N/a | 4.6% | 78.2% (Note: Jeb Bush 14.94%, Rick Perry 14.94%, Chris Christie 9.20%, Rand Paul 5.75%, Rick Santorum 4.60%, Condoleezza Rice 3.45%, Scott Walker 3.45%, Bobby Jindal 2.30%, Sarah Palin 2.30%, Paul Ryan 2.30%, Mike Huckabee 1.15%, undecided 13.79%) |

== Results ==
Florida senator Marco Rubio emerged as the winner of the caucus, securing 41,126 (36.5%) votes, which translated to 17 delegates. Ted Cruz, senator from Texas, came in second with 32,684 (29.0%) votes, earning 13 delegates. Donald J. Trump, who was leading in most other Republican Super Tuesday states, came in third place in Minnesota with 24,018 (21.3%) votes and received 8 delegates.

2016 Minnesota Republican caucuses results
| Candidate | Votes | Percentage | Delegates |
|---|---|---|---|
| Marco Rubio | 41,397 | 36.24% | 17 |
| Ted Cruz | 33,181 | 29.04% | 13 |
| Donald Trump | 24,473 | 21.42% | 8 |
| Ben Carson | 8,422 | 7.37% | 0 |
| John Kasich | 6,565 | 5.75% | 0 |
| Write-ins | 207 | 0.18% | 0 |
| Total | 114,245 | 100.00% | 38 |
Source: Office of the Minnesota Secretary of State
