= 2016 American Samoa Democratic presidential caucuses =

- March 1, 2016
- Turnout: 1.5% (registered voters)

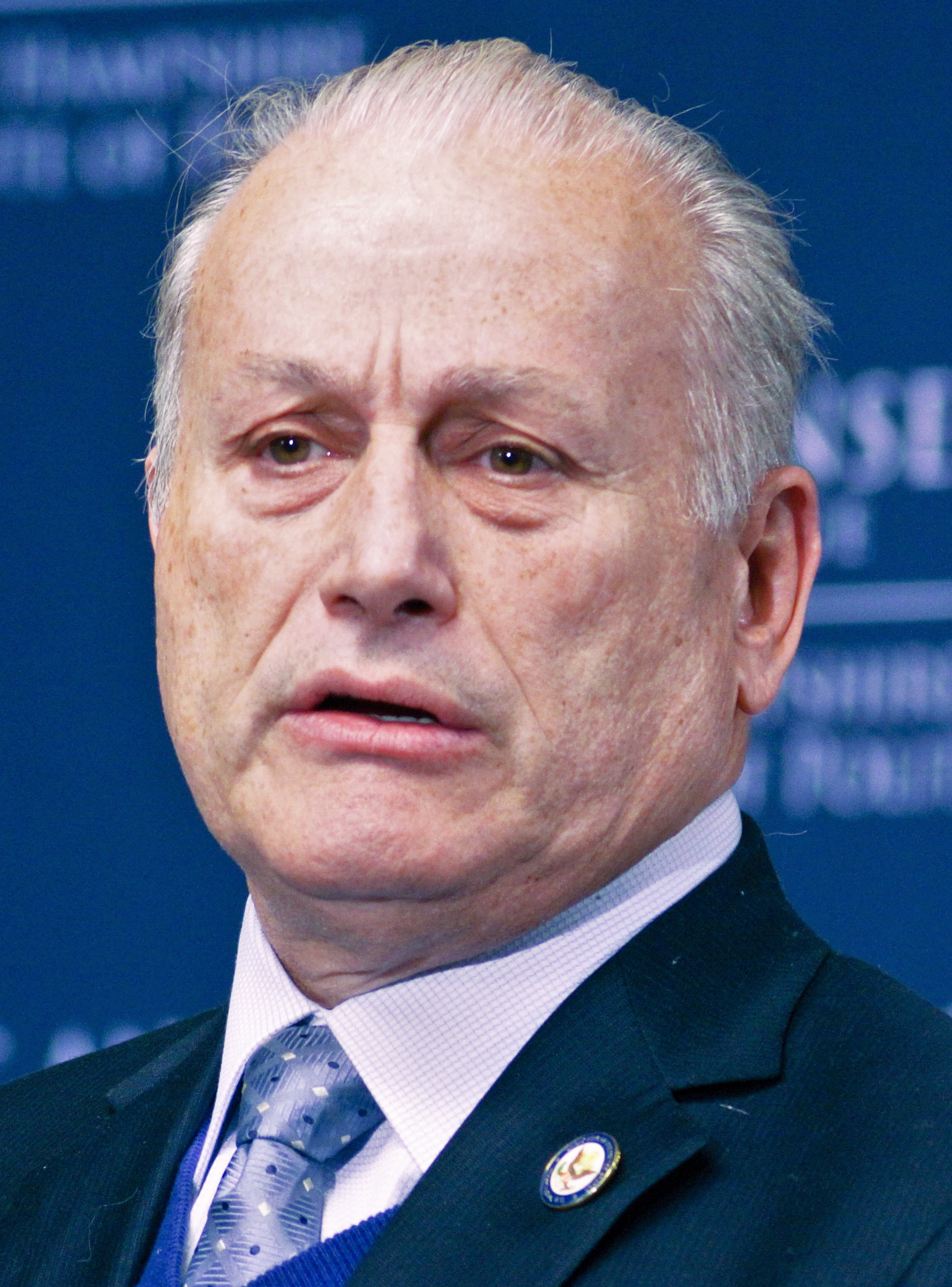
Candidate	Hillary Clinton	Bernie Sanders	Rocky De La Fuente
Home state	New York	Vermont	California
Delegate count	4	2	0
Popular vote	162	61	14
Percentage	68.4%	25.7%	5.9%

The 2016 American Samoa Democratic presidential caucuses took place on March 1 in the U.S. territory of American Samoa as one of the Democratic Party's primaries ahead of the 2016 presidential election.

On the same day, dubbed "Super Tuesday," Democratic primaries were held in eleven other states, while the Republican Party held primaries in eleven states as well. The Republican Party's American Samoa caucus was held on March 22, 2016.

== Results ==
Primary date: March 1, 2016
National delegates: 11

2016 Democratic Party's presidential nominating process in American Samoa – Summary of results –
Candidate	Popular vote		Estimated delegates		
Candidate	Count	Percentage	Pledged	Unpledged	Total
Hillary Clinton	162	68.4%	4	4	8
Bernie Sanders	61	25.7%	2	1	3
Rocky De La Fuente	14	5.9%			
Total	237	100%	6	5	11
