= 2016 United States presidential election in the Northern Mariana Islands =

United States presidential election in the Northern Mariana Islands, 2016
- November 8, 2016
President before election
Barack Obama
Democratic
Elected President
Donald Trump
Republican

The Northern Mariana Islands did not participate in the November 8, 2016 general election for President of the United States, because it is a territory and not a state. However, the five non-incorporated territories that send delegates to the House of Representatives participated in the presidential primaries of both major parties.

In the presidential primaries, voters expressed their preferences for the Democratic and Republican parties' respective nominees for president. Registered members of each party only voted in their party's primary, while voters who were unaffiliated chose any one primary in which to vote. The caucuses for both parties were held in March 2016.

== Caucuses ==
=== Republican caucus ===
Prior to the Republican caucus, Ralph Torres, the Governor of Northern Mariana Islands, endorsed Donald Trump. The Republican caucus took place on March 15, 2016:

Northern Mariana Islands Republican caucus, March 15, 2016
Candidate	Votes	Percentage	Actual delegate count		
Candidate	Votes	Percentage	Bound	Unbound	Total
Donald Trump	343	72.82%	9	0	9
Ted Cruz	113	23.99%	0	0	0
John Kasich	10	2.12%	0	0	0
Marco Rubio	5	1.06%	0	0	0
Unprojected delegates:			0	0	0
Total:	471	100.00%	9	0	9
Sources: The Green Papers

=== Democratic caucus ===
On January 11, 2016, Northern Mariana Islander delegate Gregorio Sablan endorsed Hillary Clinton. The Democratic caucus took place on March 12, 2016.

This was the first time that the Northern Mariana Islands participated in the Democratic caucuses.

Northern Marianas Democratic caucus, March 12, 2016
Candidate	Popular vote		Estimated delegates		
Candidate	Count	Percentage	Pledged	Unpledged	Total
Hillary Clinton	102	53.97%	4	1	5
Bernie Sanders	65	34.39%	2	0	2
Uncommitted	22	11.64%	0	4	4
Total	189	100%	6	5	11

== See also ==
- Democratic Party presidential debates, 2016
- Democratic Party presidential primaries, 2016
- Republican Party presidential debates, 2016
- Republican Party presidential primaries, 2016
