= 2016 Minnesota Democratic presidential caucuses =

- March 1, 2016

Candidate	Bernie Sanders	Hillary Clinton
Home state	Vermont	New York
Delegate count	46	31
Popular vote	126,229	78,381
Percentage	61.69%	38.31%
- Minnesota results by reporting district Clinton: 40–50% 50–60% 60–70% Sanders: 40–50% 50–60% 60–70% 70–80% 80–90% Tie

The 2016 Minnesota Democratic presidential caucuses took place on March 1 in the U.S. state of Minnesota as one of the Democratic Party's primaries ahead of the 2016 presidential election.

On the same day, dubbed "Super Tuesday," Democratic primaries were held in ten other states plus American Samoa, while the Republican Party held primaries in eleven states including their own Minnesota caucuses.

== Opinion polling ==
Poll source	Date	1st	2nd	3rd	Other
Caucus results	March 1, 2016	Bernie Sanders; 61.6%	Hillary Clinton; 38.4%		
Star Tribune/Mason-Dixon Margin of error: ± 5.7% Sample size: 800	January 18–20, 2016	Hillary Clinton; 59%	Bernie Sanders; 25%	Martin O'Malley; 1%	Undecided 15%
Public Policy Polling Margin of error: ± 4.9% Sample size: 426	July 30 – August 2, 2015	Hillary Clinton; 50%	Bernie Sanders; 32%	Martin O'Malley; 4%	Lincoln Chafee 3%, Jim Webb 2%, Not sure 10%
Suffolk University Margin of error: ± ? Sample size: 100	April 24–28, 2014	Hillary Clinton; 63%	Elizabeth Warren; 15%	Joe Biden; 4%	Cory Booker 3%, Deval Patrick 2%, Mark Warner 2%, Andrew Cuomo 1%, Undecided 10%
Public Policy Polling Margin of error: ± 5.1% Sample size: 373	January 18–20, 2013	Hillary Clinton; 59%	Joe Biden; 14%	Amy Klobuchar; 11%	Elizabeth Warren 4%, Andrew Cuomo 3%, Martin O'Malley 1%, Deval Patrick 0%, Brian Schweitzer 1%, Mark Warner 0%, Someone Else/Undecided 10%
Public Policy Polling Margin of error: ± 5.1% Sample size: 373	January 18–20, 2013	Amy Klobuchar; 43%	Andrew Cuomo; 14%	Elizabeth Warren; 10%	Martin O'Malley 1%, Deval Patrick 1%, Brian Schweitzer 0%, Mark Warner 0%, Someone Else/Undecided 30%

== Results ==
Primary date: March 1, 2016
National delegates: 69

Minnesota Democratic caucuses, March 1, 2016
Candidate	Popular vote		Estimated delegates		
Candidate	Count	Percentage	Pledged	Unpledged	Total
Bernie Sanders	126,229	61.69%	46	1	47
Hillary Clinton	78,381	38.31%	31	13	44
Uncommitted	—N/a		0	2	2
Total	204,610	100%	77	16	93

== Analysis ==
Bernie Sanders scored an imperative, much-needed victory in the Minnesota caucus, a state he had targeted to keep his path to the nomination alive. With its populist, mostly white electorate, Minnesota was a state seen as favorable to Sanders based on his performance in previous caucus contests, which was only aided by high voter turnout, almost topping the record of 211,000 votes in the 2008 Minnesota Democratic Presidential Primary. Sanders ran up big margins in Minneapolis and the Minneapolis suburbs, and in the working-class, mostly white Iron Range of northern Minnesota which contains the city of Duluth, where he won north of 60% of the vote. Sanders won 76 out of 87 counties and all eight congressional districts in the state.

Sanders had campaigned hard for the state, appearing with Rep. Keith Ellison, the Congressional Progressive Caucus co-chair who endorsed Sanders in October 2015.
