= 2016 U.S. Virgin Islands Democratic presidential caucuses =

- June 4, 2016

Candidate	Hillary Clinton	Bernie Sanders
Home state	New York	Vermont
Delegate count	12	0
Popular vote	1,326	196
Percentage	87.12%	12.88%

The 2016 U.S. Virgin Islands Democratic presidential caucuses were held on June 4 in the U.S. territory of the United States Virgin Islands as one of the Democratic Party's primaries ahead of the 2016 presidential election.

Neither the Democratic Party nor the Republican Party held any other primaries on that day, with the Republican Party's own Virgin Islands caucus having taken place on March 10.

Seven of Virgin Islands' 12 Democratic delegates are pledged to presidential contenders based on the results of the voting in the Virgin Islands Territorial Convention. A mandatory 15 percent threshold is required in order for a presidential contender to be pledged National Convention delegates.

The At-Large delegates are to be pledged proportionally to presidential contenders based on the Caucus results on each of the three islands: four from St Thomas and St. John jointly, and three from St. Croix. Hillary Clinton won the Virgin Islands Democratic Caucuses, which was her biggest margin in the primaries.

This is the only primary where Bernie Sanders receives zero delegates. In 2008, the primary of the same place was where Hillary Clinton received zero delegates.

== Results ==
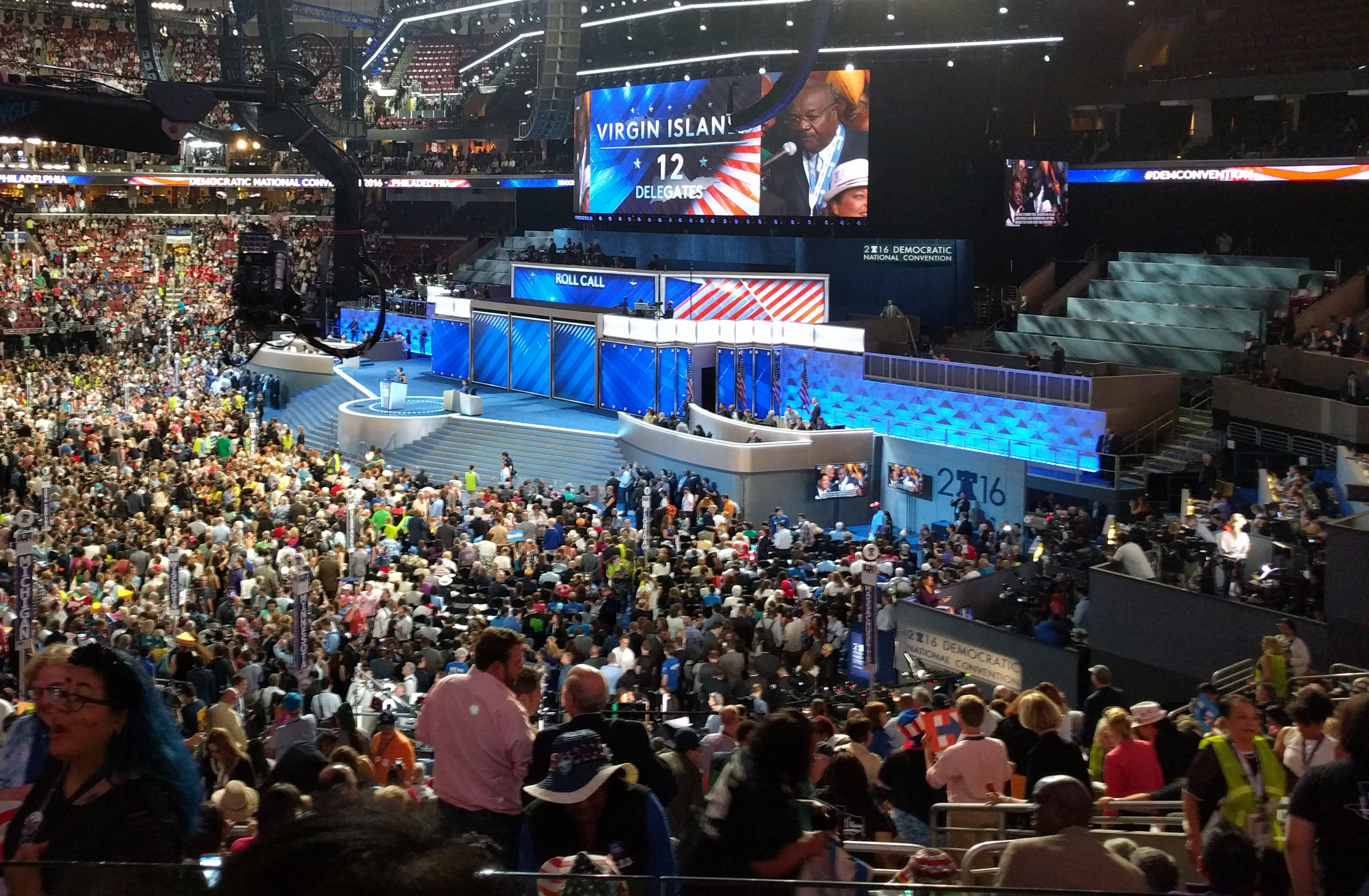
Virgin Islands delegation participates in the roll call vote at the 2016 Democratic National Convention

U.S. Virgin Islands Democratic caucuses, June 4, 2016
Candidate	Popular vote		Estimated delegates		
Candidate	Count	Percentage	Pledged	Unpledged	Total
Hillary Clinton	1,326	87.12%	7	5	12
Bernie Sanders	196	12.88%	0	0	0
Uncommitted	—N/a		0	0	0
Total	1,514	100%	7	5	12
