= 2016 Wyoming Democratic presidential caucuses =

- April 9, 2016

Candidate	Bernie Sanders	Hillary Clinton
Home state	Vermont	New York
Delegate count	7	7
Percentage	55.7%	44.3%
Election results by county.
Sanders
50 – 60%
60 – 70%
70 – 80%
80 – 90%
Clinton
40 – 50%
50 – 60%
60 – 70%

The 2016 Wyoming Democratic presidential caucuses were held on April 9 in the U.S. state of Wyoming, representing the first tier of the Wyoming Democratic Party's nomination contest for the 2016 presidential election. Only registered Democrats were allowed to participate in the closed precinct caucuses.

Vermont Senator Bernie Sanders won the contest with 55.7% of the county delegates, distancing the national frontrunner, former Secretary of State Hillary Clinton by more than 10%. Following a series of primary wins, the Wyoming vote further boosted his momentum, ten days ahead of the important New York primary. At the May 28 state convention, the two candidates split the 14 pledged delegates evenly. Sanders was widely expected to win an outright majority of the delegates in the least populous and most Republican-leaning U.S. state, though no opinion polls had been conducted.

Clinton enjoyed the support of the four party leaders attending the 2016 Democratic National Convention as unpledged "superdelegates," improving upon her performance in her first candidacy in the 2008, although this time she didn't campaign in person. After the Republican Party already held their own Wyoming caucuses earlier in March, no other primaries were scheduled for that day by either party.

== Background ==
=== Political landscape ===
Wyoming is the least populous of all 50 U.S. states. With less than 30% of the population identifying with or leaning towards the Democratic Party, compared to almost 60% identifying with or leaning towards the Republicans, it is also the most solid Republican state, ahead of Idaho and Utah.

In the 2012 presidential election, incumbent President Barack Obama received less than 28% of the Wyoming vote, trailing Mitt Romney by more than 40 points, after running unopposed in the Democratic caucuses. In his first presidential election in 2008, running against Republican candidate John McCain, he received 32.5% of the vote, after defeating Hillary Clinton in the Wyoming caucuses with 61% of the popular vote. In her first candidacy Clinton had surprisingly made Wyoming a focus of her campaign, joining both her daughter Chelsea and husband Bill Clinton in a final campaign sprint.

=== 2016 campaign ===
Though no opinion polls have been conducted in Wyoming, Bernie Sanders was expected to win a clear majority of the 14 pledged delegates. Ten days ahead of the important New York primary, Sanders hoped to extend his series of wins. National frontrunner Hillary Clinton, who enjoyed the support of the four party leaders attending the 2016 Democratic National Convention as unpledged "superdelegates," though this time, she didn't campaign in Wyoming in person. Instead, her campaign sent her husband, former President Bill Clinton to hold a stump speech in Cheyenne's Kiwanis Community House, which was attended by some 500 people., more than the final reported turnout of 280.

== Procedure ==
=== First-tier county caucuses ===
As these are closed caucuses, only residents registered as Democratic Party affiliates could participate in the nomination process. Registration was possible at the county clerks' offices by March 25, and was open to 17 year old residents turning 18 by the November 8 presidential election. Except for the registration, the caucuses are fully administered by the Wyoming Democratic Party, and are held at 11 a.m. local time (MDT) in each of Wyoming's 23 counties.

=== State convention pledging national delegates ===
The first-tier county caucuses elected 280 state delegates to the Wyoming Democratic Party's state convention, took place on May 28. There, all present state delegates nominated the national delegates to the 2016 Democratic National Convention.

While Wyoming's Democrats sent 18 delegates to the 2016 Democratic National Convention, only 14 out of these will be pledged to the candidates in proportion to the electorate's preferences. The remaining four Wyoming delegates are unpledged "Party Leaders and Elected Officials" (PLEOs), or "Superdelegates", who may vote for whomever they wish at the party's upcoming National Convention.

Out of the 14 pledged delegates, eight district-level delegates pledged to one of the candidates in proportion to the support received at all 23 caucuses of Wyoming's single congressional district. Another six delegates are pledged at the 28 May State Convention, in proportion to the support each candidate receives there. Candidates with less than 15% support were discarded for being "not viable".

=== Superdelegates ===
The state party's four superdelegates, Ana Cuprill, Mike Gierau, Mary Hales and Bruce Palmer, are members of the Democratic National Committee (DNC), and have previously endorsed Clinton.

== Results ==
Vermont senator Bernie Sanders won the contest with 55.7% of the county delegates. The two candidates were however expected to split the 14 pledged delegates evenly, though the final apportionment took place at the May 28 state convention, and depended on all elected county delegates showing up. Clinton enjoyed the support of the four party leaders attending the 2016 Democratic National Convention as unpledged "superdelegates," improved upon her performance in her first candidacy in 2008.

Wyoming Democratic caucuses, April 9, 2016
Candidate	County delegates		Estimated national delegates		
Candidate	Count	Percentage	Pledged	Unpledged	Total
Bernie Sanders	156	55.7%	7	0	7
Hillary Clinton	124	44.3%	7	4	11
Uncommitted	—N/a		–	–	–
Total		100%	14	4	18

=== Detailed results per county ===
Detailed results for the Wyoming Democratic caucuses, April 9, 2016
County	Delegates		
County	Total	Sanders	Clinton
Albany	33	25	8
Big Horn	4	2	2
Campbell	18	12	6
Carbon	7	3	4
Converse	5	3	2
Crook	2	1	1
Fremont	20	10	10
Goshen	5	2	3
Hot Springs	2	1	1
Johnson	2	1	1
Laramie	51	25	26
Lincoln	6	3	3
Natrona	38	18	20
Niobrara	2	2	0
Park	13	8	5
Platte	3	2	1
Sheridan	14	7	7
Sublette	4	3	1
Sweetwater	22	12	10
Teton	15	9	6
Uinta	9	5	4
Washakie	3	1	2
Weston	2	1	1
Total	280	156	124

== See also ==
- 2016 Wyoming Republican presidential caucuses
