= 2016 Colorado Republican presidential caucuses =

- April 9, 2016
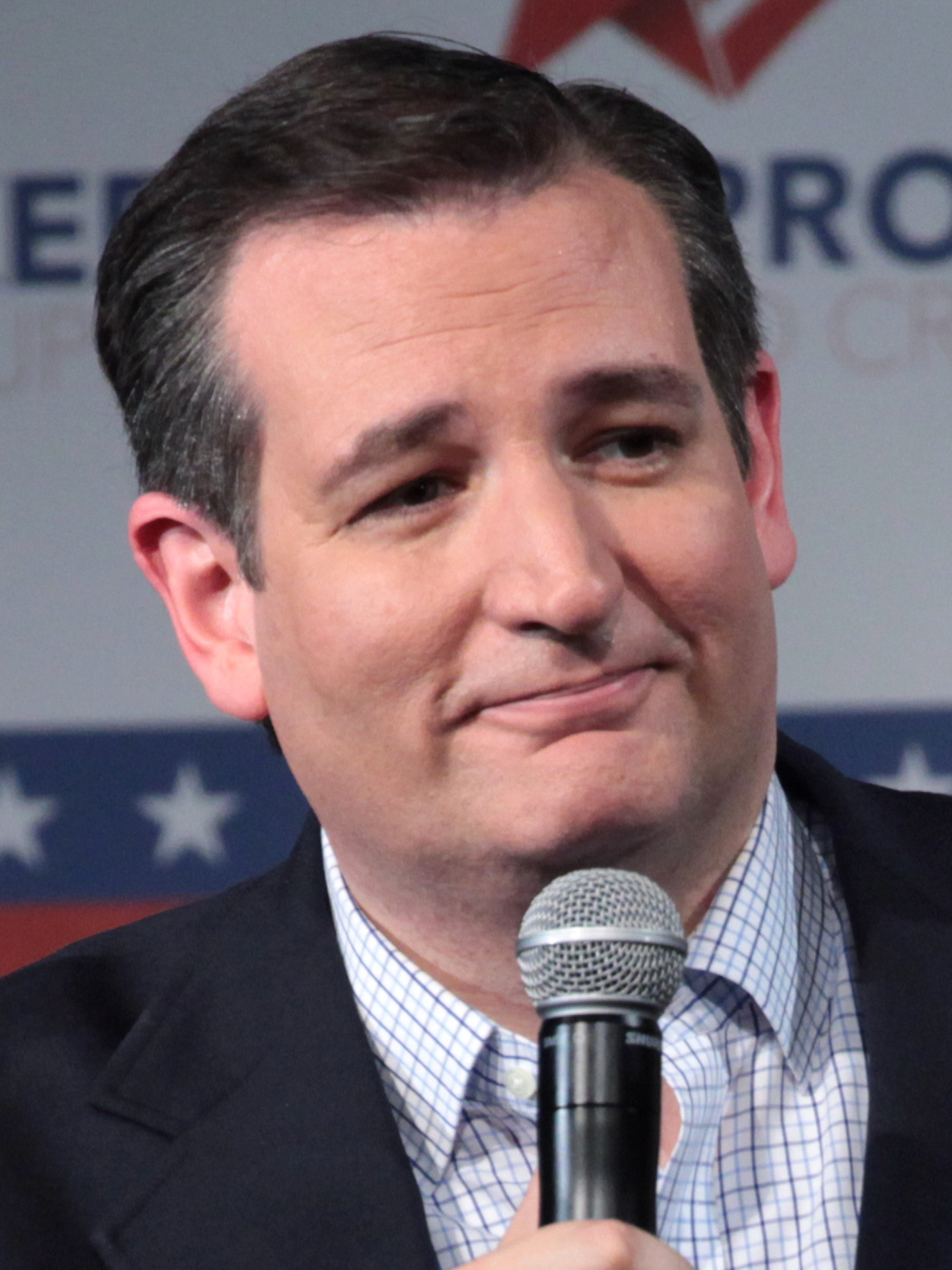

Candidate	Ted Cruz	Uncommitted
Home state	Texas	N/A
Delegate count	30	7

The 2016 Colorado Republican presidential caucuses took place in early April in the U.S. state of Colorado, as a part of the Republican Party's series of presidential primaries ahead of the 2016 presidential election. The Colorado contest consisted of a series of congressional district conventions on April 2, 7 and 8 and a state convention on April 9. A non-binding "beauty contest" caucus was held March 1 to coincide with the Super Tuesday conventions. Ted Cruz won a majority of delegates in the convention.

== Background ==
In the 2012 contest, Colorado held a caucus in order to determine delegate allocation, although the state had traditionally held a non-binding caucus. While the state's Republican Party attempted to hold the traditional non-binding straw poll in 2016 as well, the national GOP prohibited states from holding non-binding straw polls in the 2016 election. In addition, a bill in the Colorado Senate to create a preference primary died in committee.

== The state of the campaign ==
Despite an early victory by Ted Cruz in the Iowa caucuses, Donald Trump was seen as making steady progress towards the Republican nomination at the time. Trump was victorious in 7 of the contests on March 1, with Cruz seen as the only viable threat to Trump after victories in his home state of Texas and 3 other March 1 contests. Marco Rubio performed worse than anticipated on March 1, taking only Minnesota. On March 8, two primaries and a caucus were held in Hawaii, Michigan and Mississippi. Despite a poll from American Research Group that showed Kasich leading Trump in Michigan, Trump won all three contests.

On March 15's primaries, Donald Trump took four of the five contests- Florida, Illinois, Missouri and North Carolina. Trump however was defeated in Ohio by John Kasich 2016 presidential campaign, losing all 66 of the state's delegates. Marco Rubio suspended his campaign after losing the Florida contest, leaving just Cruz and Kasich in the race to oppose Trump.

On March 22, Trump won the Arizona contest and all of its 58 pledged delegates, while Cruz capitalized on Trump's comments critical of Mitt Romney's Mormon faith to take the state of Utah and its 40 delegates.

On April 1–3, the North Dakota state convention was held. Capitalizing on a weak ground operation by Donald Trump, Ted Cruz claimed the support of 18 uncommitted delegates to just 1 for Trump. This was considered especially important for Colorado, as neither state had a preference primary and delegates were assigned at state and district conventions.

== District conventions ==
=== 1st and 6th district conventions ===
The district conventions for the 1st and 6th districts took place on April 2. The District 1 slate included former Secretary of State Scott Gessler, state Representative Justin Everett and Tony Sanchez, a candidate for state Senate. All three of the delegates were committed to Cruz- Gessler on the Cruz ticket and the other two on that of the Rocky Mountain Gun Owners. The District 6 slate included John Carson, Randy Corporon and Regina Thomson. All three delegates were on the official Cruz slate and were endorsed by Gun Owners of America.

=== 7th district convention ===
The district convention for the 7th district took place on April 7. Cruz exploited a superior ground game to push forward his slate of Anil Mathai, Libby Szabo and George Athanasopoulos, although only Szabo is officially pledged for Cruz. The 7th district was the first convention in which Trump supporters succeeded in assigning a slate of pledged delegates, although they were defeated by the Cruz supporters.

=== 2nd, 3rd, 4th and 5th district conventions ===
The district conventions for the 2nd, 3rd, 4th and 5th districts took place on April 8. The 3rd district, 4th district and 5th district district conventions all ended up with a full slate of Cruz-supporting delegates. These included Melanie Sturm, Anita Stapleton and Brita Horn in the 3rd district, Perry Buck, Guy Short and Kendal Unruh in the 4th district and Joel Crank, Robin Coran and Donald Olmstead in the 5th district. The 2nd district convention appointed one Cruz delegate, Robert Woodward, and two unpledged delegates, Michael McAlpine and Marty Neilson. The conventions were seen to be a large boost to Cruz, and Trump's sloppy organization was seen as a significant obstacle he would have to overcome in order to win the nomination.

== State convention ==
The state convention took place on April 9. Ted Cruz spoke directly at the state convention, whereas Donald Trump received an invitation but did not attend and John Kasich sent former Governor of New Hampshire John Sununu to speak on his behalf. Cruz took all 13 delegates at the state convention, completing a sweep of all 34 delegates in Colorado as well as the 3 unpledged RNC delegates (although 7 of them were officially uncommitted, they were all seen as leaning for Cruz.)

== Polling ==
Poll source	Date	1st	2nd	3rd	Other
Quinnipiac University Margin of error: ± 4.5% Sample size: 474	November 11–15, 2015	Ben Carson; 25%	Marco Rubio 19%	Donald Trump 17%	Ted Cruz 14%, Carly Fiorina 5%, Rand Paul 3%, Jeb Bush 2%, Chris Christie 1%, John Kasich 1%, Mike Huckabee 1%, Bobby Jindal 1%, Lindsey Graham 0%, Rick Santorum 0%, George Pataki 0%, Jim Gilmore 0%, DK/NA 11%
Suffolk University Margin of error: ± ?% Sample size: 205	September 2014	Rand Paul; 12.25%	Paul Ryan; 10.29%	Chris Christie/Mike Huckabee; 8.33%	Scott Walker 7.84%, Marco Rubio 7.35%, Jeb Bush 6.37%, Bobby Jindal 5.88%, Ted Cruz 5.39%, Rick Perry 5.39%, Rick Santorum 2.45%, John Huntsman 1.47%, John Kasich 0.49%, Refused 0.49%, Other 1.96%
Magellan Strategies Margin of error: ± 6% Sample size: 270	April 14–15, 2014	Rand Paul; 17%	Mike Huckabee; 16%	Ted Cruz; 14%	Chris Christie 12%, Marco Rubio 10%, Jeb Bush 9%, Scott Walker 8%, John Kasich 2%, Undecided 12%
Public Policy Polling Margin of error: ± 6.1% Sample size: 255	March 13–16, 2014	Ted Cruz; 17%	Mike Huckabee; 15%	Chris Christie; 14%	Rand Paul 10%, Paul Ryan 10%, Jeb Bush 8%, Marco Rubio 8%, Scott Walker 5%, Bobby Jindal 2%, Other/Undecided 11%
Public Policy Polling Margin of error: ± 5.2% Sample size: 355	December 3–4, 2013	Ted Cruz; 18%	Chris Christie; 17%	Rand Paul; 16%	Marco Rubio 10%, Paul Ryan 9%, Jeb Bush 8%, Scott Walker 6%, Bobby Jindal 3%, Rick Santorum 2%, Other/Undecided 11%

== Results ==
Colorado Republican district conventions, April 2, 2016, April 7–8, 2016
Candidate	Votes	Percentage	Actual delegate count		
Candidate	Votes	Percentage	Bound	Unbound	Total
Ted Cruz	0	0.0%	17	4	21
Donald Trump	0	0.0%	0	0	0
John Kasich	0	0.0%	0	0	0
Marco Rubio (withdrawn)	0	0.0%	0	0	0
Ben Carson (withdrawn)	0	0.0%	0	0	0
Uncommitted	0	0.0%	0	0	0
Unprojected delegates:			0	0	0
Total:	0	100.00%	17	4	21
Source: The Green Papers

Colorado Republican state convention, April 9, 2016
Candidate	Votes	Percentage	Actual delegate count		
Candidate	Votes	Percentage	Bound	Unbound	Total
Ted Cruz	0	0.0%	13	0	13
Donald Trump	0	0.0%	0	1	1
John Kasich	0	0.0%	0	0	0
Marco Rubio (withdrawn)	0	0.0%	0	0	0
Ben Carson (withdrawn)	0	0.0%	0	0	0
Uncommitted	0	0.0%	0	0	0
Unprojected delegates:			0	2	2
Total:	0	100.00%	13	3	16
Source: The Green Papers

== Future outlook ==
The Colorado result was considered to be a discouraging result for the Trump campaign, an encouraging result for "Stop Trump" forces and a strong predictor of how a contested convention would result. Further discouraging results for Trump came in the Wisconsin primary, which was held during the Colorado district conventions. Trump's lack of organization was apparent in the fact that his campaign surrogates failed to create a delegate slate until the third district convention. A contested convention would be similar to a district convention in the need for a strong ground game and winning over unbound delegates, similar to the Colorado process.

== See also ==
- 2016 Colorado Democratic caucuses
