= 2016 New York Republican presidential primary =

- April 19, 2016

95 pledged delegates to the 2016 Republican National Convention
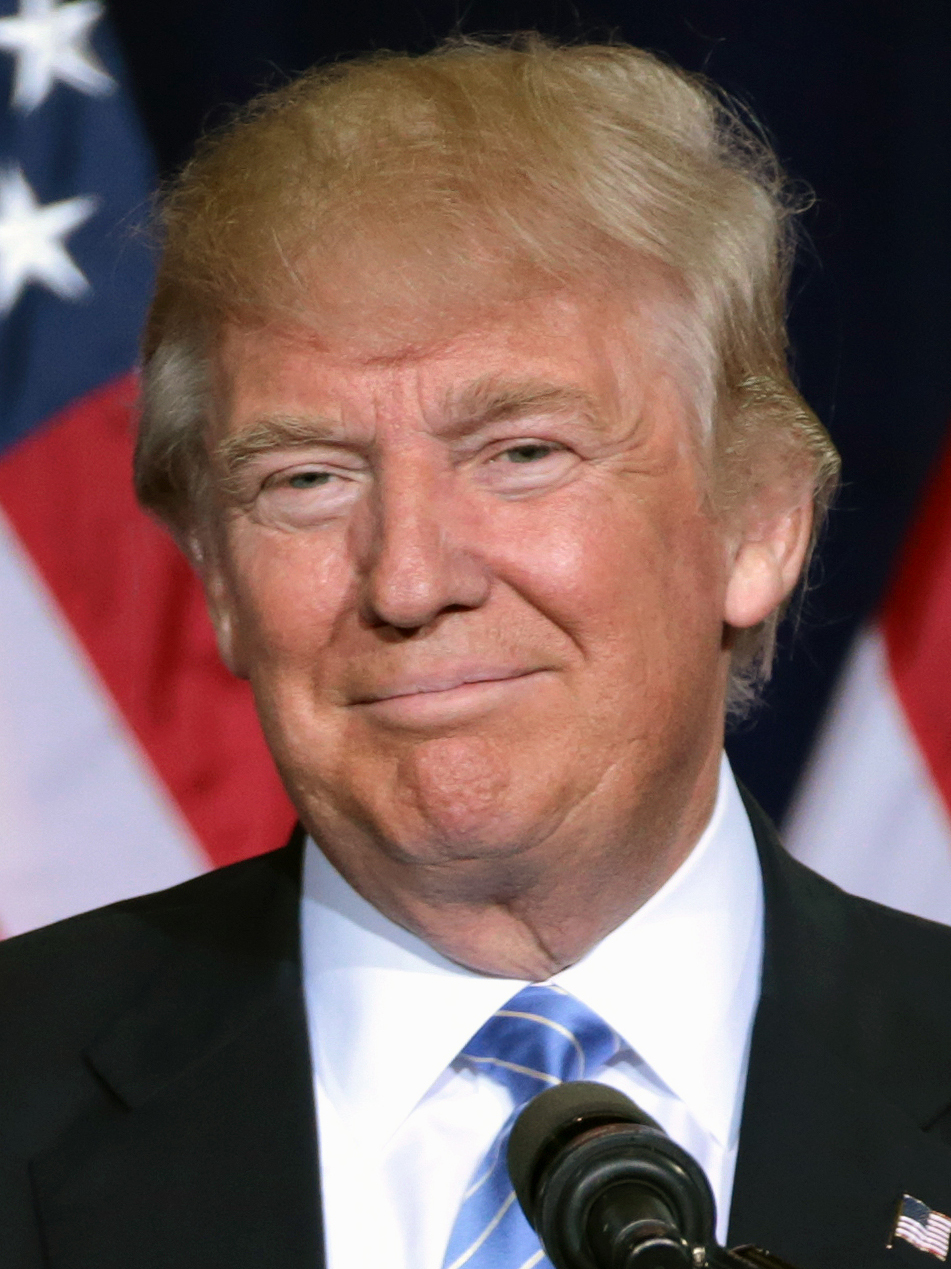

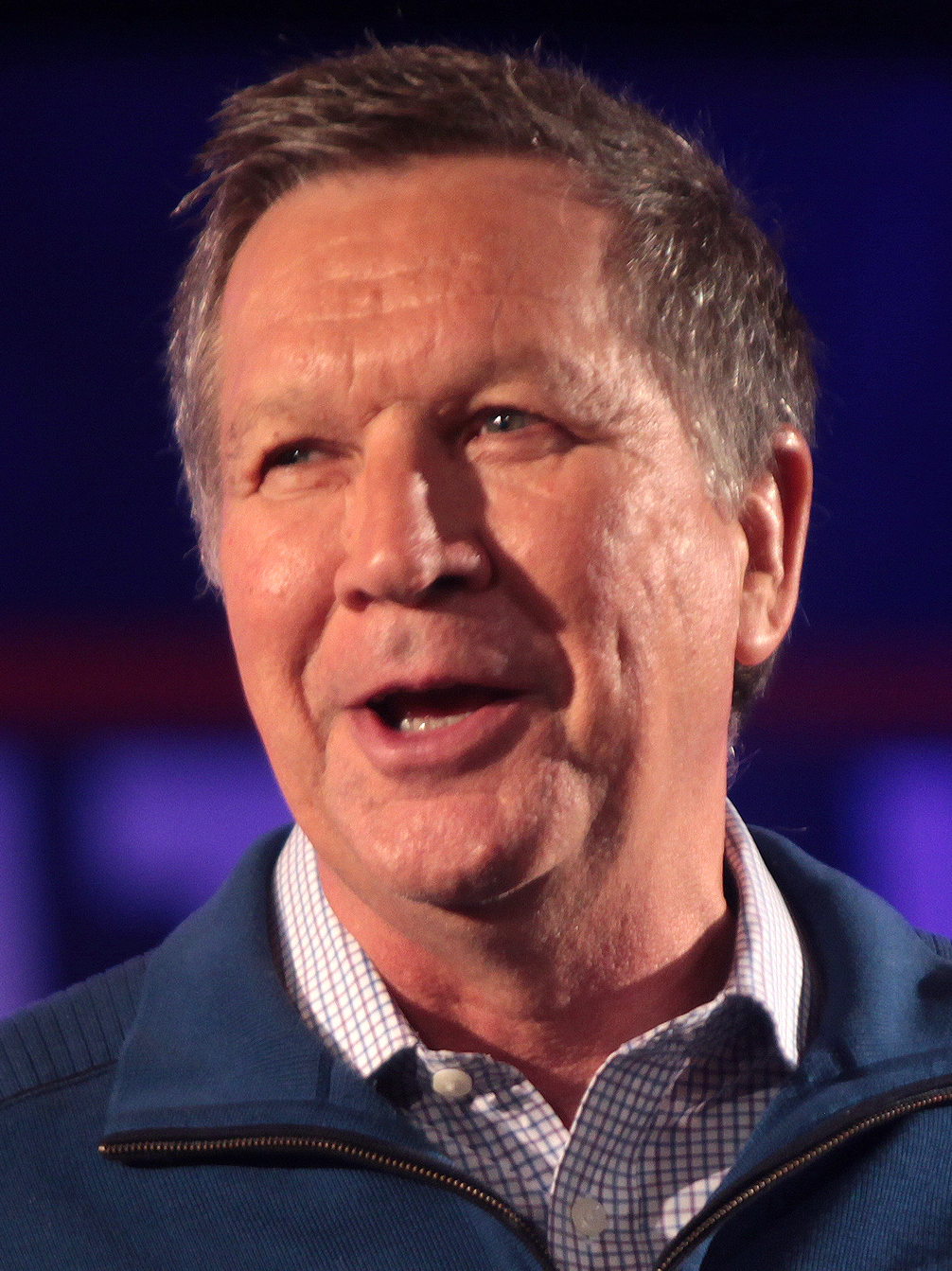

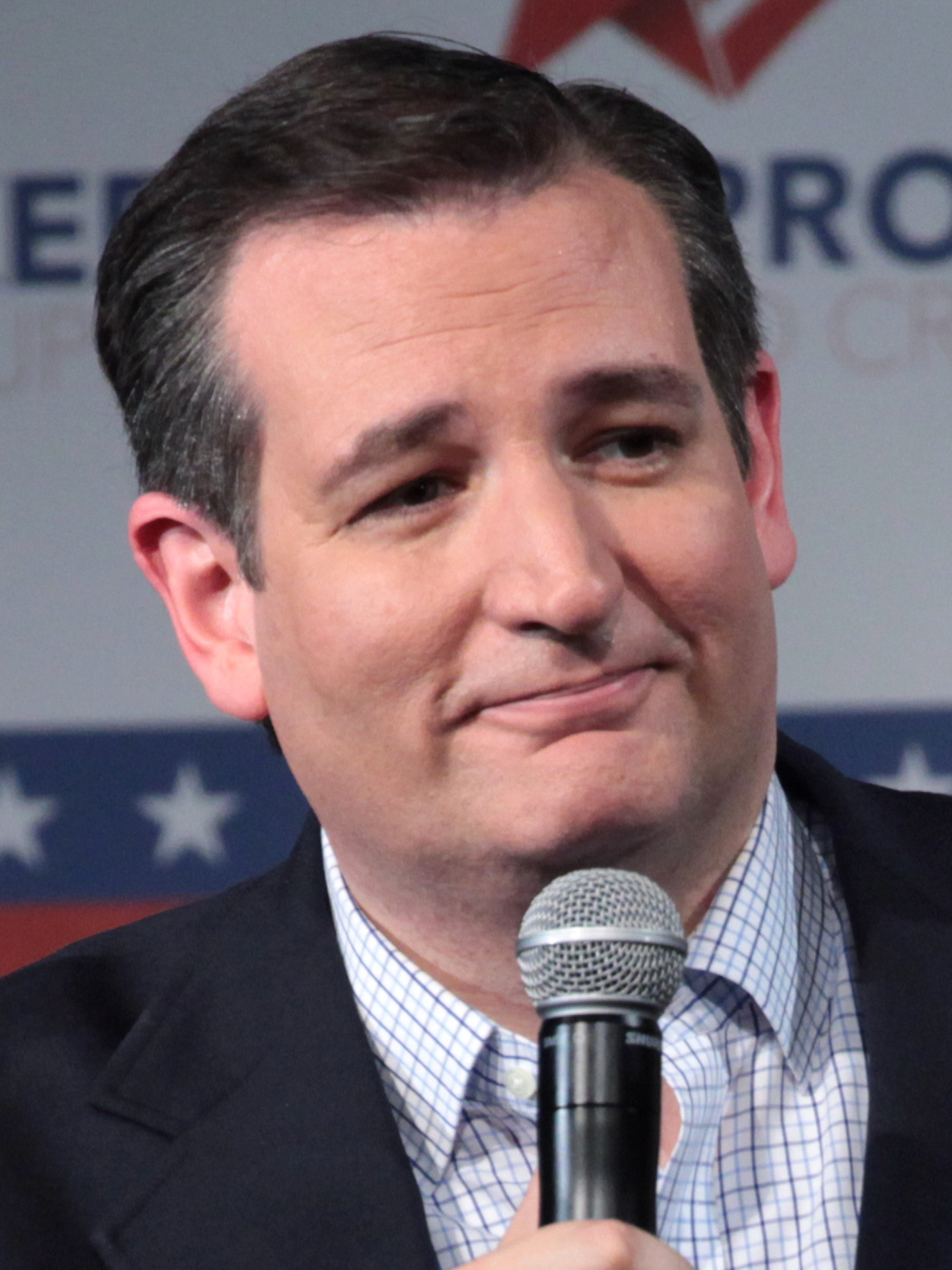
Candidate	Donald Trump	John Kasich	Ted Cruz
Home state	New York	Ohio	Texas
Delegate count	89	6	0
Popular vote	554,522	231,166	136,083
Percentage	59.21%	24.68%	14.53%

Donald Trump
30–40%
40–50%
50–60%
60–70%
70–80%
80–90%
John Kasich
30–40%
40–50%
50–60%
Tie
30%

The 2016 New York Republican presidential primary was held on April 19 in the U.S. state of New York as one of the Republican Party's primaries ahead of the 2016 presidential election.

Donald Trump won his home state with 59% of the vote and picked up 89 pledged delegates. He won over all age groups, income levels and political ideologies, with most voters saying they want a candidate who "can bring change" and "tells it like it is". Most voters supported Trump's proposed ban on Muslim immigration to the United States.

The Democratic Party also held their own New York primary on the same day which was won by Hillary Clinton. Apart from that, no other primaries were scheduled for that day by either party.

== Background ==
=== National campaign ===
Despite an early victory by Ted Cruz in the Iowa caucuses, Donald Trump was seen as making steady progress towards the Republican nomination at the time. Trump was victorious in 7 of the contests on March 1, with Cruz seen as the only viable threat to Trump after victories in his home state of Texas and 2 other March 1 contests. Marco Rubio performed worse than anticipated on March 1, taking only Minnesota. On March 8, two primaries and a caucus were held in Hawaii, Michigan and Mississippi. Despite a poll from American Research Group that showed Kasich leading Trump in Michigan, Trump won all three contests.

On March 15's primaries, Donald Trump took four of the five contests- Florida, Illinois, Missouri and North Carolina. Trump however was defeated in Ohio by John Kasich, losing all 66 of the state's delegates. Marco Rubio suspended his campaign after losing the Florida contest, leaving just Cruz and Kasich in the race to oppose Trump.

On March 22, Trump won the Arizona contest and all of its 58 pledged delegates, while Cruz capitalized on Trump's comments critical of Mitt Romney's Mormon faith to take the state of Utah and its 40 delegates.

The month of April brought several strong performances for Cruz. He capitalized on a weak ground game in the Donald Trump campaign to win the conventions in North Dakota and Colorado, despite criticism from Donald Trump. In addition, Ted Cruz won the valuable Wisconsin primary and with it 36 of the state's 42 delegates. Many considered the probability of a "contested" Republican National Convention as it was considered doubtful that Trump would receive the requisite 1,237 delegates.

=== New York campaign ===
Being Donald Trump's home state, New York was expected to be one of his strongest states in the primary contests. While Trump himself said that he would be satisfied with only one half of the delegates, most prognosticators said that Trump would have to perform extremely strongly in the state in order to avoid a contested convention. Ted Cruz's attacks in a Fox Business Network primary debate in South Carolina, criticizing Donald Trump for holding what he referred to as "New York values"- meaning the liberal, left leaning values of New York City came under fire as Cruz was campaigning in New York as well. This, combined with Trump's strong performances in the Northeast, especially Massachusetts, meant that Trump was considered a favorite with Kasich as his main challenger.

== Opinion polling ==
List of polls
Main article: United States presidential election in New York, 2016

Winner: Donald Trump
Primary date: April 19, 2016

Poll source	Date	1st	2nd	3rd	Other
Primary results	April 19, 2016	Donald Trump; 59.21%	John Kasich; 24.68%	Ted Cruz; 14.53%	
Emerson College Margin of error: ± 5.11% Sample size: 361	April 15 – 17, 2016	Donald Trump; 55%	John Kasich; 21%	Ted Cruz; 18%	Undecided 5%
CBS News/YouGov Margin of error: ± 5.9% Sample size: 705	April 13 – 15, 2016	Donald Trump; 54%	Ted Cruz; 21%	John Kasich; 19%	Undecided 6%
Optimus Margin of error: ± 0.822% Sample size: 14201	April 11 – 14, 2016	Donald Trump; 49%	John Kasich; 23%	Ted Cruz; 14%	Undecided 14%
NBC News/WSJ/Marist Margin of error: ± 5.5% Sample size: 313	April 10 – 13, 2016	Donald Trump; 54%	John Kasich; 25%	Ted Cruz; 16%	Undecided 5%
Siena College Margin of error: ± 5% Sample size: 469	April 6 – 11, 2016	Donald Trump; 50%	John Kasich; 27%	Ted Cruz; 17%	Other 6%
Quinnipiac University Margin of error: ± 4.2% Sample size: 550	April 6 – 11, 2016	Donald Trump; 55%	John Kasich; 20%	Ted Cruz; 19%	Undecided 6%
Public Policy Polling Margin of error: ± 4.5% Sample size: 483	April 7 – 10, 2016	Donald Trump; 51%	John Kasich; 25%	Ted Cruz; 20%	Undecided 4%
NBC News/WSJ/Marist Margin of error: ± 6.1% Sample size: 259	April 6 – 10, 2016	Donald Trump; 54%	John Kasich; 21%	Ted Cruz; 18%	Undecided 5%, Other 1%
Baruch College/New York 1 Margin of error: ± 5.8% Sample size: 324	April 5 – 10, 2016	Donald Trump; 60%	John Kasich; 17%	Ted Cruz; 14%	Undecided 7%, Refused 2%
Liberty Research Margin of error: ± 3.0% Sample size: 6041	April 6 – 7, 2016	Donald Trump; 52%	John Kasich; 23%	Ted Cruz; 19%	Undecided 6%
Emerson College Margin of error: ± 5.4% Sample size: 321	April 6 – 7, 2016	Donald Trump; 56%	Ted Cruz; 22%	John Kasich; 17%	Undecided 4%, Other 1%
Fox News Margin of error: ± 4% Sample size: 602	April 4 – 7, 2016	Donald Trump; 54%	John Kasich; 22%	Ted Cruz; 15%	Undecided 6%, Other 1%
Monmouth University Margin of error: ± 5.6% Sample size: 302	April 3 – 5, 2016	Donald Trump; 52%	John Kasich; 25%	Ted Cruz; 17%	Undecided 6%
CBS News/YouGov Margin of error: ± 5.6% Sample size: 657	March 29-April 1, 2016	Donald Trump; 52%	Ted Cruz; 21%	John Kasich; 20%	Other/Undecided 7%
Quinnipiac University Margin of error: ± 4.6% Sample size: 457	March 22 – 29, 2016	Donald Trump; 56%	Ted Cruz; 20%	John Kasich; 19%	Undecided 4%
Liberty Research Margin of error: ± 3% Sample size: 1795	March 24 – 26, 2016	Donald Trump; 55%	John Kasich; 22%	Ted Cruz; 19%	Undecided 4%
Optimus Margin of error: ± 0.8% Sample size: 14232	March 22 – 24, 2016	Donald Trump; 47%	John Kasich; 22%	Ted Cruz; 15%	Undecided 16%
Emerson College Margin of error: ± 5.6% Sample size: 298	March 14 – 16, 2016	Donald Trump; 64%	Ted Cruz; 12%	John Kasich; 1%	Other 19%, Undecided 1%
Siena College Margin of error: ± 6.7% Sample size: 229	February 28 – March 3, 2016	Donald Trump; 45%	Marco Rubio; 18%	John Kasich; 18%	Ted Cruz 11%, Other 1%, Undecided 7%
Siena College Margin of error: ± 7.0% Sample size: 235	January 31 – February 3, 2016	Donald Trump; 34%	Ted Cruz; 16%	Marco Rubio; 16%	Chris Christie 11%, Jeb Bush 7%, John Kasich 4%, Someone else 2%, Don't know/No opinion 10%
Siena College Margin of error: ± 6.7% Sample size: 214	September 14–17, 2015	Donald Trump; 34%	Ben Carson; 14%	Jeb Bush; 11%	Chris Christie 9%, Carly Fiorina 8%, Marco Rubio 5%, John Kasich 4%, Ted Cruz 3%, George Pataki 3%, Scott Walker 0%, Other 1%, None of them 5%, Undecided 5%
Quinnipiac University Margin of error: ± 5.2% Sample size: 356	May 28 – June 1, 2015	George Pataki; 11%	Marco Rubio; 11%	Jeb Bush; 10%	Scott Walker 7%, Ben Carson 6%, Chris Christie 6%, Rand Paul 6%, Donald Trump 6%, Mike Huckabee 5%, Ted Cruz 3%, Carly Fiorina 3%, Rick Santorum 2%, Bobby Jindal 1%, John Kasich 1%, Rick Perry 1%, Lindsey Graham 0%, DK/NA 14%, Wouldn't vote 3%, Someone else 1%
Siena College Margin of error: ± 6.6% Sample size: 223	April 19–23, 2015	Chris Christie; 25%	Jeb Bush; 20%	Marco Rubio; 9%	Rand Paul 8%, Ted Cruz 6%, Other 8%, Undecided 24%
Quinnipiac University Margin of error: ± 5.4% Sample size: 327	March 11–16, 2015	Jeb Bush; 13%	Scott Walker; 13%	Chris Christie; 12%	Marco Rubio 10%, Rand Paul 8%, Ben Carson 6%, George Pataki 6%, Ted Cruz 3%, Mike Huckabee 3%, Bobby Jindal 1%, John Kasich 1%, Rick Perry 1%, Rick Santorum 1%, Lindsey Graham 0%, Other 1%, Wouldn't vote 3%, Undecided 18%
Marist College Margin of error: ± 7.6% Sample size: 167	November 18–20, 2013	Chris Christie; 40%	Rand Paul; 10%	Marco Rubio; 10%	Jeb Bush 8%, Paul Ryan 5%, Ted Cruz 3%, Rick Perry 3%, Scott Walker 3%, Susana Martinez 2%, Rick Santorum 2%, Undecided 15%

== Results ==
New York Republican primary, April 19, 2016
Candidate	Votes	Percentage	Actual delegate count		
Candidate	Votes	Percentage	Bound	Unbound	Total
Donald Trump	554,522	59.21%	89	0	89
John Kasich	231,166	24.68%	6	0	6
Ted Cruz	136,083	14.53%	0	0	0
Blank & Void	14,756	1.58%	0	0	0
Unprojected delegates:			0	0	0
Total:	936,527	100.00%	95	0	95
Source: The Green Papers

Of the 62 counties in the state, Donald Trump won 61, with the one loss being his home county of New York County (Manhattan), where John Kasich won. Trump's strongest showings were in Richmond County (Staten Island), Nassau County, Queens, Suffolk County and Erie County. John Kasich won Manhattan with a plurality and placed a strong second in upstate college areas such as Cortland, Syracuse and the Capital District area centered around Albany.

Ultimately, Trump was able to get the full slate of delegates in 22 out of 27 congressional districts, due to meeting or exceeding the 50% threshold in each. Kasich won 2 delegates in the 12th district (Upper East Side Manhattan/Queens), and one each in the 10th (Jewish Manhattan/Brooklyn neighborhoods), 13th (Harlem), 20th (Albany), and 24th (Syracuse) districts. Ted Cruz won 14.5% of the vote but did not win any delegates.

=== Results by county ===
County	Carson*	%	Cruz	%	Kasich	%	Trump	%	BVS	Total	Turnout	MV%
Albany	150	1.04%	2,390	16.58%	5,026	34.87%	6,793	41.13%	55	14,414	41.25%	12.26%
Allegany	156	2.93%	1,159	21.74%	1,175	22.05%	2,827	53.04%	13	5,330	43.63%	30.99%
Bronx	127	1.75%	1,164	16.00%	1,148	15.78%	4,730	65.00%	108	7,277	19.57%	49.00%
Broome	286	1.55%	3,953	21.45%	5,138	27.88%	8,923	48.42%	130	18,430	45.32%	20.54%
Cattaraugus	113	1.74%	1,298	19.97%	1,419	21.83%	3,636	55.93%	35	6,501	38.22%	31.10%
Cayuga	70	1.13%	1,136	18.38%	1,942	31.42%	3,024	48.92%	9	6,181	37.92%	17.51%
Chautauqua	177	1.85%	2,016	21.08%	2,294	23.99%	5,027	52.57%	49	9,563	38.35%	28.58%
Chemung		N/A	1,820	21.16%	2,372	27.58%	4,208	48.92%	201	8,601	42.99%	21.35%
Chenango	87	1.64%	1,133	21.31%	1,394	26.22%	2,659	50.02%	43	5,316	43.33%	23.80%
Clinton		N/A	739	15.77%	1,389	29.64%	2,487	53.06%	72	4,687	33.05%	23.43%
Columbia	63	1.32%	744	15.62%	1,271	26.68%	2,662	55.88%	24	4,764	40.46%	29.20%
Cortland		N/A	900	22.66%	1,276	32.13%	1,710	43.06%	85	3,971	41.05%	10.93%
Delaware	91	1.85%	846	17.19%	1,142	23.21%	2,831	57.53%	11	4,921	42.63%	34.32%
Dutchess	213	1.05%	2,840	13.94%	4,401	21.60%	12,872	63.18%	46	20,372	40.07%	41.58%
Erie		N/A	7,964	12.93%	13,136	21.33%	39,589	64.27%	907	61,596	42.04%	42.95%
Essex	68	1.71%	664	16.72%	1,274	32.07%	1,918	48.29%	48	3,972	36.82%	16.21%
Franklin	62	2.27%	433	15.83%	763	27.90%	1,460	53.38%	17	2,735	32.34%	25.48%
Fulton	72	1.17%	1,036	16.85%	1,552	25.24%	3,456	56.20%	34	6,150	39.59%	30.96%
Genesee		N/A	1,032	16.54%	1,282	20.54%	3,815	61.13%	112	6,241	40.16%	40.59%
Greene		N/A	705	16.39%	838	19.48%	2,689	62.52%	69	4,301	37.08%	43.04%
Hamilton		N/A	210	18.77%	326	29.13%	565	50.49%	18	1,119	44.89%	21.36%
Herkimer	107	1.47%	1,042	14.35%	1,877	25.85%	4,193	57.75%	42	7,261	41.32%	31.90%
Jefferson	121	1.28%	1,235	13.10%	2,860	30.34%	5,190	55.07%	19	9,425	41.69%	24.72%
Kings (Brooklyn)	255	1.01%	4,872	19.32%	4,024	15.96%	15,920	63.14%	144	25,215	25.12%	43.82%
Lewis	71	2.29%	476	15.36%	898	28.99%	1,643	53.03%	10	3,098	36.49%	24.05%
Livingston	116	1.62%	1,329	18.54%	1,724	24.05%	3,957	55.20%	43	7,169	43.60%	31.15%
Madison		N/A	1,358	19.87%	2,214	32.39%	3,108	45.47%	155	6,835	43.72%	13.08%
Monroe	685	1.24%	9,537	17.23%	16,870	30.47%	28,034	50.63%	239	55,365	43.98%	20.16%
Montgomery	42	1.12%	793	21.15%	865	23.07%	2,039	54.39%	10	3,749	39.85%	31.32%
Nassau		N/A	9,902	9.54%	22,722	21.90%	69,692	67.17%	1,437	103,753	32.35%	45.27%
New York (Manhattan)	254	0.93%	3,586	13.08%	12,181	44.43%	11,196	40.84%	198	27,415	32.30%	-3.59%
Niagara	245	1.40%	2,406	13.78%	3,321	19.02%	11,450	65.56%	43	17,465	41.26%	46.54%
Oneida	252	1.23%	3,335	16.33%	5,398	26.44%	11,332	55.50%	102	20,419	43.10%	29.06%
Onondaga	307	0.91%	6,075	17.97%	12,055	35.67%	15,155	44.84%	207	33,799	41.76%	9.17%
Ontario	180	1.60%	2,061	18.37%	3,380	30.13%	5,558	49.55%	39	11,218	43.02%	19.42%
Orange	217	0.89%	3,120	12.75%	4,372	17.87%	16,659	68.07%	104	24,472	35.94%	50.21%
Orleans	61	1.45%	720	16.65%	799	18.95%	2,643	62.69%	11	4,216	40.68%	43.74%
Oswego	188	1.57%	2,026	16.88%	3,285	27.37%	6,423	53.52%	80	12,002	38.57%	26.15%
Otsego	96	1.78%	1,035	19.20%	1,516	28.12%	2,719	50.43%	26	5,392	41.92%	22.31%
Putnam	61	0.70%	986	11.36%	1,587	18.28%	6,027	69.44%	19	8,680	40.96%	51.15%
Queens	342	1.08%	4,495	14.20%	5,601	17.69%	20,951	66.18%	268	31,657	27.36%	48.49%
Rensselaer	100	1.10%	1,576	17.27%	2,600	28.48%	4,758	52.13%	94	9,128	38.70%	23.64%
Richmond (Staten Island)	120	0.45%	2,096	7.90%	2,690	10.14%	21,521	81.09%	114	26,541	34.76%	70.95%
Rockland	104	0.70%	2,367	15.92%	3,158	21.24%	9,219	62.00%	21	14,869	34.71%	40.76%
St. Lawrence	124	1.74%	1,074	15.04%	2,036	28.52%	3,825	53.58%	80	7,139	36.07%	25.06%
Saratoga	240	0.97%	4,404	17.85%	8,272	33.52%	11,673	47.30%	88	24,677	41.91%	13.78%
Schenectady		N/A	2,010	20.93%	2,946	30.67%	4,496	46.81%	152	9,604	41.32%	16.14%
Schoharie		N/A	640	22.74%	638	22.66%	1,497	53.18%	40	2,815	39.99%	30.44%
Schuyler	42	2.21%	405	21.35%	461	24.30%	979	51.61%	10	1,897	40.85%	27.31%
Seneca	56	1.85%	521	17.21%	854	28.20%	1,585	52.34%	12	3,028	40.86%	24.14%
Steuben	262	2.24%	2,401	20.50%	2,755	23.52%	6,252	53.37%	44	11,714	42.09%	29.85%
Suffolk	735	0.73%	9,099	9.01%	18,694	18.52%	72,359	71.67%	77	100,964	34.15%	53.15%
Sullivan		N/A	534	13.19%	687	16.98%	2,742	67.75%	84	4,047	33.08%	50.78%
Tioga	126	2.09%	1,429	23.68%	1,546	25.62%	2,926	48.48%	8	6,035	44.66%	22.87%
Tompkins	105	2.11%	1,342	26.96%	1,691	33.98%	1,821	36.59%	18	4,977	42.82%	2.61%
Ulster	142	1.41%	1,332	13.19%	2,197	21.75%	6,388	63.24%	43	10,102	36.63%	41.49%
Warren	101	1.28%	1,206	15.28%	2,772	35.12%	3,761	47.64%	54	7,894	42.15%	12.53%
Washington	7	0.13%	1,048	19.15%	1,839	33.61%	2,458	44.92%	120	5,472	37.60%	11.31%
Wayne		N/A	1,627	19.99%	2,016	24.77%	4,472	54.94%	156	8,271	38.12%	30.17%
Westchester	376	0.83%	5,245	11.59%	13,599	30.06%	25,880	57.20%	147	45,247	35.31%	27.14%
Wyoming		N/A	749	17.40%	724	16.82%	2,752	63.94%	79	4,304	40.10%	46.54%
Yates	43	1.56%	425	15.44%	884	32.11%	1,388	50.42%	13	2,753	43.29%	18.31%
Total	8,018*	0.86%	136,083	14.53%	231,166	24.69%	554,522	59.22%	6,636	936,525	36.35%	34.53%

*Note: Blank, void, and scattering (BVS) votes include some votes for former candidate Ben Carson.

=== Results by congressional district ===
CD	Carson	Cruz	Kasich	Trump	BVS	Total	TO%	MV%
1	0	4,972	9,307	38,802	426	53,507	34.94%	55.12%
2	0	3,820	8,273	35,902	461	48,456	32.07%	57.02%
3	17	4,315	11,271	31,642	339	47,584	32.42%	42.81%
4	0	5,936	12,701	36,530	910	56,077	33.58%	42.49%
5	80	1,215	1,361	5,234	113	8,003	24.69%	48.39%
6	123	1,947	2,388	8,817	0	13,275	27.29%	48.43%
7	73	771	1,073	2,117	0	4,034	20.43%	25.88%
8	81	773	836	5,217	0	6,907	25.48%	63.43%
9	67	1,412	1,034	3,499	0	6,012	23.64%	34.71%
10	98	2,720	4,507	5,716	0	13,041	31.29%	9.27%
11	155	2,669	3,462	25,617	114	32,017	32.78%	69.20%
12	129	2,103	7,836	7,712	0	17,780	33.80%	−0.70%
13	82	624	800	1,408	0	2,914	17.87%	20.86%
14	106	1,065	1,297	5,348	0	7,816	25.37%	51.83%
15	53	287	156	690	0	1,186	8.94%	33.98%
16	201	2,491	6,142	11,651	56	20,541	32.80%	26.82%
17	278	4,755	9,101	21,206	92	35,432	35.35%	34.16%
18	418	6,273	10,134	32,869	136	49,830	37.83%	45.63%
19	575	8,400	11,998	30,550	302	51,825	38.20%	35.80%
20	335	7,903	14,618	21,276	213	44,345	41.34%	15.01%
21	772	10,285	19,424	32,607	476	63,564	38.47%	20.74%
22	865	12,721	18,515	34,322	543	66,966	43.00%	23.60%
23	1,116	13,061	16,086	31,742	406	62,411	41.27%	25.09%
24	377	9,950	17,961	26,073	508	54,869	40.22%	14.78%
25	644	8,967	15,952	26,211	237	52,011	43.80%	19.72%
26	55	4,698	7,852	22,270	521	35,396	40.45%	40.73%
27	525	11,389	16,259	47,151	626	75,950	42.91%	40.67%
	7,225	135,522	230,344	552,179	6,479	931,749	36.50%	34.54%

=== New York City results ===
2016 Republican Primary	Manhattan	The Bronx	Brooklyn	Queens	Staten Island	Total
Donald Trump	11,196	4,730	15,920	20,951	21,521	74,318
Donald Trump	40.84%	65.00%	63.14%	66.18%	81.09%	62.93%
John Kasich	12,181	1,148	4,024	5,601	2,690	25,644
John Kasich	44.43%	15.78%	15.96%	17.69%	10.14%	21.71%
Ted Cruz	3,586	1,164	4,872	4,495	2,096	16,213
Ted Cruz	13.08%	16.00%	19.32%	14.20%	7.90%	13.73%
Ben Carson	254	127	255	342	120	1,098
Ben Carson	0.93%	1.75%	1.01%	1.08%	0.45%	0.93%
Blank, Void	198	108	144	268	114	832
Blank, Void	0.72%	1.48%	0.57%	0.85%	0.43%	0.70%
TOTAL	27,415	7,277	25,215	31,657	26,541	118,105
TURNOUT	32.30%	19.57%	25.12%	27.36%	34.76%	28.49%

== See also ==
- 2016 New York Democratic presidential primary
