= America (advertisement) =

2016 Bernie Sanders political advertisement

- Language: English
- Running time: 1:00
- Release dates: January 21, 2016 (original); April 7, 2016 (New York version)
- Music by: "America" by Simon & Garfunkel
- Country: United States

"America" is an American political advertisement released by the 2016 presidential campaign of Bernie Sanders. It premiered on January 21, 2016, via YouTube, and first aired on televisions in Iowa and New Hampshire shortly before the Democratic Iowa caucus and New Hampshire primary. On April 7, 2016, another version of the ad for New York was premiered on YouTube. It was aired on television stations in New York before the New York State primaries took place, though with some changes.

== Content ==
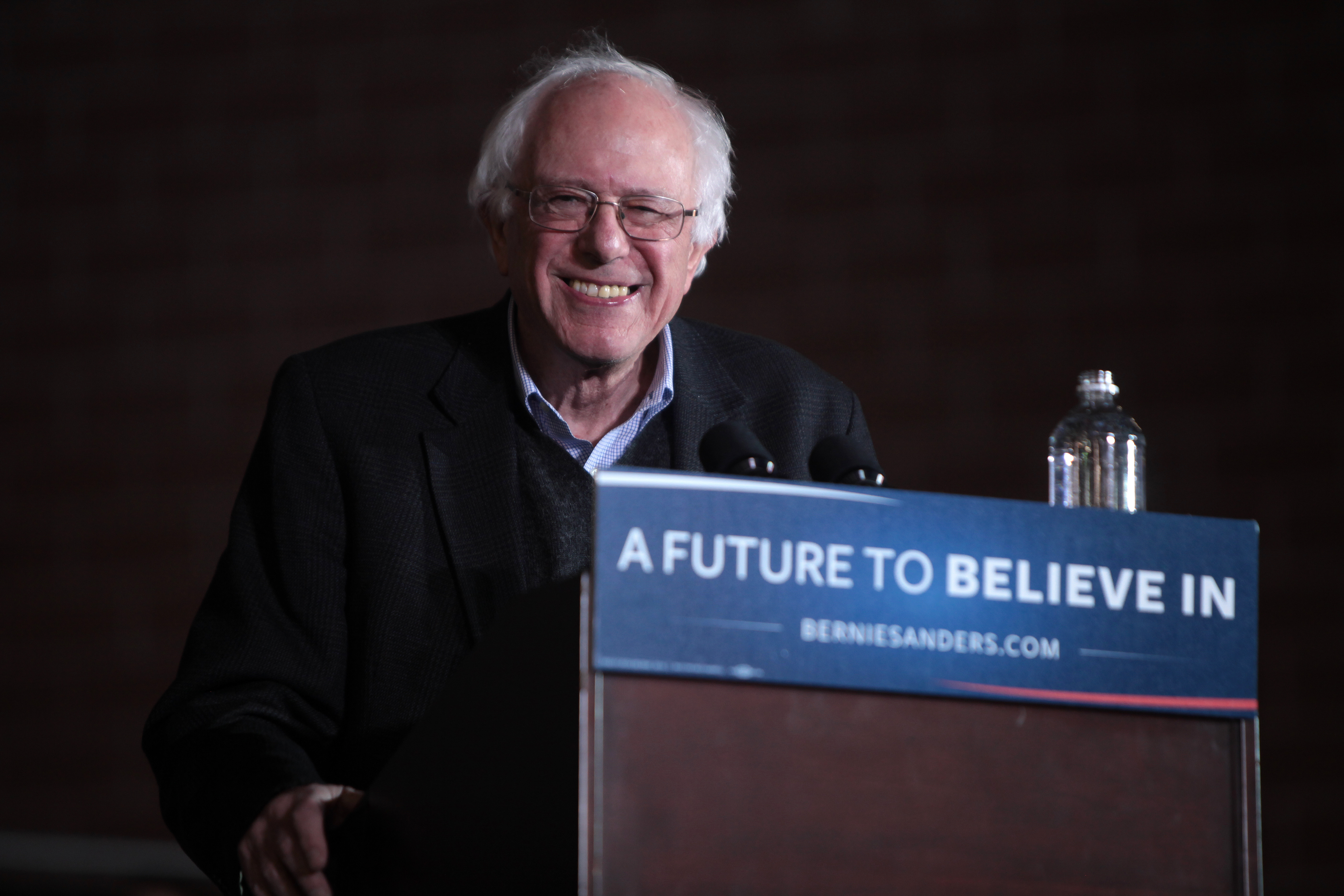
Sanders in January 2016

The advertisement features "America", a song recorded by Simon & Garfunkel for their album Bookends (1968).

The ad starts with scenes of everyday American life over soft humming and gentle guitar strumming. As the line "let us be lovers, we'll marry our fortunes together" plays in the background, a middle-aged couple dances at a small Bernie Sanders for President rally. Then, Sanders is seen speaking to a few people in a backyard. As the ad continues, the crowds grow larger and more enthusiastic. A montage of many Sanders supporters appear, as the words "They've all come to look for America" flash on the screen. Sanders is then seen addressing a large outdoor gathering, interacting one-on-one with supporters, appearing before more energetic crowds, finally ending in a large auditorium filled to capacity with cheering people.

American flags appear frequently throughout the ad. The Sanders campaign paraphernalia is predominantly blue, which is associated with the Democratic party. However, the color red, which is associated with the opposition Republican party, appears as an accent color in almost every shot.

The closing scene shows Sanders standing at a lectern on a stage as supporters applaud behind him.

In the New York version, some scenes were replaced with scenes in New York (including the New Jersey turnpike) while also continued to add different scenes of everyday American life in the opening scene.

== Production ==
The commercial was created by the advertising firm of Devine, Mulvey, Longabaugh. Use of the song was licensed by Simon and Garfunkel; licensing does not imply endorsement of the Sanders campaign. Garfunkel explained his reasons for permitting the campaign use of his song.

In an interview with Politico, two months after the ad debuted, Sanders advisor Tad Devine, attributing the original idea for the ad to fellow Sanders advisor Mark Longabaugh, said that this, the "best known" Sanders ad, worked so well because Sanders' wife, Jane, had seen an early cut and said: ‘Gee, I really love this, but when Bernie comes in it seems — you know, it loses a lot of altitude,’" causing the team to produce an ad that does not show Sanders making a speech until the final frame, and, thereby, an ad that shows the people Sanders is working for, not the candidate.

== Reception ==
The New York Times pointed out that Bernie Sanders was 74 years old when the ad was released, the same age as Paul Simon and Art Garfunkel, and described the ad as "powerful" and "a love song to America." Rolling Stone called the ad "inspirational", The Hill called it "magnificent", Charlie Pierce said it was "just about the best political commercial I've ever seen", CNN praised it for being "so full of love, enthusiasm and patriotic uplift (complete with flag-waving) that it's downright goose bump-inducing", and Financial Times postulated that the ad would soften Sanders' "cantankerous, angry old man image."

The New York Times discusses the ad as part of Sanders' insistence that he is leading not a campaign, but a "movement", and predicts that the ad will stand out in a year filled with campaign ads "cluttered with deep-voiced narrators delivering somber warnings, harsh attacks and swaggering boasts", contrasting it in particular with a Hillary Clinton campaign ad released the same week.

The ad, created to be shown in the early caucus and primary in Iowa and New Hampshire (predominantly white and rural states), was criticized for showing a mostly white, rural America, with Clinton supporter David Brock asserting the ad shows "black lives don't matter much to Bernie Sanders."

=== Cultural impact ===
The original version of the ad received a million views on YouTube within 24 hours of being posted there. It made the AdWeek list of top-ten most-watched advertisement for January 2016, and a panel put together by the magazine in late February describe it as the "most successful" ad in the Democratic campaign to date, attributing the success to the fact that it taps into "what people are feeling" and "concerns possibilities and optimism."

According to Amy E. Jasperson, who chairs the department of political science department at Rhodes College, the ad is powerful because "[t]he song starts out slowly while the ad shows individual images of small towns, urban landscapes, ordinary people, farmers, and families... as the song builds, the people are brought together. By the end of the ad and the song, the viewer hears and sees the crescendo of huge, cheering, unified crowds." According to Jaserperson, "the aspirational lyrics and tone also reference a common search for where people feel we should be going as a country... This ad suggests that Sanders can lead people to that answer."

Wired cites it as a leading example of the kind of alternative, online material that is proving more influential than traditional television ads in the 2016 campaign. While Bill McKibben cites it as evidence of why the impact of the Sanders campaign will "endure."
