= 2016 Wyoming Republican presidential caucuses =

- February 16 – April 16, 2016
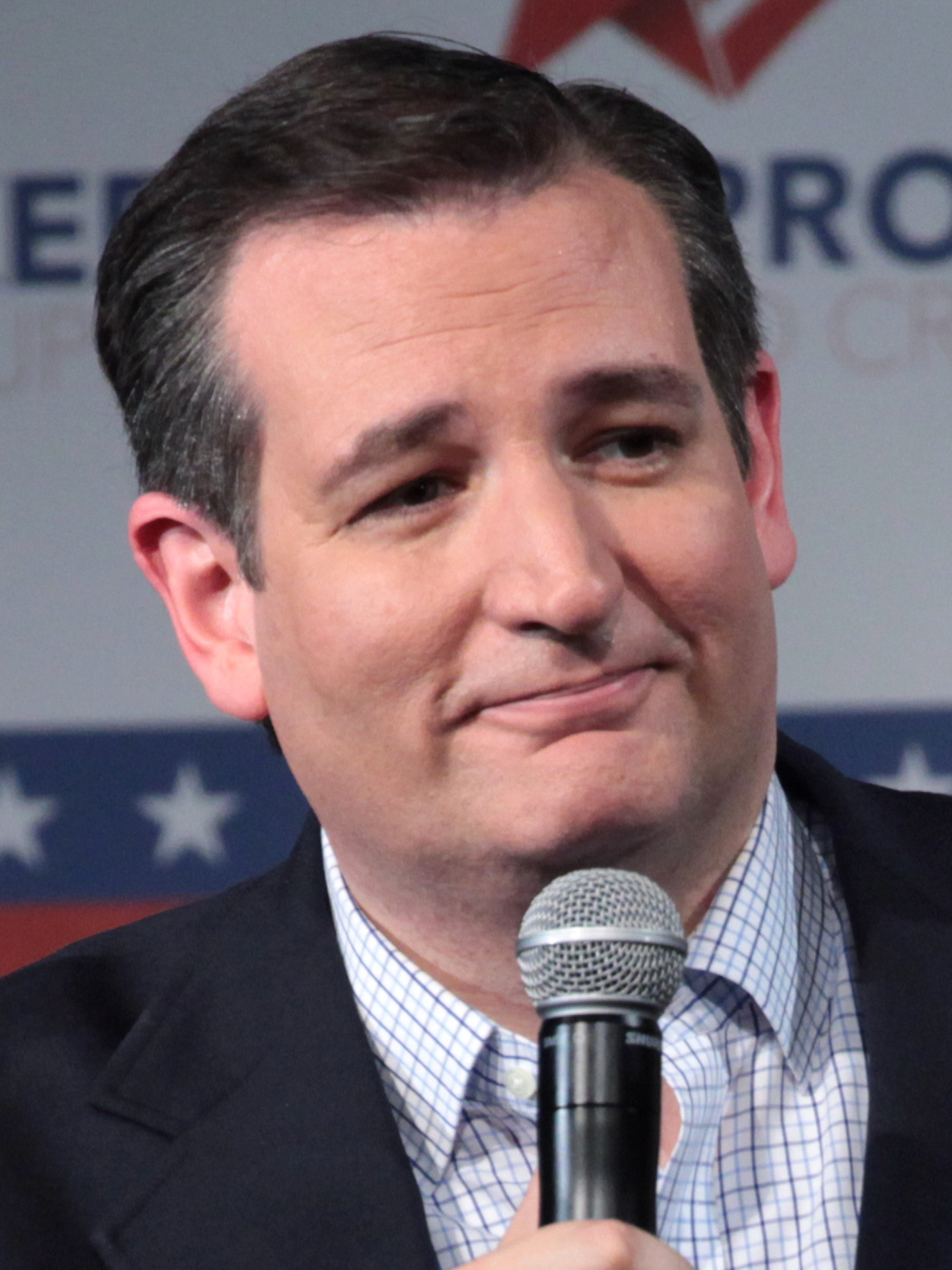

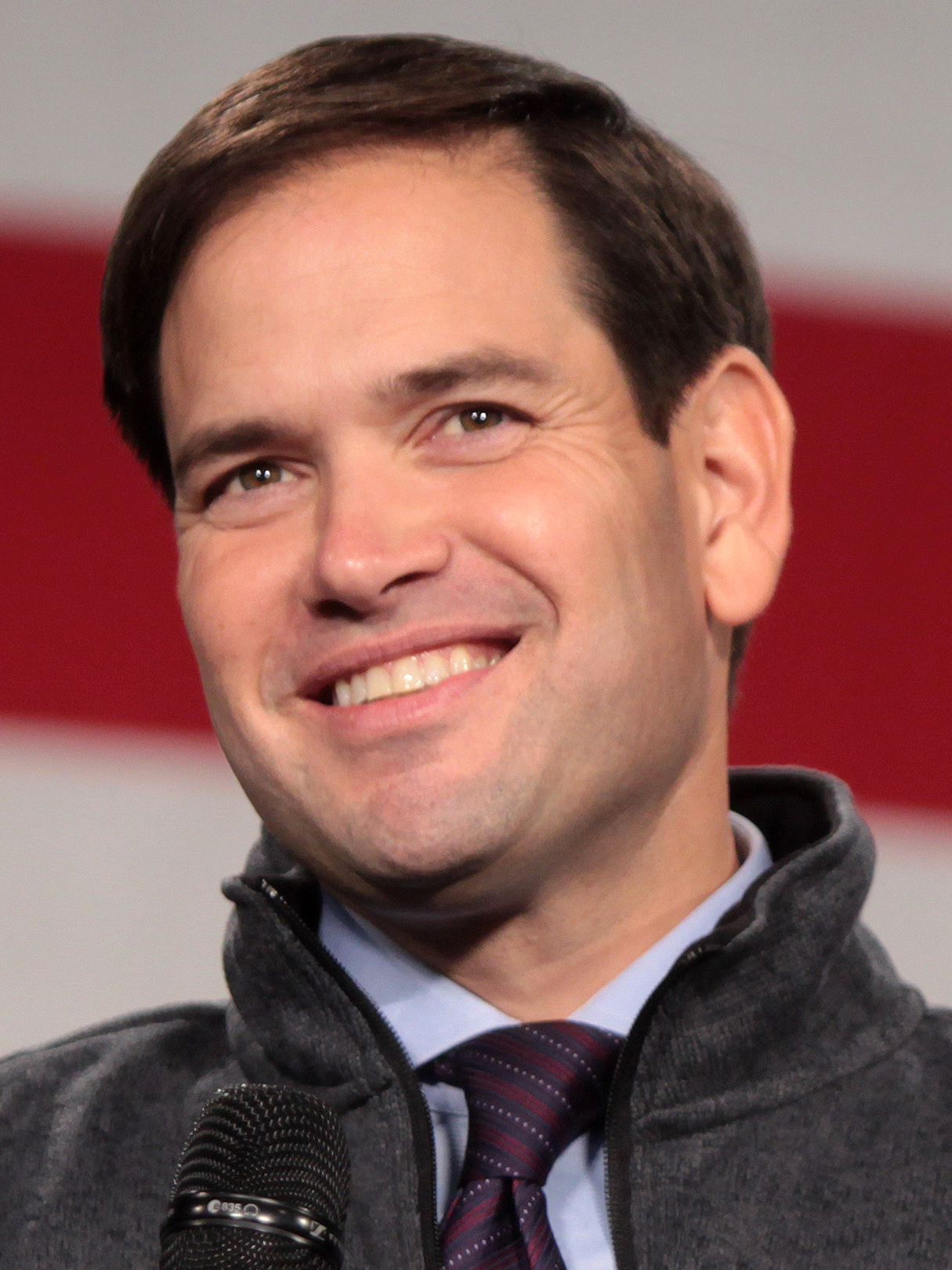

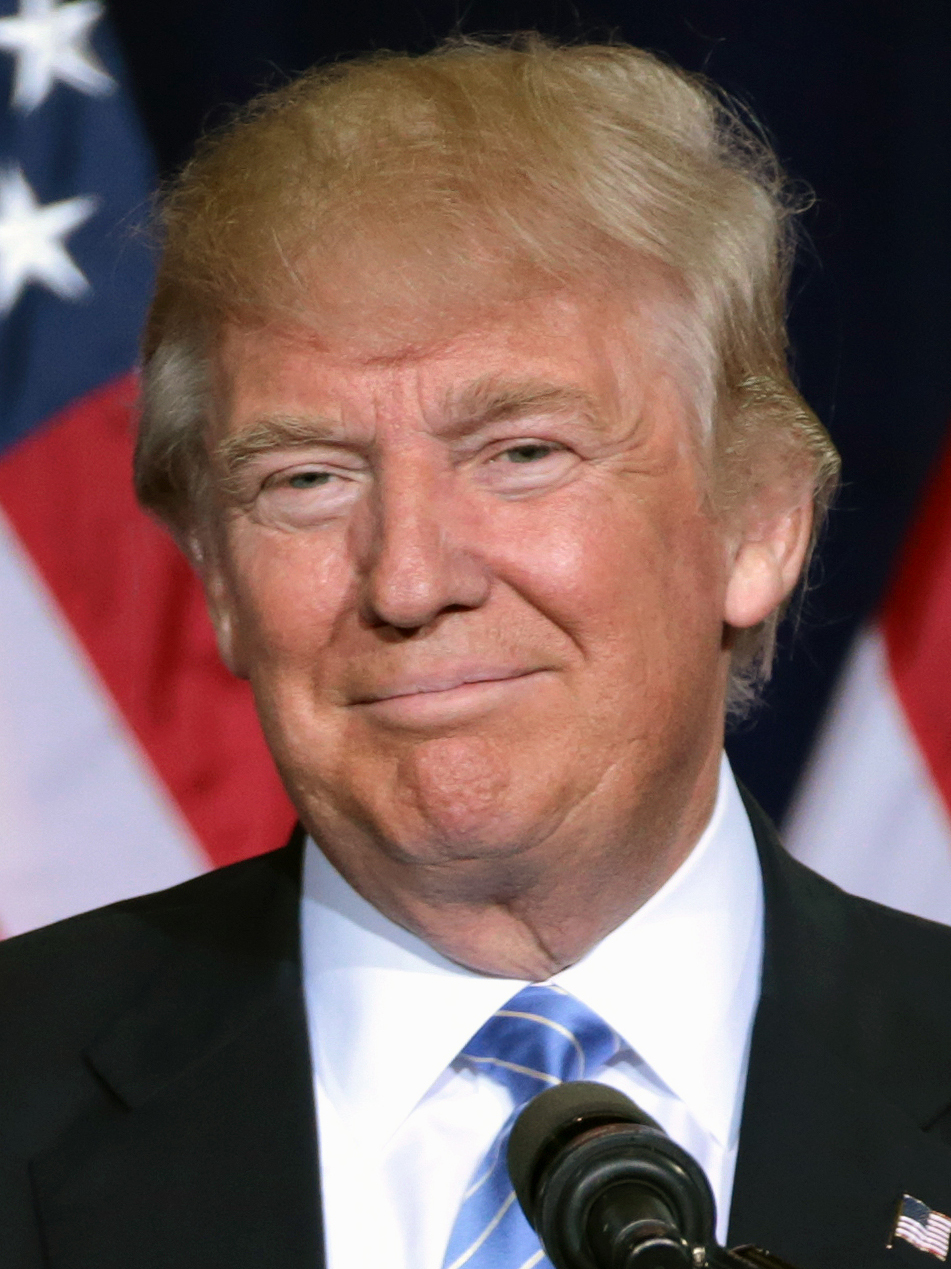
| Candidate | Ted Cruz | Marco Rubio | Donald Trump |
| Home state | Texas | Florida | New York |
| Delegate count | 24 | 1 | 1 |
| Popular vote | 1,128 | 231 | 112 |
| Percentage | 70.9% | 14.5% | 7.0% |
County results
| Ted Cruz 50–60% 60–70% >90% | Marco Rubio 50–60% | Donald Trump 50–60% | Uncommitted 50–60% |

The 2016 Wyoming Republican presidential caucuses took place from February 16 until March 1 in the U.S. state of Wyoming as one of the Republican Party's nomination contests ahead of the 2016 presidential election.

While Wyoming is the least populous U.S. states, it is at the same time one of the most Republican-leaning states, and is therefore represented by a total of 29 delegates. Twelve of these delegates, one for each of Wyoming's counties were directly awarded to the counties' winners at the county conventions on March 12. Starting as one of the first nomination contests, the last caucuses were held on March 1, this year's "Super Tuesday." The remaining 17 delegates were chosen by the State Convention held on April 14–16.

The Democratic Party was scheduled to hold their own Wyoming caucuses on April 9.

== Background ==
Wyoming is the least populous of all 50 U.S. states. With almost 60% of the population identifying with or leaning towards the Republican Party, compared to less than 30% identifying with or leaning towards the Democrats, it is also the most solid Republican state, ahead of Idaho and Utah. In the 2012 presidential election, incumbent President Barack Obama received less than 28% of the votes, trailing Mitt Romney by more than 40 points.

== Procedure ==
As these were closed caucuses, only residents that are registered as Republican Party affiliates were allowed to participate in the nomination process. Registration was possible at the county clerks' offices, and was open to 17 year old residents turning 18 by the November 8 presidential election. Except for the registration, the caucuses in all of Wyoming's 23 counties were fully administered by the Wyoming Republican Party.

Starting as one of the first nomination contests, the last caucuses were held on March 1, this year's "Super Tuesday." The county results were however only published following the March 12 county conventions, together with the results of the Washington, D.C., and Guam caucuses.

=== Delegates ===
Twelve of Wyoming's 29 delegates, were directly awarded to the county conventions' winners. All but one of Wyoming's 23 counties were grouped into pairs of two(Laramie County was alone). Ted Cruz won 9 delegates, Marco Rubio won one, Donald Trump won one, and one was elected as uncommitted. Rubio's delegates stated that she would vote for Cruz on a second ballot if there was one. Cruz won the 14 at-large state delegates available at the state convention on April 16. Apart from these, Wyoming will be represented by the National Committeeman, the National Committeewoman, and the chairman of the Wyoming Republican Party as unpledged "Superdelegates" by virtue of their position. RNC Committeewoman Marti Halverson, one of the RNC delegates, declared her support for Cruz.

== Results ==
Wyoming Republican county conventions, March 12, 2016
| Candidate | Votes | Percentage | Actual delegate count | | |
| Candidate | Votes | Percentage | Bound | Unbound | Total |
|---|---|---|---|---|---|
| Ted Cruz | 1,128 | 70.94% | 9 | 0 | 9 |
| Marco Rubio | 231 | 14.53% | 1 | 0 | 1 |
| Donald Trump | 112 | 7.04% | 1 | 0 | 1 |
| John Kasich | 42 | 2.64% | 0 | 0 | 0 |
| Others | 2 | 0.13% | 0 | 0 | 0 |
| Undeclared | 75 | 4.72% | 1 | 0 | 1 |
| Unprojected delegates: | | | 0 | 0 | 0 |
| Total: | 1,590 | 100% | 12 | 0 | 12 |
Source: The Green Papers and Wyoming Republican Party

Wyoming Republican state convention, April 14-16, 2016
| Candidate | Votes | Percentage | Actual delegate count | | |
| Candidate | Votes | Percentage | Bound | Unbound | Total |
|---|---|---|---|---|---|
| Ted Cruz | | | 14 | 1 | 15 |
| (available) | | | 0 | 2 | 2 |
| Unprojected delegates: | | | 0 | 0 | 0 |
| Total: | | | 14 | 3 | 17 |
Source: The Green Papers and Wyoming Republican Party

== Analysis ==
Ted Cruz was able to win the Wyoming caucus by a landslide margin, thanks in part to support from Mormon voters, who broke for Cruz over Trump throughout the primary. Wyoming has the third largest Mormon population in the country after neighboring Idaho and Utah.

== See also ==
- 2016 Wyoming Democratic presidential caucuses
