= 2016 Colorado Democratic presidential caucuses =

- March 1, 2016

Candidate	Bernie Sanders	Hillary Clinton
Home state	Vermont	New York
Delegate count	41	25
Popular vote	72,846	49,789
Percentage	58.98%	40.31%
Colorado results by county
Sanders
40 – 50%
50 – 60%
60 – 70%
70 – 80%
80 – 90%
Clinton
40 – 50%
50 – 60%
60 – 70%
Uncommitted
30 – 40%

The 2016 Colorado Democratic presidential caucuses took place on March 1 in the U.S. state of Colorado as one of the Democratic Party's primaries ahead of the 2016 presidential election.

On the same day, dubbed "Super Tuesday," Democratic primaries were held in ten other states plus American Samoa, while the Republican Party held primaries in eleven states including their own Colorado caucuses.

Youth and Latino caucus-goers delivered a win for Bernie Sanders.

== Opinion polling ==
Poll source	Date	1st	2nd	Other
Caucus results	March 1, 2016	Bernie Sanders; 59.44%	Hillary Clinton; 39.85%	Other; 0.71%
Washington Free Beacon/TPC Research Margin of error: ± 3% Sample size: 1144	February 16–17, 2016	Bernie Sanders; 49%	Hillary Clinton; 43%	Undecided 9%
Quinnipiac University Margin of error: ± 4.9% Sample size: 404	November 11–15, 2015	Hillary Clinton; 55%	Bernie Sanders; 27%	Martin O'Malley 2% Undecided 15%
Suffolk University Margin of error: ± ? Sample size: 159	September 13–16, 2014	Hillary Clinton; 59%	Elizabeth Warren; 21%	Joe Biden 8% Andrew Cuomo 4% Martin O’Malley 0% Undecided 6% Other 2% Refused 1%

== Results ==
=== Results of the precinct caucus ===
Caucus date: March 1, 2016

2016 Democratic Party's presidential nominating process in Colorado – Summary of results –
Candidate	Popular vote		Estimated delegates		
Candidate	Count	Percentage	Pledged	Unpledged	Total
Bernie Sanders	72,846	58.98%	41	0	41
Hillary Clinton	49,789	40.31%	25	9	34
Uncommitted	822	0.67%	0	3	3
Others	51	0.04%			
Total	123,508	100%	66	12	78

=== Detailed estimates per congressional district ===
Detailed results for the Colorado Democratic caucuses, March 1, 2016
District	Total estimate		Bernie Sanders		Hillary Clinton	
District	Votes	Estimated delegates	Votes	Estimated delegates	Votes	Estimated delegates
1st district	29,474	8	16,232	4	13,242	4
2nd district	30,624	7	19,376	4	11,248	3
3rd district	14,671	6	8,956	4	5,715	2
4th district	10,060	5	6,115	3	3,945	2
5th district	10,315	5	6,338	3	3,977	2
6th district	12,836	6	6,675	3	6,161	3
7th district	14,655	6	9,154	4	5,501	4
At-large delegates	122,635	14	72,846	8	49,789	6
Pledged PLEOs	122,635	9	72,846	5	49,789	4
Total		66		38		28

=== Results of the county assemblies ===
Timeframe for the county assemblies: March 2–26, 2016

Colorado Democratic county assemblies, March 2–26, 2016
Candidate	State + District delegates		Estimated delegates		
Candidate	Count	Percentage	Pledged	Unpledged	Total
Bernie Sanders	372	61.39%			
Hillary Clinton	234	38.61%			
Uncommitted					
Total	606	100%			

=== Results of the congressional district conventions ===
Detailed results for the congressional district conventions, April 1–15, 2016

District	Delegates available	Delegates won	
District	Delegates available	Sanders	Clinton
1st district	8	5	3
2nd district	7	4	3
3rd district	6	4	2
4th district	5	3	2
5th district	5	3	2
6th district	6	3	3
7th district	6	4	2
Total	43	26	17

=== Results of the state convention ===
State convention date: April 16, 2016

Colorado Democratic State Convention, April 16, 2016
Candidate	State convention delegates		National delegates won		
Candidate	Count	Percentage	At-large	PLEO	Total
Bernie Sanders	1,900	62.3%	9	6	15
Hillary Clinton	1,150	37.7%	5	3	8
Total	3,050	100.0%	14	9	23

== Analysis ==
As Barack Obama had similarly done eight years earlier in the state, Bernie Sanders won a convincing 19-point victory in the Colorado caucus, relying on turnout from young adult voters in a majority white electorate. He ran up big margins in the capital city of Denver and in Denver County at large, as well as in Colorado Springs in El Paso County and Fort Collins in Larimer County. Sanders also performed very strongly in the western parts of the state along the Rocky Mountains, in regions such as the Colorado Mineral belt and Northwestern Colorado which are rural and sparsely populated. Clinton won in the city of Pueblo in Pueblo County.

Sanders gained more delegates over Clinton with a large turnout from supporters at the conventions in April.
