= 2008 Wyoming Republican presidential caucuses =

- January 8, 2008
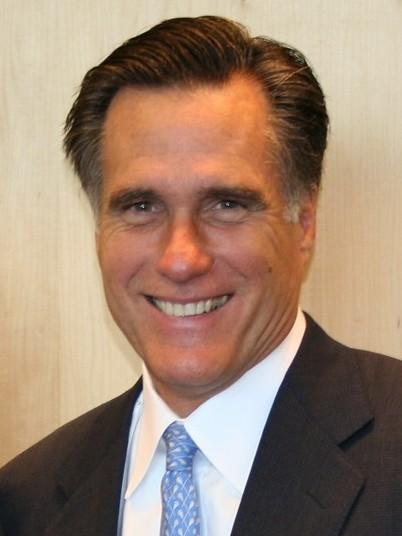

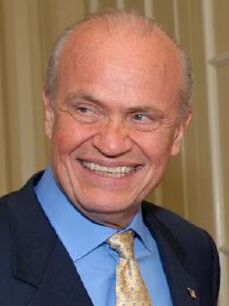

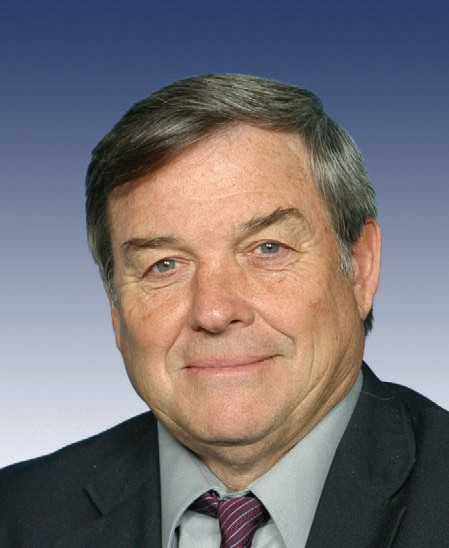

Candidate	Mitt Romney	Fred Thompson
Home state	Massachusetts	Tennessee
Delegate count	8	3
Percentage	54.2%	16.7%
Candidate	Duncan Hunter	John McCain
Home state	California	Arizona
Delegate count	1	0
Percentage	8.3%	4.2%
- Election results by county. Mitt Romney Fred Thompson Duncan Hunter John McCain Uncommitted

The 2008 Wyoming Republican presidential caucuses took place on January 5, 2008, with 12 national delegates chosen by county convention delegates. A majority of the national delegates were won by former Massachusetts Governor Mitt Romney. In addition, two national delegates were elected at the Republican State Convention on May 30–31.

Eligible voters included precinct committee chairs (one man and one woman for each of the 487 precincts, which were elected in 2006) and 250 county convention delegates, elected in precinct caucuses held throughout Wyoming in December 2007 and apportioned according to Republican voters in the last congressional election.

Although originally the size of the delegation was 28, RNC rules stated that any states holding primary contests before February 5 would lose half of their delegates.

== Results ==
Each of the 23 counties elected either a delegate or an alternate delegate, except for Laramie County, which elected both a delegate and an alternate delegate.

Results by Candidate
Candidate	Delegates	Alternates	Percentage
Mitt Romney	8	5	54.17%
Fred Thompson	3	1	16.67%
Duncan Hunter	1	1	8.33%
John McCain	0	1	4.17%
Mike Huckabee	0	0	0%
Ron Paul	0	0	0%
Rudy Giuliani	0	0	0%
Uncommitted	0	4	16.67%
Total	12	12	100%

=== Results by County ===
Results by County
County	Delegate/Alternate	Candidate
Albany	Delegate	Mitt Romney
Big Horn	Alternate	Mitt Romney
Campbell	Delegate	Mitt Romney
Carbon	Alternate	Mitt Romney
Converse	Delegate	Mitt Romney
Crook	Delegate	Fred Thompson
Fremont	Delegate	Mitt Romney
Goshen	Delegate	Fred Thompson
Hot Springs	Delegate	Fred Thompson
Johnson	Alternate	Uncommitted
Laramie	Alternate	Mitt Romney
Laramie	Delegate	Mitt Romney
Lincoln	Alternate	Mitt Romney
Natrona	Alternate	Uncommitted
Niobrara	Alternate	Fred Thompson
Park	Alternate	Mitt Romney
Platte	Alternate	Duncan Hunter
Sheridan	Delegate	Duncan Hunter
Sublette	Alternate	John McCain
Sweetwater	Delegate	Mitt Romney
Teton	Delegate	Mitt Romney
Uinta	Delegate	Mitt Romney
Washakie	Alternate	Uncommitted
Weston	Alternate	Uncommitted

The Wyoming Republican Party did not release the vote totals.

== See also ==
- 2008 Republican Party presidential primaries
- 2008 Wyoming Democratic presidential caucuses
