= 2008 Wyoming Democratic presidential caucuses =

- March 8 – May 24, 2008

18 Democratic National Convention delegates (12 pledged, 6 unpledged)

Candidate	Barack Obama	Hillary Clinton
Home state	Illinois	New York
Delegate count	7	5
Popular vote	5,378	3,311
Percentage	61.44%	37.83%
- Primary results by county Obama: 40–50% 50–60% 60–70% Clinton: 50–60% Tie

The 2008 Wyoming Democratic presidential caucuses were a series of events designed to determine the delegates that the Wyoming Democratic Party sent to the 2008 Democratic National Convention. The party was allocated seven pledged delegates to presidential candidates on March 8 during the Wyoming Democratic County Caucuses. The remaining five pledged delegates were allocated on May 24 during the Wyoming Democratic State Convention. There were six Wyoming superdelegates, so the whole delegation was composed of 18 delegates.

== Process ==
The Wyoming caucus were open to all eligible voters who were registered as Democrats by February 22, 2008. A 15 percent threshold was required in order to receive delegates at any caucus site. Rather than the traditional caucus format, most sites used secret ballots which were then counted and delegates apportioned, without re-caucusing of nonviable groups.

== Results ==
=== County caucuses ===
Caucus date: March 8, 2008

National pledged delegates determined: 12

2008 Wyoming Democratic presidential county caucuses
Candidate	Votes	Percentage	District Delegates	Estimated national delegates
Barack Obama	5,378	61.44%	4	7
Hillary Clinton	3,311	37.83%	3	5
Other	64	0.73%	0	0
Totals	8,753	100.00%	7	12

=== State Convention ===
Convention date: May 24, 2008

National pledged delegates determined: 5

Wyoming Democratic presidential state convention, 2008
Candidate	At-Large and PLEO delegates	Percentage	National delegates
Barack Obama	-	0.00%	7
Hillary Clinton	-	0.00%	5
Totals	5	0.00%	12

== See also ==
- 2008 Democratic Party presidential primaries
- 2008 Wyoming Republican presidential caucuses
