= 2016 Ohio Republican presidential primary =

- March 15, 2016
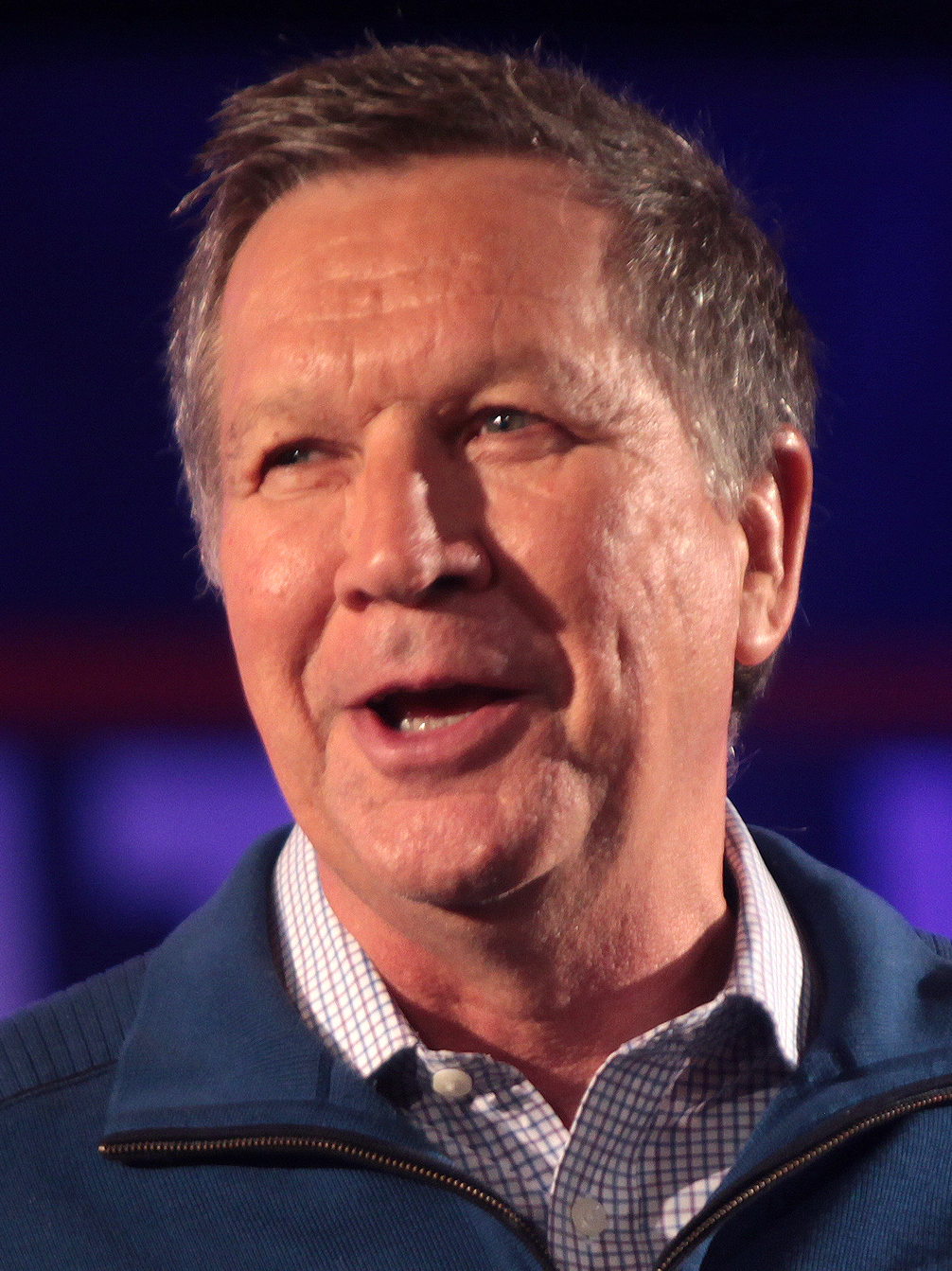

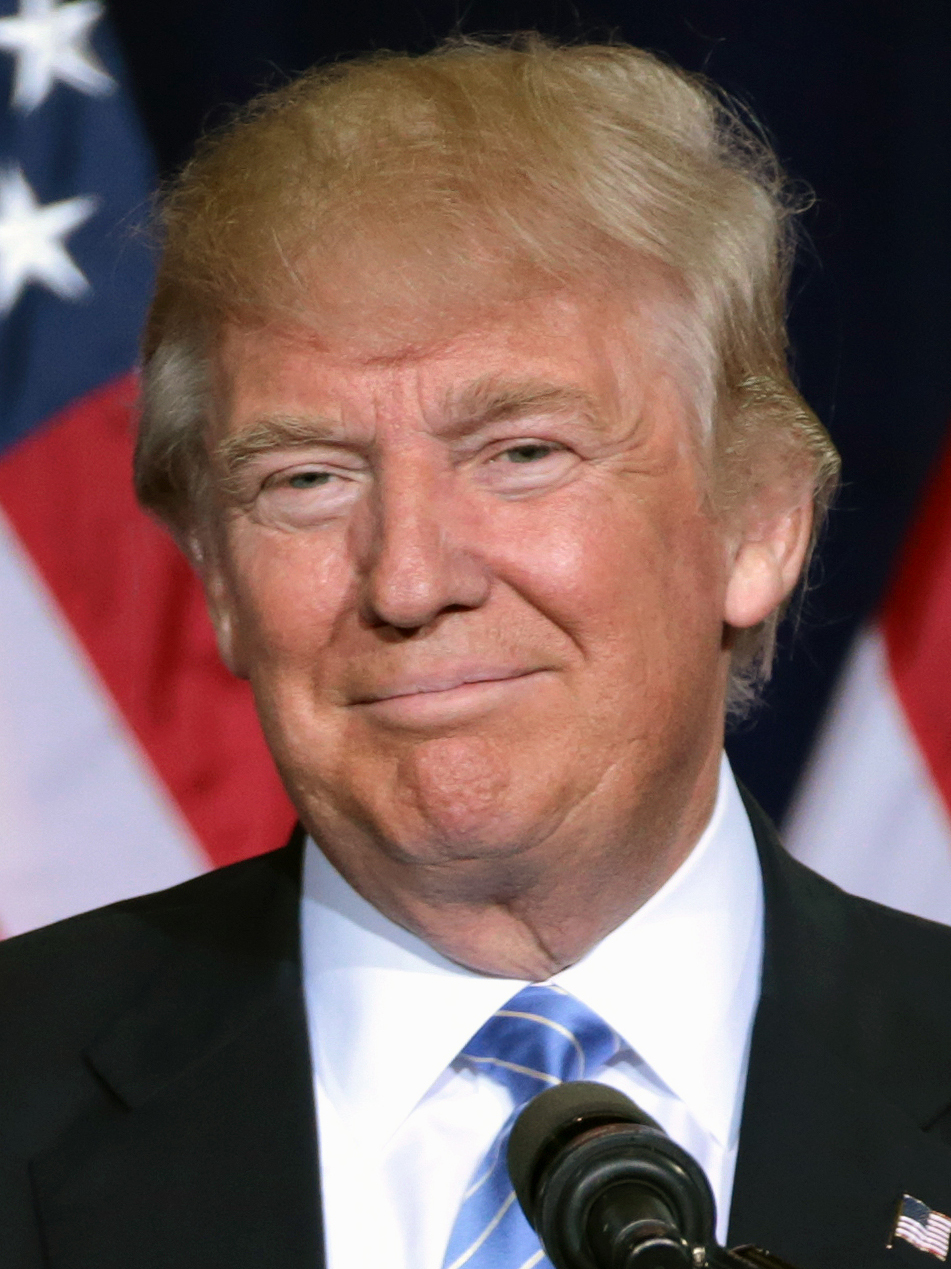

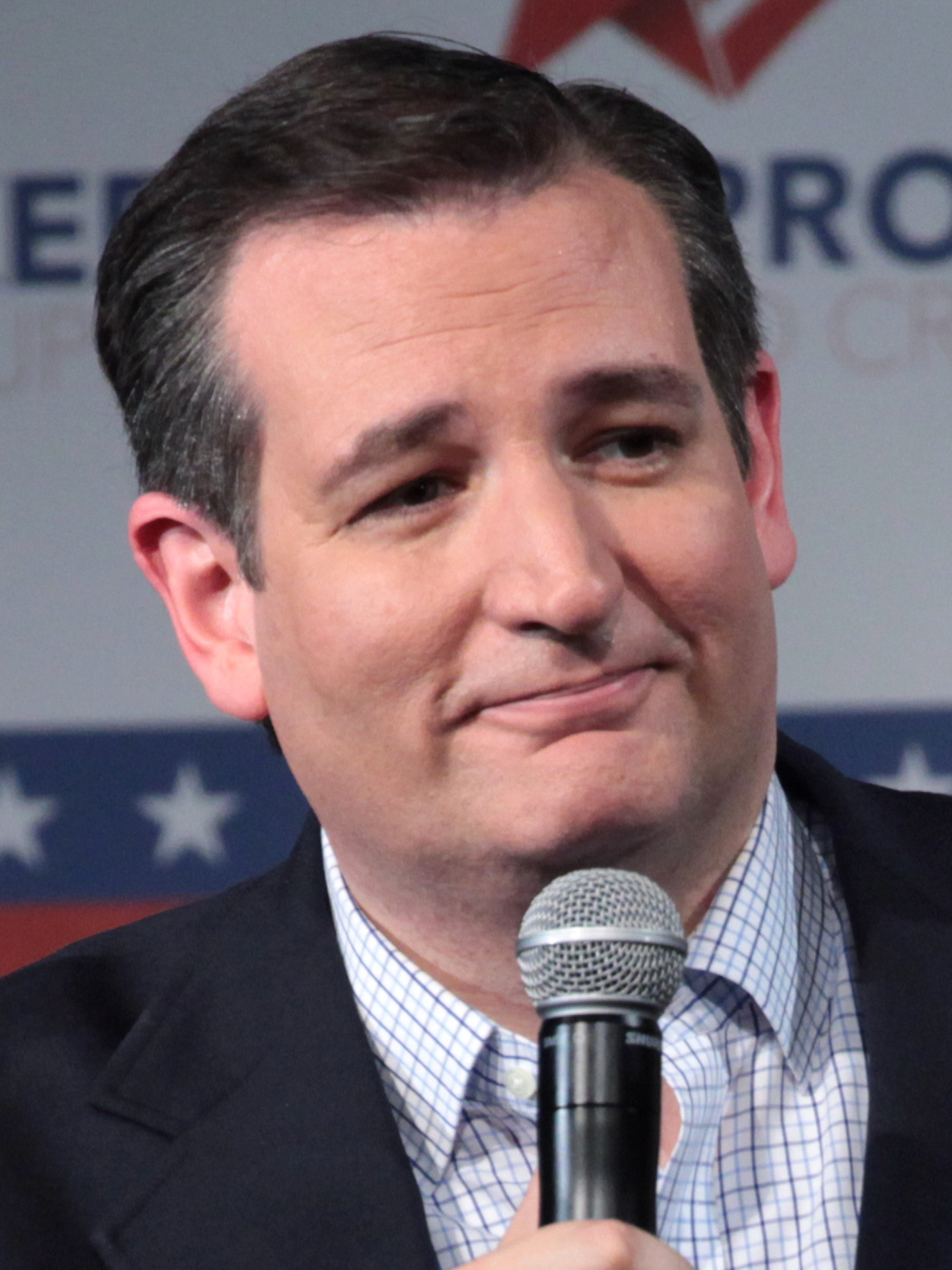
Candidate	John Kasich	Donald Trump	Ted Cruz
Home state	Ohio	New York	Texas
Delegate count	66	0	0
Popular vote	933,886	713,404	264,640
Percentage	46.95%	35.87%	13.31%
Ohio results by county.
John Kasich
30-40%
40–50%
50–60%
60–70%
Donald Trump
30–40%
40–50%
50–60%

The 2016 Ohio Republican presidential primary took place March 15 in the U.S. state of Ohio, as a part of the Republican Party's series of presidential primaries ahead of the 2016 presidential election. The Ohio primary was held alongside Republican primary elections in Florida, Illinois, Missouri and North Carolina, along with the Democratic contest in Ohio.

The primary was won by the state's then governor, John Kasich.

== Background ==
In the 2012 Republican primary elections, the Ohio primary was a winner-take-most primary scheduled for March 6. However, the state's winner, Mitt Romney, reached only 37% of the vote and thus won only 58% of the state's delegates. House Bill 153, signed by Governor Kasich, moved the primary to March 15 for the 2016 contest, in what would be dubbed a second Super Tuesday by several news networks. In addition, in mid-September, Ohio's Republican Party decided to make the state's 66 delegates completely winner-take-all, in order to maximize the state's power on the nominating convention and to avoid a similar problem to what happened in 2012. This was also expected to help John Kasich, as the state's governor.

== The state of the campaign ==
=== Previous contests ===
Despite an early victory by Ted Cruz in the Iowa caucuses, Donald Trump was seen as making steady progress towards the Republican nomination at the time. Trump was victorious in 7 of the contests on March 1, with Cruz seen as the only viable threat to Trump after victories in his home state of Texas and 3 other March 1 contests. Marco Rubio performed worse than anticipated on March 1, taking only Minnesota. On March 8, two primaries and a caucus were held in Hawaii, Michigan and Mississippi. Despite a poll from American Research Group that showed Kasich leading Trump in Michigan, Trump won all three contests.

=== Run-up to the election ===
Poll source	Date	1st	2nd	3rd	Other
Primary results	March 15, 2016	John Kasich; 46.95%	Donald Trump; 35.87%	Ted Cruz; 13.31%	Marco Rubio 2.34%, Ben Carson 0.72%, Jeb Bush 0.27%, Mike Huckabee 0.25%, Chris Christie 0.12%, Carly Fiorina 0.11%, Rick Santorum 0.07%
ARG Margin of error: ± 5% Sample size: 400	March 12–13, 2016	John Kasich; 44%	Donald Trump; 38%	Ted Cruz; 12%	Marco Rubio 2%, Undecided 4%
Monmouth University Margin of error: ± 4.4% Sample size: 503	March 11–13, 2016	John Kasich; 40%	Donald Trump; 35%	Ted Cruz; 15%	Marco Rubio 5%, Other 1%, Undecided 4%
Quinnipiac University Margin of error: ± 3.7% Sample size: 721	March 8–13, 2016	Donald Trump; 38%	John Kasich; 38%	Ted Cruz; 16%	Marco Rubio 3%, Undecided 4%
CBS News/YouGov Margin of error: ± 4.4% Sample size: 798	March 9–11, 2016	John Kasich; 33%	Donald Trump; 33%	Ted Cruz; 27%	Marco Rubio 5%, No Preference 2%
NBC News/WSJ/Marist Margin of error: ± 4.1% Sample size: 564	March 4–10, 2016	John Kasich; 39%	Donald Trump; 33%	Ted Cruz; 19%	Marco Rubio 6%
Fox News Margin of error: ± 3.5% Sample size: 806	March 5–8, 2016	John Kasich; 34%	Donald Trump; 29%	Ted Cruz; 19%	Marco Rubio 7%, Undecided 5%, Other 3%, None of the above 2%
Quinnipiac University Margin of error: ± 3.7% Sample size: 685	March 2–7, 2016	Donald Trump; 38%	John Kasich; 32%	Ted Cruz; 16%	Marco Rubio 9%, Undecided 5%
Public Policy Polling Margin of error: ± 3.9% Sample size: 638	March 4–6, 2016	Donald Trump; 38%	John Kasich; 35%	Ted Cruz; 15%	Marco Rubio 5%, Undecided 5%
CNN/ORC Margin of error: ± 5% Sample size: 359	March 2–6, 2016	Donald Trump; 41%	John Kasich; 35%	Ted Cruz; 15%	Marco Rubio 7%
Quinnipiac University Margin of error: ± 3.6% Sample size: 759	February 16–20, 2016	Donald Trump; 31%	John Kasich; 26%	Ted Cruz; 21%	Marco Rubio 13%, Ben Carson 5%, Someone else 0%, DK/NA 5%
Baldwin Wallace University Margin of error: ± 5% Sample size: 440	February 11–20, 2016	Donald Trump; 31%	John Kasich; 29%	Ted Cruz; 11%	Marco Rubio 10%, Ben Carson 8%, Jeb Bush 3%, Don't Know 8%
Quinnipiac University Margin of error: ± 4.7% Sample size: 433	September 25 – October 5, 2015	Donald Trump; 23%	Ben Carson; 18%	John Kasich; 13%	Ted Cruz 11%, Carly Fiorina 10%, Marco Rubio 7%, Jeb Bush 4%, Rand Paul 3%, Mike Huckabee 2%, Chris Christie 1%, Jim Gilmore 0%, George Pataki 0%, Bobby Jindal 0%, Rick Santorum 0%, Lindsey Graham 0%, Someone else 0%, Would not vote 2%, DK/NA 6%
Quinnipiac University Margin of error: ± 5.1% Sample size: 371	August 7–18, 2015	John Kasich; 27%	Donald Trump; 21%	Ted Cruz; 7%	Marco Rubio 7%, Ben Carson 6%, Carly Fiorina 5%, Jeb Bush 5%, Mike Huckabee 3%, Scott Walker 2%, Rick Santorum 2%, Rand Paul 2%, Chris Christie 1%, Bobby Jindal 0%, Rick Perry 0%, Lindsey Graham 0%, Don't know 11%
Quinnipiac University Margin of error: ± 4.8% Sample size: 413	June 4–15, 2015	John Kasich; 19%	Jeb Bush; 9%	Scott Walker; 8%	Marco Rubio 7%, Rand Paul 7%, Mike Huckabee 7%, Ben Carson 6%, Ted Cruz 6%, Chris Christie 3%, Lindsey Graham 2%, Rick Perry 2%, Rick Santorum 2%, Carly Fiorina 1%, Donald Trump 1%, Bobby Jindal 0%, Someone else 1%, Wouldn't vote 1%, Don't know 17%
Public Policy Polling Margin of error: ± 4.8% Sample size: 411	June 4–7, 2015	John Kasich; 19%	Ben Carson; 13%	Scott Walker; 13%	Jeb Bush 12%, Marco Rubio 12%, Rand Paul 9%, Mike Huckabee 6%, Ted Cruz 5%, Chris Christie 4%, Someone Else/Not Sure 8%
Quinnipiac University Margin of error: ± 4.9% Sample size: 404	March 17–28, 2015	John Kasich; 20%	Ted Cruz; 9%	Mike Huckbee; 9%	Scott Walker 9%, Jeb Bush 8%, Ben Carson 8%, Rand Paul 7%, Chris Christie 5%, Marco Rubio 5%, Bobby Jindal 1%, Rick Perry 1%, Rick Santorum 1%, Lindsey Graham 0%, Someone else 1%, Wouldn't vote 1% Undecided 15%
Quinnipiac University Margin of error: ± 4.9% Sample size: 404	March 17–28, 2015	John Kasich; 22%	Scott Walker; 10%	Ted Cruz; 9%	Mike Huckabee 9%, Ben Carson 8%, Rand Paul 7%, Chris Christie 6%, Marco Rubio 6%, Rick Perry 2%, Bobby Jindal 1%, Rick Santorum 1%, Lindsey Graham 0%, Someone else 1%, Wouldn't vote 1% Undecided 17%
Quinnipiac University Margin of error: ± 4.9% Sample size: 404	March 17–28, 2015	John Kasich; 22%	Ted Cruz; 11%	Jeb Bush; 9%	Ben Carson 9%, Mike Huckabee 9%, Rand Paul 7%, Marco Rubio 6%, Chris Christie 5%, Bobby Jindal 2%, Rick Perry 1%, Rick Santorum 1%, Lindsey Graham 0%, Someone else 1%, Wouldn't vote 1% Undecided 15%
Quinnipiac University Margin of error: ± 5.3% Sample size: 337	January 22 – February 1, 2015	Mitt Romney; 15%	John Kasich; 11%	Scott Walker; 10%	Jeb Bush 9%, Rand Paul 8%, Ben Carson 7%, Ted Cruz 5%, Mike Huckabee 5%, Chris Christie 4%, Marco Rubio 3%, Bobby Jindal 1%, Rick Perry 0%, Rick Santorum 0%, Other 2%, Wouldn't vote 2%, Undecided 18%
Quinnipiac University Margin of error: ± 5.3% Sample size: 337	January 22 – February 1, 2015	John Kasich; 14%	Scott Walker; 11%	Jeb Bush; 10%	Rand Paul 10%, Ben Carson 8%, Mike Huckabee 7%, Ted Cruz 6%, Chris Christie 6%, Marco Rubio 4%, Bobby Jindal 1%, Rick Perry 1%, Rick Santorum 1%, Other 2%, Wouldn't vote 2%, Undecided 20%
Magellan Strategies Margin of error: ± 6% Sample size: 300	April 14–15, 2014	Mike Huckabee; 17%	Rand Paul; 15%	Jeb Bush; 13%	Chris Christie 13%, Ted Cruz 12%, John Kasich 10%, Marco Rubio 5%, Scott Walker 4%, Undecided 11%
Public Policy Polling Margin of error: ± 5.2% Sample size: 357	Aug. 16–19, 2013	Chris Christie; 17%	Rand Paul; 17%	Jeb Bush; 10%	Marco Rubio 9%, John Kasich 8%, Paul Ryan 8%, Ted Cruz 6%, Bobby Jindal 4%, Rick Santorum 4%, Someone Else/Undecided 17%

The opinion polls during early March showed a narrow lead for Trump over Governor Kasich. These polls found approximately 10% support for Marco Rubio, in a distant fourth place. Seeing that many Rubio voters also preferred Governor Kasich as "establishment" voters, Rubio's communications director encouraged Rubio voters to vote for Kasich on March 11. The strategy seemed to work, as Kasich drew narrowly ahead in the polls immediately before the election. Kasich was seen as a slight favorite to take the state immediately before the primary.

== Results ==
Ohio Republican primary, March 15, 2016
Candidate	Votes	Percentage	Actual delegate count		
Candidate	Votes	Percentage	Bound	Unbound	Total
John Kasich	933,886	46.95%	66	0	66
Donald Trump	713,404	35.87%	0	0	0
Ted Cruz	264,640	13.31%	0	0	0
Marco Rubio	46,478	2.34%	0	0	0
Ben Carson (withdrawn)	14,351	0.72%	0	0	0
Jeb Bush (withdrawn)	5,398	0.27%	0	0	0
Mike Huckabee (withdrawn)	4,941	0.25%	0	0	0
Chris Christie (withdrawn)	2,430	0.12%	0	0	0
Carly Fiorina (withdrawn)	2,112	0.11%	0	0	0
Rick Santorum (withdrawn)	1,320	0.07%	0	0	0
Unprojected delegates:			0	0	0
Total:	1,988,960	100.00%	66	0	66
Source: The Green Papers

Marco Rubio suspended his campaign after March 15's contests, although this was more based on a poor Florida primary as opposed to the Ohio contest.
