= 2016 New York Democratic presidential primary =

- April 19, 2016

Candidate	Hillary Clinton	Bernie Sanders
Home state	New York	Vermont
Delegate count	139	108
Popular vote	1,133,980	820,256
Percentage	57.54%	41.62%
- County results Clinton: 50-60% 60-70% 70-80% Sanders: 50-60% 60-70% 70-80%

New York City results by precinct Sanders: 40–50%; 50–60%; 60–70%; 70–80%; 80–90%; 90–100%; Clinton: 40–50%; 50–60%; 60–70%; 70–80%; 80–90%; 90–100%; Other: 40–50% tie; 50% tie; No votes

The 2016 New York Democratic presidential primary was held on April 19 in the U.S. state of New York as one of the Democratic Party's primaries ahead of the 2016 presidential election. Hillary Clinton, who had previously represented New York in the United States Senate from 2001 to 2009, won a comfortable majority in both the popular vote and delegate count over Bernie Sanders, who was born in Brooklyn.

The Republican Party also held their own New York primary on the same day. Apart from that, no other primaries were scheduled for that day by either party.

== Campaign ==
The week before the primary, Sanders drew large crowds to campaign events in New York City: 28,000 heard Sanders speak in Brooklyn the weekend before the primary and 27,000 heard him speak in Manhattan the week before. Clinton drew "appreciative crowds of respectable size" but did not approach the attendance of Sanders events.

In early April, ahead of the primary, former President Bill Clinton visited western New York twice for campaign events, speaking at an event in Depew (attended by almost a thousand people) and addressing a room of activists and volunteers at Clinton's Buffalo campaign office.

In total, the Sanders campaign spent about $2 million more than the Clinton campaign on television ads in New York. In terms of campaign-expenditures per vote, Sanders' campaign spent about $9.03 per vote, while Clinton's campaign spent about $3.62 per vote.

=== April 2016 presidential debate ===
A ninth debate was held on April 14, 2016, in Brooklyn, New York at the Duggal Greenhouse in Brooklyn Navy Yard. The debate was aired on CNN and NY1. Wolf Blitzer of CNN served as moderator.

== Election Day irregularities ==
The New York Times reported the day after the primary:

The Democratic vote was marred by major irregularities at polling places across Brooklyn. The city comptroller's office announced that the Board of Elections had confirmed that more than 200,000 Democratic voters in Brooklyn were dropped between November and this month, while about 63,000 were added – a net loss that was not explained. Mayor Bill de Blasio described 'the purging of entire buildings and blocks of voters,' while the comptroller, Scott Stringer, said his office would audit the Board of Elections.

The Brooklyn voter purge disproportionately affected Hispanic voters, and mostly voters between the ages of 30 and 80, and happened at similar rates in election districts where Clinton won and where Sanders won. Although 121,056 people voted with provisional ballots in New York City, the board threw out nearly 91,000 "either because their names were taken off the rolls or because their party affiliation had been dropped or switched to a different party without their knowing."

In November 2016, several groups sued the New York City Board of Elections over the voter roll purge. Initial parties to the lawsuit included "Lawyers Committee for Civil Rights Under the Law, Latino Justice/PRLDEF and Dechert LLP on behalf of Common Cause New York and several individual plaintiffs. In early 2017, both the Justice Department and New York State Attorney General's office made motions to join the lawsuit." In October 2017 WNYC reported that, pending court approval to the consent decree, that the New York State Board of Elections agreed to a settlement with parties to the lawsuit against them, admitting to illegally purging over 200,000 eligible voters from New York City voter rolls.

As a part of the settlement, the Board agreed to a series of remedial measures that will be in place at least through the next presidential election, November 2020 – pending court approval. The deal restores the rights of improperly purged voters and establishes a comprehensive plan to prevent illegal voter purges in future elections.

== Opinion polling ==
List of polls

Poll source	Date	1st	2nd	Other
Primary results	April 19, 2016	Hillary Clinton; 57.5%	Bernie Sanders; 41.6%	Void / Blank Votes; 0.9%
Emerson College Margin of error: ± 4.6% Sample size: 438	April 15–17, 2016	Hillary Clinton; 55%	Bernie Sanders; 40%	Others / Undecided; 5%
CBS News/YouGov Margin of error: ± 4.4% Sample size: 1,033	April 13–15, 2016	Hillary Clinton; 53%	Bernie Sanders; 43%	Others / Undecided; 4%
NBC/WSJ/Marist Margin of error: ± 4.0% Sample size: 591	April 10–13, 2016	Hillary Clinton; 57%	Bernie Sanders; 40%	Others / Undecided; 3%
Quinnipiac Margin of error: ± 3.3% Sample size: 860	April 6–11, 2016	Hillary Clinton; 53%	Bernie Sanders; 40%	Others / Undecided; 7%
Gravis Marketing/ One America News Margin of error: ± 2.9% Sample size: 1,134	April 5–6, 2016	Hillary Clinton; 53%	Bernie Sanders; 47%	
Siena College Margin of error: ± 4.5% Sample size: 538	April 6–11, 2016	Hillary Clinton; 52%	Bernie Sanders; 42%	Others / Undecided; 6%
Monmouth Margin of error: ± 5.6% Sample size: 302	April 8–10, 2016	Hillary Clinton; 51%	Bernie Sanders; 39%	Others / Undecided; 10%
PPP Margin of error: ± 3.8% Sample size: 663	April 7–10, 2016	Hillary Clinton; 51%	Bernie Sanders; 40%	Others / Undecided; 9%
NBC News/WSJ/Marist Margin of error: ± 4.2% Sample size: 557	April 6–10, 2016	Hillary Clinton; 55%	Bernie Sanders; 41%	Others / Undecided; 4%
NY1/Baruch Margin of error: ± 4.2% Sample size: 632	April 5–10, 2016	Hillary Clinton; 50%	Bernie Sanders; 37%	Others / Undecided; 13%
Emerson College Margin of error: ± 5.4% Sample size: 324	April 6–7, 2016	Hillary Clinton; 56%	Bernie Sanders; 38%	Others / Undecided; 6%
FOX News Margin of error: ± 3.5% Sample size: 801	April 4–7, 2016	Hillary Clinton; 53%	Bernie Sanders; 37%	Others / Undecided; 10%
CBS News/YouGov Margin of error: ± 3.4% Sample size: 718	March 29- April 1, 2016	Hillary Clinton; 53%	Bernie Sanders; 43%	Others / Undecided; 4%
Quinnipiac Margin of error: ± 3.7% Sample size: 693	March 22–29, 2016	Hillary Clinton; 54%	Bernie Sanders; 42%	Others / Undecided; 4%
Emerson College Margin of error: ± 5.0% Sample size: 373	March 14–16, 2016	Hillary Clinton; 71%	Bernie Sanders; 23%	Others / Undecided; 6%
Siena College Margin of error: ± 6.2% Sample size: 368	February 28–March 3, 2016	Hillary Clinton; 55%	Bernie Sanders; 34%	Others / Undecided; 11%
Siena College Margin of error: ± 5.6% Sample size: 434	January 31 – February 3, 2016	Hillary Clinton; 55%	Bernie Sanders; 34%	Others / Undecided; 11%

Polls in 2015

Poll source	Date	1st	2nd	3rd	Other
Siena College Margin of error: ± 5% Sample size: 374	September 14–17, 2015	Hillary Clinton; 45%	Joe Biden; 24%	Bernie Sanders; 23%	None of them 4%, Don't know/No opinion 3%
Quinnipiac University Margin of error: ± 4.4% Sample size: 508	May 28 – June 1, 2015	Hillary Clinton; 55%	Bernie Sanders; 15%	Joe Biden; 9%	Martin O'Malley 2%, Jim Webb 2%, Lincoln Chafee 1%, Someone else 2%, Wouldn't vote 2%, Undecided 13%
Siena College Margin of error: ± 6.3% Sample size: ?	April 19–23, 2015	Hillary Clinton; 69%			Someone else 22%
Quinnipiac University Margin of error: ± 4.3% Sample size: 521	March 11–16, 2015	Hillary Clinton; 51%	Elizabeth Warren; 11%	Joe Biden; 8%	Andrew Cuomo 7%, Bernie Sanders 5%, Martin O'Malley 1%, Jim Webb 1%, Other 0%, Wouldn't vote 3%, Undecided 12%

Polls in 2013

Poll source	Date	1st	2nd	3rd	Other
Marist College Margin of error: ± 5.7% Sample size: 294	November 18–20, 2013	Hillary Clinton; 64%	Andrew Cuomo; 14%	Joe Biden; 8%	Elizabeth Warren 6%, Martin O'Malley 3%, Undecided 5%

== Results ==
New York Democratic primary, April 19, 2016
Candidate	Popular vote		Estimated delegates		
Candidate	Count	Percentage	Pledged	Unpledged	Total
Hillary Clinton	1,133,980	57.54%	139	41	180
Bernie Sanders	820,056	41.62%	108	0	108
Void	11,306	0.57%			
Blank votes	5,358	0.27%			
Uncommitted	—N/a		0	3	3
Total	1,970,900	100%	247	44	291

=== Results by county ===
County	Clinton	%	Sanders	%	BVS	Totals	Turnout	Margin
Albany	19,914	47.74%	21,798	52.26%	354	42,066	47.47%	-4.48%
Allegany	847	40.62%	1,209	57.99%	29	2,085	35.53%	-17.36%
Bronx	105,719	68.76%	46,189	30.04%	1,834	153,742	31.31%	38.72%
Broome	7,641	43.11%	9,951	56.15%	131	17,723	43.40%	-13.03%
Cattaraugus	1,844	42.28%	2,481	56.89%	36	4,361	29.93%	-14.61%
Cayuga	2,592	47.65%	2,805	51.56%	43	5,440	36.89%	-3.92%
Chautauqua	3,865	46.09%	4,431	52.84%	90	8,386	32.68%	-6.75%
Chemung	2,740	49.43%	2,752	49.65%	51	5,543	35.91%	-0.22%
Chenango	1,062	39.23%	1,613	59.59%	32	2,707	37.60%	-20.35%
Clinton	1,774	26.76%	4,797	72.35%	59	6,630	39.37%	-45.60%
Columbia	3,039	45.14%	3,660	54.37%	33	6,732	51.64%	-9.22%
Cortland	1,515	41.90%	2,037	56.33%	64	3,616	42.80%	-14.44%
Delaware	1,172	38.96%	1,813	60.27%	23	3,008	41.70%	-21.31%
Dutchess	11,701	48.37%	12,395	51.23%	97	24,193	41.70%	-2.87%
Erie	54,279	50.40%	52,473	48.72%	955	107,707	38.91%	1.68%
Essex	838	27.90%	2,145	71.40%	21	3,004	47.40%	-43.51%
Franklin	1,076	29.74%	2,512	69.43%	30	3,618	37.59%	-39.69%
Fulton	1,010	40.16%	1,475	58.65%	30	2,515	32.80%	-18.49%
Genesee	1,393	45.66%	1,622	53.16%	36	3,051	33.66%	-7.51%
Greene	1,195	42.82%	1,566	56.11%	30	2,791	40.29%	-13.29%
Hamilton	141	35.97%	245	62.50%	6	392	44.70%	-26.53%
Herkimer	1,507	44.01%	1,873	54.70%	44	3,424	34.22%	-10.69%
Jefferson	2,579	48.80%	2,656	50.26%	50	5,285	34.96%	-1.46%
Kings (Brooklyn)	183,662	59.07%	123,872	39.84%	3,372	310,906	36.42%	19.23%
Lewis	492	40.53%	703	57.91%	19	1,214	28.88%	-17.38%
Livingston	1,685	39.86%	2,516	59.52%	26	4,227	42.23%	-19.66%
Madison	2,039	44.12%	2,528	54.71%	54	4,621	41.82%	-10.58%
Monroe	39,310	51.60%	36,490	47.90%	380	76,180	43.85%	3.70%
Montgomery	1,298	42.31%	1,732	56.45%	38	3,068	33.64%	-14.15%
Nassau	74,870	62.14%	44,731	37.13%	884	120,485	32.59%	25.01%
New York (Manhattan)	190,806	65.42%	98,194	33.67%	2,656	291,656	47.20%	31.75%
Niagara	8,202	46.48%	9,294	52.67%	149	17,645	34.09%	-6.19%
Oneida	6,586	45.21%	7,739	53.12%	243	14,568	33.81%	-7.91%
Onondaga	21,786	52.90%	19,186	46.59%	212	41,184	41.40%	6.31%
Ontario	4,040	47.31%	4,445	52.05%	55	8,540	43.88%	-4.74%
Orange	12,855	51.14%	12,077	48.04%	206	25,138	33.12%	3.09%
Orleans	725	43.36%	923	55.20%	24	1,672	31.43%	-11.84%
Oswego	2,631	43.98%	3,273	54.71%	78	5,982	35.11%	-10.73%
Otsego	1,995	40.72%	2,868	58.54%	36	4,899	47.17%	-17.82%
Putnam	3,718	49.00%	3,832	50.50%	38	7,588	42.73%	-1.50%
Queens	133,210	61.32%	81,782	37.64%	2,272	217,244	32.15%	23.68%
Rensselaer	5,068	41.76%	7,003	57.70%	66	12,137	43.14%	-15.94%
Richmond (Staten Island)	17,612	52.40%	15,471	46.03%	530	33,613	28.17%	6.37%
Rockland	17,868	59.78%	11,790	39.44%	233	29,891	35.11%	20.33%
St. Lawrence	3,142	44.04%	4,425	57.87%	53	7,646	35.72%	−16.78%
Saratoga	7,672	44.04%	9,694	55.65%	104	17,419	45.81%	−11.61%
Schenectady	6,526	47.05%	7,241	52.20%	15	13,871	40.12%	−5.15%
Schoharie	706	36.45%	1,216	62.78%	8	1,937	40.93%	−26.33%
Schuyler	548	38.27%	876	61.17%	12	1,432	44.27%	−22.91%
Seneca	1,125	47.19%	1,247	52.31%	79	2,384	40.18%	−5.12%
Steuben	2,149	41.86%	2,926	56.99%	59	5,134	36.61%	−15.13%
Suffolk	53,420	54.80%	44,033	45.14%	25	97,478	32.07%	9.63%
Sullivan	2,369	44.12%	2,958	55.09%	42	5,369	31.84%	−10.97%
Tioga	1,318	40.12%	1,936	58.93%	31	3,285	41.14%	-18.81%
Tompkins	6,138	37.60%	10,130	62.06%	56	16,324	63.40%	-24.45%
Ulster	7,642	37.90%	12,435	61.68%	84	20,161	50.70%	-23.77%
Warren	1,868	39.21%	2,871	60.26%	25	4,764	46.75%	-21.05%
Washington	1,292	36.08%	2,274	63.50%	15	3,581	41.49%	-27.42%
Wayne	1,988	44.56%	2,436	54.61%	37	4,461	34.17%	-10.04%
Westchester	74,900	66.87%	36,753	32.81%	354	112,007	42.45%	34.06%
Wyoming	639	39.89%	958	59.80%	5	1,602	30.12%	-19.91%
Yates	637	46.46%	720	52.52%	14	1,371	42.98%	-6.05%
Total	1,133,980	57.54%	820,256	41.62%	16,667	1,970,703	37.41%	15.93%

Note: New York State is a closed primary state, meaning the turnout is based on active enrolled democrats by county on April 1, 2016. Blank, void, and scattering votes (BVS) are only for blank and void, since there was not other candidate on the ballot or the ability to write-in.

==== New York City results ====
2016 Democratic primary	Manhattan	The Bronx	Brooklyn	Queens	Staten Island	Total
Hillary Clinton	190,806	105,719	183,662	133,210	17,612	631,009
Hillary Clinton	64.42%	68.76%	59.07%	61.32%	52.40%	62.65%
Bernie Sanders	98,194	46,189	123,872	81,762	15,471	365,488
Bernie Sanders	33.67%	30.04%	39.84%	37.64%	46.03%	36.29%
Blank, Void	2,656	1,834	3,372	2,272	530	10,664
Blank, Void	1.91%	1.2%	1.09%	1.04%	1.57%	1.06%
TOTAL	291,656	153,742	310,906	217,244	33,613	1,007,161
TURNOUT	47.20%	31.31%	36.42%	32.15%	28.17%	36.52%

== Analysis ==
Clinton won a 16-point victory in her home state. Exit polls showed that Sanders won among voters age 18–29 in the Empire State, capturing 65% of this demographic, while Clinton won every other age group, performing better with older groups (53% of voters ages 30–44, 63% of voters aged 45–54, and 73% of voters aged 65 and over). Clinton tied men with Sanders 50-50, but won a 63–37 landslide among women (both married and unmarried). The candidates split the white vote 50–50, but Clinton won the African American vote 75–25 and the Hispanic/Latino vote 64–36. Clinton swept all income levels/socioeconomic statuses and educational attainment levels in her home state.

In terms of political ideology, Clinton won 62–38 among Democrats while Sanders won 72–28 among Independents, who were 14% of the electorate. Clinton won both liberals and moderate/conservative voters. She won among union households 58–42, and won both married and unmarried voters. In terms of religious affiliation, Clinton won Protestants 65–35, Catholics 62–38, and also won the Jewish vote by a 2 to 1 margin after Sanders caused controversy by criticizing Israel. Sanders won agnostic/atheist voters 57–43. While Clinton won voters who said Wall Street does more to help the economy, Sanders won among those who said it hurts the economy.

Clinton performed very well on Long Island and in the five boroughs of New York City, particularly in Manhattan, Queens and the Bronx; she also won handily in Brooklyn and Staten Island. Clinton ran up big margins in New York City neighborhoods like Harlem, where the percentage of African American voters was highest. Sanders did better in rural, whiter upstate New York counties, with Clinton winning Buffalo, Syracuse, and Rochester while Sanders won in Albany. Sanders also performed well in the Hudson Valley, with a high concentration of liberals and college students.

== Aftermath ==
After winning her home state convincingly, Clinton told supporters, "New Yorkers, you've always had my back and I've always tried to have yours [...] Today together we did it again and I am deeply, deeply grateful."

Following his primary, a Manhattan attorney filed suit, seeking a temporary restraining order to block certification of the presidential primary election by New York City Board of Elections and the state elections board based on his argument that New York's closed primary system violated the state Constitution. This argument was rejected by the New York Supreme Court (the state trial court).

== See also ==
- 2016 New York Republican presidential primary
