= Sterzenbach =

Sterzenbach may refer to:

- Sterzenbach (Kahl), a river of Bavaria, Germany, tributary of the Kahl

== People with that surname ==
- Benno Sterzenbach (1916–1985), German cinema and theatre actor and director
- Norm Sterzenbach, American political strategist
- Rüdiger Sterzenbach (born 1946), German professor, manager and sports official
