= 2016 Iowa Democratic presidential caucuses =

- February 1, 2016

51 Democratic National Convention delegates (44 pledged, 7 unpledged)

Candidate	Hillary Clinton	Bernie Sanders
Home state	New York	Vermont
Delegate count	23	21
SDEs	700.47	696.92
Percentage (of SDEs)	49.84%	49.59%
Iowa results by county (state delegate equivalents)
Clinton
40 – 50%
50 – 60%
60 – 70%
70 – 80%
Sanders
40 – 50%
50 – 60%
60 – 70%
70 – 80%
Tie
40 – 50%
50%

The 2016 Iowa Democratic presidential caucuses were held on Monday February 1 in Iowa, as usual marking the Democratic Party's first nominating contest in their series of presidential primaries ahead of the 2016 presidential election.

The Republican Party held its own Iowa caucuses on the same day.

Hillary Clinton eked out a razor-thin victory over Bernie Sanders in the first-in-the-nation Iowa Caucus by the closest margin in the history of the contest: 49.8% to 49.6% (Clinton collected 700.47 state delegate equivalents to Sanders' 696.92, a difference of one quarter of a percentage point). The victory, which was projected to award her 23 pledged national convention delegates (two more than Sanders), made Clinton the first woman to win the Caucus and marked a clear difference from 2008, where she finished in third place behind Obama and John Edwards.

According to entrance polls, Hillary Clinton owed her razor-thin victory to a slight advantage among white voters, voters over 45, and women.

Martin O'Malley suspended his campaign after a disappointing third-place finish with only 0.5% of the state delegate equivalents awarded, leaving Clinton and Sanders the only two major candidates in the race.

171,517 people participated in the 2016 Iowa Democratic caucuses.

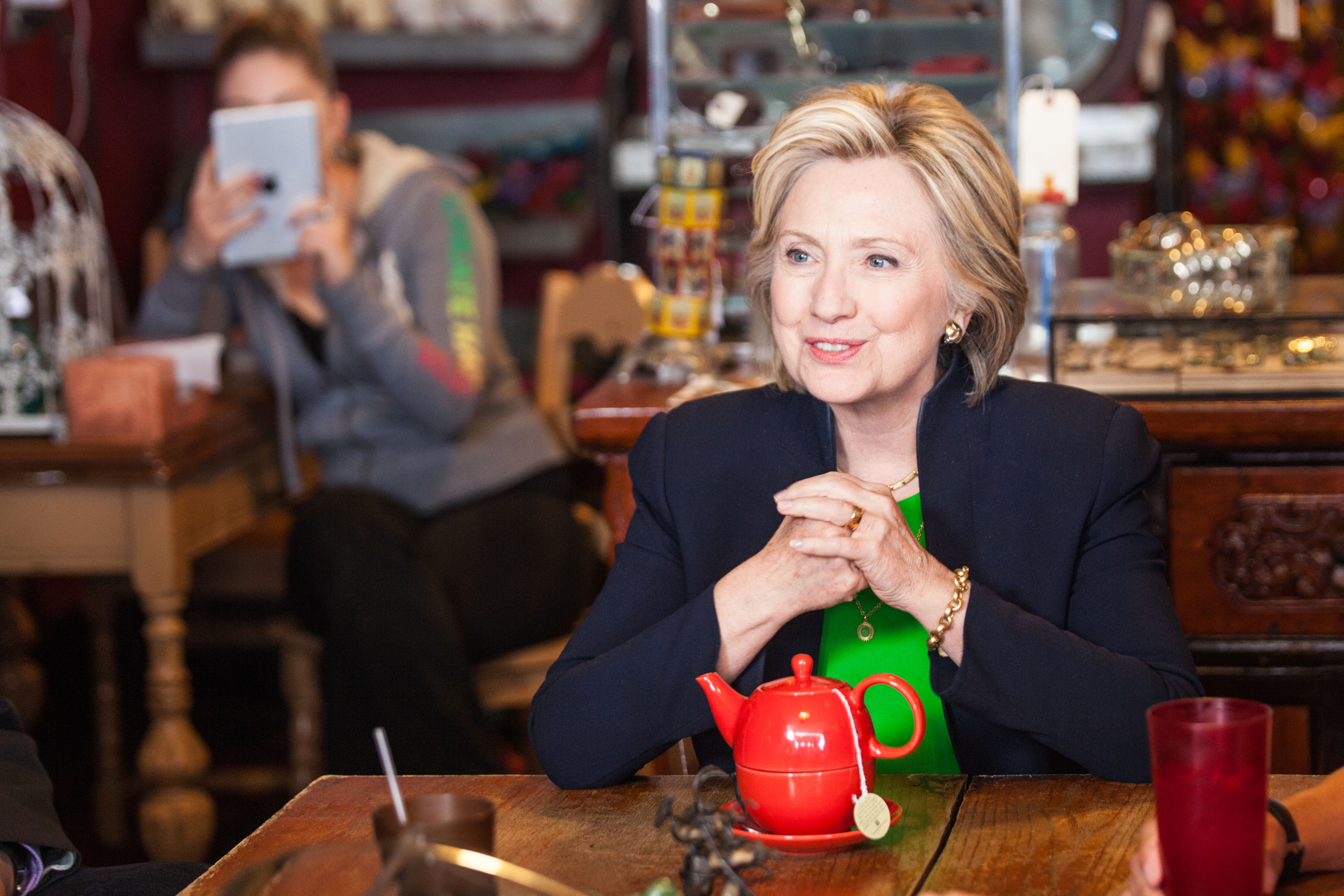
Hillary Clinton launched her campaign in Iowa, April 2015

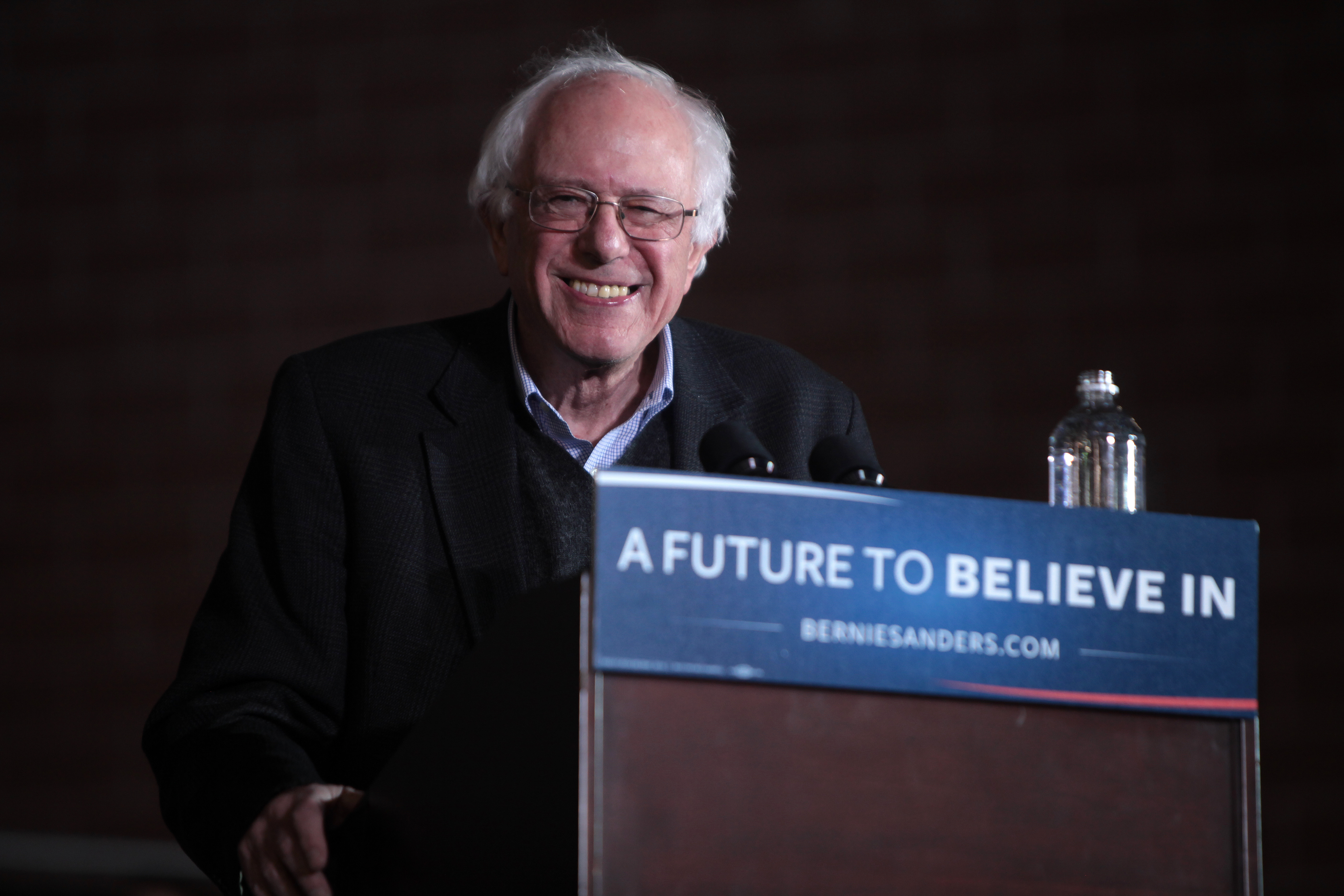
Bernie Sanders campaigns in Iowa in January 2016

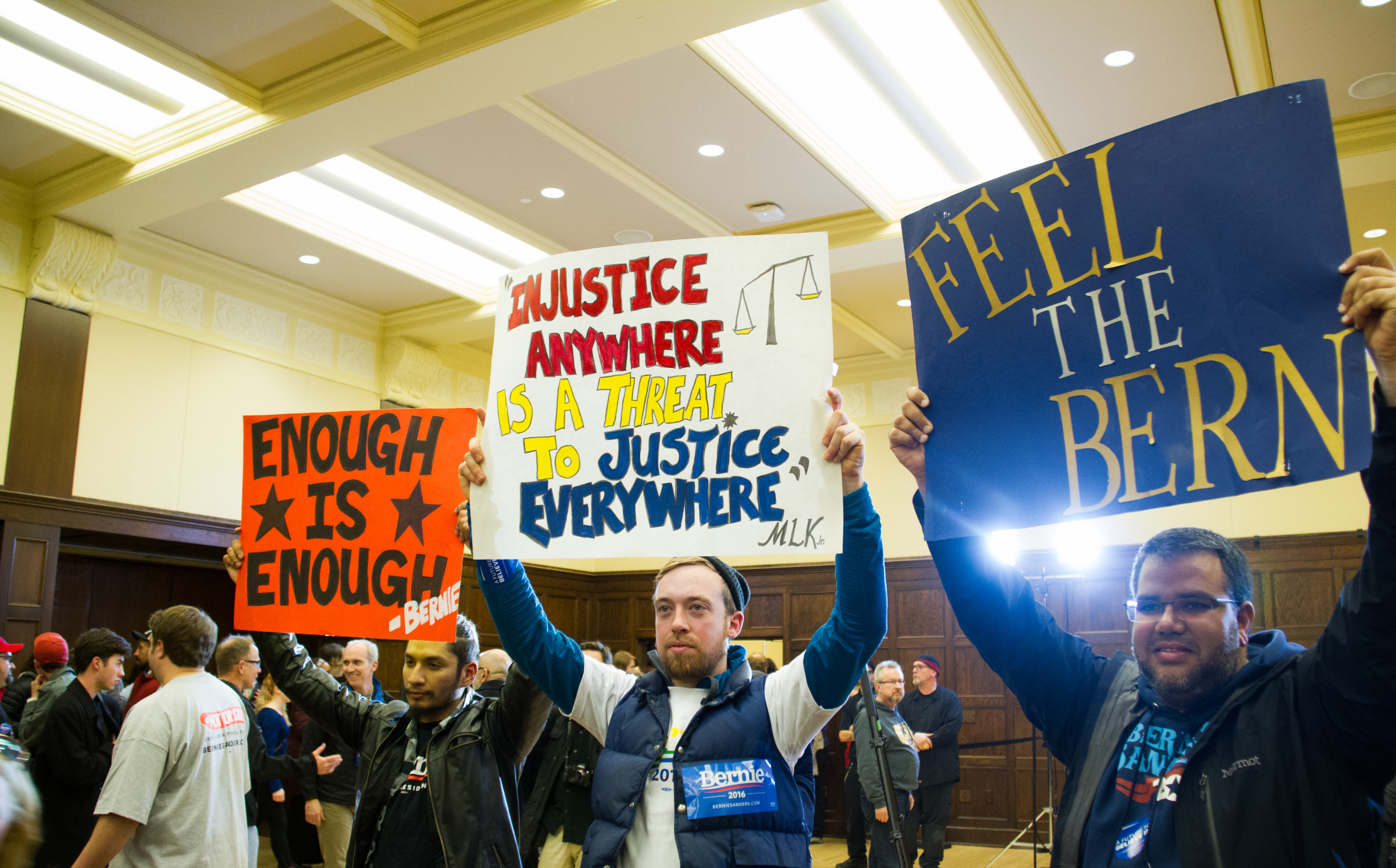
Sanders supporters in Iowa, January 31, 2016

== Procedure ==
There was no ballot; instead, a unique form of debate and groupings chose delegates to county conventions supporting Hillary Clinton, Martin O'Malley, and Bernie Sanders. The Iowa Democratic Party did not release vote counts or the numbers of these delegates. Instead, they released the estimated amount of state delegates supporting each candidate. The county conventions selected delegates to district and state conventions, which in turn selected the delegates to the Democratic National Convention. The delegates at the county, district and state conventions were not pledged and were allowed to change their preference, meaning that the final result of the state delegates could have been different from what was estimated at the Iowa precinct caucuses.

Delegates to the 2016 Democratic National Convention were selected at district and state conventions. The First and Second congressional districts received 8 district delegates, the Third received 7 and the Fourth received 6. These district delegates were elected at the District Conventions based on the result in each Congressional District.

At the State Convention, the 15 statewide pledged delegates were elected based on the statewide results. 9 of these delegates were At-Large and 6 were Party Leaders and Elected Officials (PLEO) who were pledged based on the proportion of At-Large delegates supporting candidates. The Iowa delegation also included 8 superdelegates who were not pledged based on the result of the caucus process, which included 1 U.S. Representative and 7 Democratic National Committee members.

== Debates and forums ==
=== November 2015 debate in Des Moines ===
On November 14, 2015, the Democratic Party held a second presidential debate at the Sheslow Auditorium at Drake University in Des Moines, Iowa. Hosted by CBS News Political Director John Dickerson, it aired on CBS News and was also broadcast by KCCI and The Des Moines Register. With the remaining candidates Hillary Clinton, Bernie Sanders, and Martin O'Malley participating, it was the first debate to be broadcast over nationwide network television, the previous debate having gone over cable.

As the day before the debate, November 13, was the day of the November 2015 Paris attacks, CBS announced that the debate would focus on foreign policy and terrorism. In addition, a moment of silence was held at the beginning of the debate in memory of the victims.

=== January 2016 forum in Des Moines ===
On January 11, 2016 the "Black and Brown" forum was held at Drake University in Des Moines, Iowa. Focusing on minority issues, it aired on Fusion.

== Opinion polling ==
Poll source	Date	1st	2nd	Other
Caucus results	February 1, 2016	Hillary Clinton; 49.9%	Bernie Sanders; 49.6%	Martin O'Malley 0.6%
Emerson College; Margin of error: ± 5.6% Sample size: 300	January 29–31, 2016	Hillary Clinton; 51%	Bernie Sanders; 43%	Martin O'Malley 4% Undecided 2%
Quinnipiac University; Margin of error: ± 3.2% Sample size: 919	January 25–31, 2016	Bernie Sanders; 49%	Hillary Clinton; 46%	Martin O'Malley 3% Undecided 2%
Des Moines Register– Bloomberg–Selzer; Margin of error: ± 4% Sample size: 602	January 26–29, 2016	Hillary Clinton; 45%	Bernie Sanders; 42%	Martin O'Malley 3% Undecided or Not Committed 9%
Public Policy Polling Margin of error ± 3.4% Sample size: 851	January 26–27, 2016	Hillary Clinton; 48%	Bernie Sanders; 40%	Martin O'Malley 7% No preference 5%
Gravis Marketing Margin of error ± 3% Sample size: 810	January 26–27, 2016	Hillary Clinton; 53%	Bernie Sanders; 42%	Martin O'Malley 5% No preference 0%
Monmouth University Margin of error ± 4.4% Sample size: 504	January 23–26, 2016	Hillary Clinton; 47%	Bernie Sanders; 42%	Martin O'Malley 6% Undecided 5%
American Research Group Margin of error ± 5.0% Sample size: 400	January 21–24, 2016	Bernie Sanders; 48%	Hillary Clinton; 45%	Martin O'Malley 3% No preference 4%
Quinnipiac University Margin of error: ± 4% Sample size: 606	January 18–24, 2016	Bernie Sanders; 49%	Hillary Clinton; 45%	Martin O'Malley 4% Undecided 2%
ISU/WHO-HD Margin of error: ± Sample size: 356	January 5–22, 2016	Hillary Clinton; 47%	Bernie Sanders; 45%	Martin O'Malley <1% Undecided 7%
Fox News Margin of error ± 4.5% Sample size: 432	January 18–21, 2016	Hillary Clinton; 48%	Bernie Sanders; 42%	Martin O'Malley 3% No preference 7%
YouGov/CBS News Margin of error ± 8.9% Sample size: 906	January 17–21, 2016	Bernie Sanders; 47%	Hillary Clinton; 46%	Martin O'Malley 5% No preference 2%
Emerson College Polling Society Margin of error: ± 5.9% Sample size: 271	January 18–20, 2016	Hillary Clinton; 52%	Bernie Sanders; 43%	Martin O'Malley 3% Undecided 2%
CNN/ORC Margin of error: ± 6% Sample size: 280	January 15–20, 2016	Bernie Sanders; 51%	Hillary Clinton; 43%	Martin O'Malley 4% Undecided 2%
Monmouth College/KBUR Margin of error: ± 4.1% Sample size: 500	January 18–19, 2016	Hillary Clinton; 47.7%	Bernie Sanders; 39.3%	Martin O'Malley 7.4% Undecided 5%
Loras College Margin of error: ± 4.4% Sample size: 580	January 8–10, 2016	Hillary Clinton; 46%	Bernie Sanders; 40%	Martin O'Malley 8% Undecided 5%
Public Policy Polling Margin of error: ± 4.1% Sample size: 580	January 8–10, 2016	Hillary Clinton; 46%	Bernie Sanders; 40%	Martin O'Malley 8% Undecided 5%
Bloomberg/DMR Margin of error: ± 4.4% Sample size: 503	January 7–10, 2016	Hillary Clinton; 42%	Bernie Sanders; 40%	Martin O'Malley 4% Other/Undecided 14%
American Research Group Margin of error: ± 4.0% Sample size: 600	January 6–10, 2016	Bernie Sanders; 47%	Hillary Clinton; 44%	Martin O'Malley 3% Undecided 5%
Quinnipiac University Margin of error: ± 4.4% Sample size: 492	January 5–10, 2016	Bernie Sanders; 49%	Hillary Clinton; 44%	Martin O'Malley 4% Undecided 3%
Mason-Dixon/AARP Margin of error: ± Sample size: 503	January 4–8, 2016	Hillary Clinton; 49%	Bernie Sanders; 42%	Martin O’Malley 5% Not Reported 4%
NBC News/WSJ/Marist Margin of error: ± 4.8% Sample size: 422	January 2–7, 2016	Hillary Clinton; 48%	Bernie Sanders; 45%	Martin O’Malley 5% Undecided 3%

Polls in 2015

Poll source	Date	1st	2nd	Other
Gravis Marketing Margin of error ± 5% Sample Size: 418	December 18–21, 2015	Hillary Clinton; 49%	Bernie Sanders; 31%	Martin O'Malley 10% Unsure 10%
YouGov/CBS News Margin of error ± 5.3% Sample Size: 1252	December 14–17, 2015	Hillary Clinton; 50%	Bernie Sanders; 45%	Martin O'Malley 4% No preference 1%
Public Policy Polling Margin of error: ± 4.3% Sample Size: 526	December 10–13, 2015	Hillary Clinton; 52%	Bernie Sanders; 34%	Martin O'Malley 7% Undecided 6%
Quinnipiac University Margin of error: ± 3.6% Sample Size: 727	December 4–13, 2015	Hillary Clinton; 51%	Bernie Sanders; 40%	Martin O'Malley 6% Undecided 3%
Fox News Margin of error: ± 5.0% Sample Size: 357	December 7–10, 2015	Hillary Clinton; 50%	Bernie Sanders; 36%	Martin O'Malley 5% Other 4% Undecided 10%
Loras College Margin of error: ± 4.4; Sample Size: 501	December 7–10, 2015	Hillary Clinton; 59%	Bernie Sanders; 27%	Martin O'Malley 4% Undecided 10%
Des Moines Register/Bloomberg/Selzer Margin of error ± 4.9% Sample Size: 404	December 7–10, 2015	Hillary Clinton; 48%	Bernie Sanders; 39%	Martin O'Malley 4% Undeicded 8%
Monmouth Margin of error ± 4.9% Sample Size: 405	December 3–6, 2015	Hillary Clinton; 55%	Bernie Sanders; 33%	Martin O'Malley 6%
CNN/ORC Margin of error ± 4.5% Sample Size: 442	November 28 – December 6, 2015	Hillary Clinton; 54%	Bernie Sanders; 36%	Martin O'Malley 4%
Quinnipiac University Margin of error ± 4.2% Sample Size: 543	November 16–22, 2015	Hillary Clinton; 51%	Bernie Sanders; 42%	Martin O'Malley 4% Undecided 3%
YouGov/CBS News Margin of error ± 7.6% Sample Size: 602	November 15–19, 2015	Hillary Clinton; 50%	Bernie Sanders; 44%	Martin O'Malley 5% Undecided 1%
CNN/ORC Margin of error ± 4.5% Sample Size: 498	October 29 – November 4, 2015	Hillary Clinton; 55%	Bernie Sanders; 37%	Martin O'Malley 3% None 1% No Opinion 3%
Gravis Marketing/One America News Network Margin of error ± 3.0% Sample Size: 272	October 30 – November 2, 2015	Hillary Clinton; 57.1%	Bernie Sanders; 24.8%	Martin O'Malley 2.9% Not Sure 15.2%
Public Policy Polling Margin of error ± 3.9% Sample Size: 615	October 30 – November 1, 2015	Hillary Clinton; 57%	Bernie Sanders; 25%	Martin O'Malley 7% Lawrence Lessig 1% Not Sure 9%
KBUR-Monmouth Margin of error: ± 3.76% Sample size: 681	October 29–31, 2015	Hillary Clinton; 45.8%	Bernie Sanders; 31.7%	Martin O'Malley 5.4% Undecided 17.0%
Monmouth University Margin of error ± 3.76% Sample size: 681	October 29–31, 2015	Hillary Clinton; 45.8%	Bernie Sanders; 31.7%	Martin O'Malley 5.4% Undecided 17%
Monmouth University Margin of error ± 4.9% Sample size: 400	October 22–25, 2015	Hillary Clinton; 65%	Bernie Sanders; 24%	Martin O'Malley 5% Lawrence Lessig 1% Undecided 5%
YouGov/CBS News Margin of error ± 6.9% Sample size: 555	October 15–22, 2015	Hillary Clinton; 46%	Bernie Sanders; 43%	Martin O'Malley 3% Lincoln Chafee 1% Lawrence Lessig 0% No preference 7%
Des Moines Register/Bloomberg Politics Margin of error ± 4.9% Sample size: 402	October 16–19, 2015	Hillary Clinton; 48%	Bernie Sanders; 41%	Martin O'Malley 2% Jim Webb 1% Lincoln Chafee 1% Uncommitted 3% Not Sure 4%
NBC News/WSJ/Marist Margin of error: ± 5.3% Sample size: 348	September 23–30, 2015	Hillary Clinton; 33%	Bernie Sanders; 28%	Joe Biden 22% Martin O'Malley 3% Jim Webb 1% Lincoln Chafee <1% Undecided 12%
NBC News/WSJ/Marist Margin of error: ± 5.3% Sample size: 348	September 23–30, 2015	Hillary Clinton; 47%	Bernie Sanders; 36%	Martin O'Malley 4% Jim Webb 1% Lincoln Chafee <1% Undecided 13%
Public Policy Polling Margin of error ± 4.4% Sample size: 494	September 18–20, 2015	Hillary Clinton; 43%	Bernie Sanders; 22%	Joe Biden 17% Martin O'Malley 3% Jim Webb 3% Lincoln Chafee 2% Lawrence Lessig 0% Undecided 9%
YouGov/CBS News Margin of error ± 6.6% Sample size: 646	September 3–10, 2015	Bernie Sanders; 43%	Hillary Clinton; 33%	Joe Biden 10% No preference 7% Martin O'Malley 5% Lincoln Chafee 1% Jim Webb 1%
Quinnipiac University Margin of error: ± 3.4% Sample size: 832	Posted September 10, 2015	Bernie Sanders; 41%	Hillary Clinton; 40%	Joe Biden 12% Martin O'Malley 3%
NBC News/Marist Poll Margin of error: ± 5.3% Sample size: 345	Published September 6, 2015	Hillary Clinton; 38%	Bernie Sanders; 27%	Joe Biden 20% Martin O'Malley 4% Jim Webb 2% Lincoln Chafee 1% Undecided 8%
NBC News/Marist Poll Margin of error: ± 5.3% Sample size: 345	Published September 6, 2015	Hillary Clinton; 48%	Bernie Sanders; 37%	Martin O'Malley 4% Jim Webb 2% Lincoln Chafee 1% Undecided 8%
Loras College Margin of error ± 4.37% Sample size: 502	August 24–27, 2015	Hillary Clinton; 48.2%	Bernie Sanders; 22.9%	Joe Biden 16.3% Martin O'Malley 4% Lincoln Chafee 0.6% Jim Webb 0.4% Undecided 6.4%
Selzer & Co. of Des Moines Margin of error: ± 4.9% Sample size: 404	August 23–26, 2015	Hillary Clinton; 43%	Bernie Sanders; 35%	Martin O'Malley 5% Jim Webb 2% Lincoln Chafee 1% Not sure 8% Uncommitted 6%
Selzer & Co. of Des Moines Margin of error: ± 4.9% Sample size: 404	August 23–26, 2015	Hillary Clinton; 37%	Bernie Sanders; 30%	Joe Biden 14% Martin O'Malley 3% Jim Webb 2% Lincoln Chafee 1% Not sure 8% Uncommitted 6%
Suffolk University Margin of error: ± 4.4% Sample size: 500	August 20–24, 2015	Hillary Clinton; 54%	Bernie Sanders; 20%	Joe Biden 11% Martin O'Malley 4% Jim Webb 1% Lincoln Chafee 0% Undecided 9%
CNN/ORC Margin of error: ± 4.5% Sample size: 429	August 7–11, 2015	Hillary Clinton; 50%	Bernie Sanders; 31%	Joe Biden 12% Martin O'Malley 1% Jim Webb 1% Lincoln Chafee 0% Not sure 11%
Public Policy Polling Margin of error: ± 4.1% Sample size: 567	August 7–9, 2015	Hillary Clinton; 52%	Bernie Sanders; 25%	Martin O'Malley 7% Jim Webb 3% Lincoln Chafee 1% Not sure 11%
NBC News/Marist Margin of error: ± 5.5% Sample size: 320	July 14–21, 2015	Hillary Clinton; 49%	Bernie Sanders; 25%	Joe Biden 10% Martin O'Malley 3% Jim Webb 1% Lincoln Chafee <1% Undecided 11%
We Ask America Margin of error: 3.07% Sample size: 1,022	June 27–29, 2015	Hillary Clinton; 63%	Bernie Sanders; 20%	Martin O'Malley 5% Jim Webb 3% Lincoln Chafee 1% Undecided 8%
Quinnipiac University Margin of error: 3.6% Sample size: 761	June 20–29, 2015	Hillary Clinton; 52%	Bernie Sanders; 33%	Joe Biden 7% Martin O'Malley 3% Jim Webb 1% Lincoln Chafee 0% Undecided 5%
Bloomberg Margin of error: 4.9% Sample size: 401	June 19–22, 2015	Hillary Clinton; 50%	Bernie Sanders; 24%	Martin O'Malley 2% Lincoln Chafee 0% Undecided 23%
Morning Consult Margin of error: ? Sample size: 322	May 31 – June 8, 2015	Hillary Clinton; 54%	Bernie Sanders; 12%	Joe Biden 9% Martin O'Malley 1% Jim Webb 1% Lincoln Chafee 0% Other 3% Undecided 20%
Gravis Marketing Margin of error: ± 5.0% Sample size: 434	May 28–29, 2015	Hillary Clinton; 59%	Bernie Sanders; 15%	Martin O'Malley 3% Jim Webb 2% Bill DeBlasio 2% Lincoln Chafee 1% Unsure 17%
Bloomberg/Des Moines Margin of error: ± 4.7% Sample size: 437	May 25–29, 2015	Hillary Clinton; 57%	Bernie Sanders; 16%	Joe Biden 8% Martin O'Malley 2% Jim Webb 2% Uncommitted 6% Not sure 8%
Quinnipiac University Margin of error: ± 3.7% Sample size: 692	April 25 – May 4, 2015	Hillary Clinton; 60%	Bernie Sanders; 15%	Joe Biden 11% Martin O'Malley 3% Jim Webb 3% Lincoln Chafee 0% Undecided 7%
Public Policy Polling Margin of error: ± 4.5% Sample size: 466	April 23–26, 2015	Hillary Clinton; 62%	Bernie Sanders; 14%	Martin O'Malley 6% Jim Webb 3% Lincoln Chafee 2% Undecided 13%
Loras College Margin of error: ± 4.4% Sample size: 491	April 21–23, 2015	Hillary Clinton; 57%	Elizabeth Warren; 14.7%	Joe Biden 5.9% Martin O'Malley 2.4% Bernie Sanders 2% Jim Webb 1.2% Lincoln Chafee 0% Undecided 16.7%
Quinnipiac Margin of error: ± 3.9% Sample size: 619	February 16–23, 2015	Hillary Clinton; 61%	Elizabeth Warren; 19%	Joe Biden 7% Bernie Sanders 5% Jim Webb 2% Martin O'Malley 0% Undecided 6%
NBC News/Marist Margin of error: ± 5.5% Sample size: 321	February 3–10, 2015	Hillary Clinton; 68%	Joe Biden; 12%	Bernie Sanders 7% Jim Webb 1% Martin O'Malley <1% Undecided 12%
Selzer & Co. Margin of error: ± 4.9% Sample size: 401	January 26–29, 2015	Hillary Clinton; 56%	Elizabeth Warren; 16%	Joe Biden 9% Bernie Sanders 5% Jim Webb 3% Martin O'Malley 1% Uncommitted 4% Not sure 6%
Loras College Margin of error: ± 6.06% Sample size: 261	January 21–26, 2015	Hillary Clinton; 48.3%	Elizabeth Warren; 16.5%	Joe Biden 12.6% Bernie Sanders 3.8% Jim Webb 2.3% Martin O'Malley 0.4% Undecided 16.1%

Polls in 2014

Poll source	Date	1st	2nd	Other
Fox News Margin of error: ± 5% Sample size: 352	October 28–30, 2014	Hillary Clinton; 62%	Elizabeth Warren; 14%	Joe Biden 10% Andrew Cuomo 2% Martin O'Malley 2% Other 1% None of the above 2% Don't know 6%
Reuters/Ipsos Margin of error: ± ? Sample size: 552	October 23–29, 2014	Hillary Clinton; 60%	Elizabeth Warren; 17%	Joe Biden 4% Andrew Cuomo 3% Bernie Sanders 2% Kirsten Gillibrand 1% Martin O'Malley 1% Wouldn't vote 12%
Selzer & Co. Margin of error: ± 4.8% Sample size: 426	October 1–7, 2014	Hillary Clinton; 53%	Elizabeth Warren; 10%	Joe Biden 9% John Kerry 7% Bernie Sanders 3% Andrew Cuomo 1% Brian Schweitzer 1% Jim Webb 1% Martin O'Malley 0% Uncommitted 3% Not sure 12%
CNN/ORC Margin of error: ± 5.5% Sample size: 309	September 8–10, 2014	Hillary Clinton; 53%	Joe Biden; 15%	Elizabeth Warren 7% Bernie Sanders 5% Andrew Cuomo 3% Martin O'Malley 2% Deval Patrick 1% Someone else 1% None/No opinion 15%
Suffolk Margin of error: ± 7.09% Sample size: 191	August 23–26, 2014	Hillary Clinton; 66.49%	Elizabeth Warren; 9.95%	Joe Biden 7.85% Andrew Cuomo 4.19% Martin O'Malley 2.09% Undecided 7.85%
NBC News/Marist Margin of error: ± 4.2% Sample size: 539	July 7–13, 2014	Hillary Clinton; 70%	Joe Biden; 20%	Undecided 10%
Vox Populi Polling Margin of error: ± 6.6% Sample size: 223	June 4–5, 2014	Hillary Clinton; 65%	Joe Biden; 18%	Elizabeth Warren 12% Andrew Cuomo 3% Martin O'Malley 2%
Public Policy Polling Margin of error: ±5.2% Sample size: 356	May 15–19, 2014	Hillary Clinton; 59%	Joe Biden; 12%	Elizabeth Warren 11% Cory Booker 3% Andrew Cuomo 3% Mark Warner 2% Kirsten Gillibrand 1% Martin O'Malley 1% Brian Schweitzer 1% Someone else/Not sure 8%
Public Policy Polling Margin of error: ±5.2% Sample size: 356	May 15–19, 2014	Joe Biden; 34%	Elizabeth Warren; 22%	Andrew Cuomo 7% Cory Booker 4% Kirsten Gillibrand 3% Martin O'Malley 2% Brian Schweitzer 1% Mark Warner 1% Someone else/Not sure 26%
Public Policy Polling Margin of error: ±5.2% Sample size: 356	May 15–19, 2014	Elizabeth Warren; 31%	Andrew Cuomo; 14%	Cory Booker 9% Kirsten Gillibrand 5% Martin O'Malley 2% Mark Warner 2% Brian Schweitzer 1% Someone else/Not sure 36%
Suffolk Margin of error: ± 8.4% Sample size: 135	April 3–8, 2014	Hillary Clinton; 62.96%	Elizabeth Warren; 11.85%	Joe Biden 9.63% Mark Warner 1.48% Andrew Cuomo 0.74% Deval Patrick 0.74% Cory Booker 0% Undecided 11.85%
Public Policy Polling Margin of error: ±5.4% Sample size: 335	February 20–23, 2014	Hillary Clinton; 67%	Joe Biden; 12%	Elizabeth Warren 5% Mark Warner 3% Andrew Cuomo 2% Cory Booker 1% Kirsten Gillibrand 0% Martin O'Malley 0% Brian Schweitzer 0% Someone Else/Undecided 10%
Public Policy Polling Margin of error: ±5.4% Sample size: 335	February 20–23, 2014	Joe Biden; 40%	Elizabeth Warren; 13%	Andrew Cuomo 8% Martin O'Malley 5% Cory Booker 2% Kirsten Gillibrand 2% Mark Warner 2% Brian Schweitzer 1% Someone Else/Undecided 28%
Public Policy Polling Margin of error: ±5.4% Sample size: 335	February 20–23, 2014	Elizabeth Warren; 21%	Andrew Cuomo; 11%	Cory Booker 8% Martin O'Malley 6% Kirsten Gillibrand 3% Brian Schweitzer 2% Mark Warner 2% Someone Else/Undecided 47%

Polls in 2013

Poll source	Date	1st	2nd	Other
Cygnal Margin of error: ±2.1% Sample size: 2,175	July 10–12, 2013	Hillary Clinton; 55.6%	Joe Biden; 7.8%	Elizabeth Warren 5% Andrew Cuomo 1.1% Kirsten Gillibrand 0.5% Martin O'Malley 0.2% Unsure 29.7%
Public Policy Polling Margin of error: ±6.1% Sample size: 260	July 5–7, 2013	Hillary Clinton; 71%	Joe Biden; 12%	Elizabeth Warren 5% Kirsten Gillibrand 2% Mark Warner 2% Cory Booker 1% Andrew Cuomo 1% Martin O'Malley 1% Brian Schweitzer 0% Someone Else/Undecided 5%
Public Policy Polling Margin of error: ±6.1% Sample size: 260	July 5–7, 2013	Joe Biden; 51%	Elizabeth Warren; 16%	Andrew Cuomo 9% Cory Booker 6% Kirsten Gillibrand 2% Martin O'Malley 2% Mark Warner 1% Brian Schweitzer 0% Someone Else/Undecided 13%
Public Policy Polling Margin of error: ±6.1% Sample size: 260	July 5–7, 2013	Elizabeth Warren; 20%	Andrew Cuomo; 18%	Cory Booker 12% Kirsten Gillibrand 7% Martin O'Malley 4% Brian Schweitzer 3% Mark Warner 2% Someone Else/Undecided 33%
Public Policy Polling Margin of error: ±5.5% Sample size: 313	February 1–3, 2013	Hillary Clinton; 68%	Joe Biden; 21%	Andrew Cuomo 2% Mark Warner 2% Elizabeth Warren 2% Deval Patrick 1% Kirsten Gillibrand 0% Martin O'Malley 0% Brian Schweitzer 0% Someone Else/Undecided 3%
Public Policy Polling Margin of error: ±5.5% Sample size: 313	February 1–3, 2013	Joe Biden; 58%	Andrew Cuomo; 13%	Elizabeth Warren 7% Kirsten Gillibrand 6% Deval Patrick 3% Mark Warner 2% Brian Schweitzer 1% Martin O'Malley 0% Someone Else/Undecided 11%
Public Policy Polling Margin of error: ±5.5% Sample size: 313	February 1–3, 2013	Andrew Cuomo; 26%	Elizabeth Warren; 17%	Martin O'Malley 8% Kirsten Gillibrand 5% Deval Patrick 3% Brian Schweitzer 2% Mark Warner 2% Someone Else/Undecided 37%
Harper Polling Margin of error: Sample size: 183	January 29, 2013	Hillary Clinton; 65.38%	Joe Biden; 13.74%	Andrew Cuomo 3.85% Undecided 17.03%

== Results ==
2016 Democratic Party's presidential nominating process in Iowa – Summary of results –
Candidate	State delegate equivalents		Estimated delegates		
Candidate	Count	Percentage	Pledged	Unpledged	Total
Hillary Clinton	700.47	49.84%	23	6	29
Bernie Sanders	696.92	49.59%	21	0	21
Martin O'Malley	7.63	0.54%	0	0	0
Uncommitted	0.46	0.03%	0	1	1
Total	1,405.48	100%	44	7	51

Iowa Democratic county conventions, March 13, 2016
Candidate	State delegates		Estimated delegates		
Candidate	Count	Percentage	Pledged	Unpledged	Total
Hillary Clinton	704	50.07%	23	6	29
Bernie Sanders	700	49.79%	21	0	21
Martin O'Malley	1	0.07%	0	0	0
Uncommitted	1	0.07%	0	1	1
Total	1,406	100%	44	7	51
Source: Iowa Democrats

Iowa Democratic District conventions, April 30, 2016
Candidate	State delegates		Estimated delegates		
Candidate	Count	Percentage	Pledged	Unpledged	Total
Hillary Clinton	697	50.40%	23	6	29
Bernie Sanders	686	49.60%	21	0	21
Uncommitted				1	1
Total	1,383	100%	44	7	51
Source: Iowa Democrats

Iowa State Democratic Convention, June 18, 2016
Candidate	State delegates		Estimated delegates		
Candidate	Count	Percentage	Pledged	Unpledged	Total
Hillary Clinton	714	55.56%	23	6	29
Bernie Sanders	571	44.44%	21	0	21
Uncommitted				1	1
Total	1,285	100%	44	7	51
Source: Iowa Democrats

Following a poor result in the caucuses, Martin O'Malley announced he was suspending his campaign.

== Controversy ==
Results of the Iowa Democratic caucus, 2016 Clinton—70-80% Clinton—60-70% Clinton—50-60% Clinton—<50% Tie between Clinton and Sanders Sanders—<50% Sanders—50-60% Sanders—60-70% Sanders—70-80%

"Organizational issues around the caucus", including difficulty identifying volunteers to "oversee individual precinct caucuses," contributed to a "disorganized process that lent itself to chaos and conspiracy theories" according to The Guardian.

Both the Sanders and Clinton campaigns have flagged a very small number of concerns for us, and we are looking at them all on a case-by-case basis.

— Sam Lau, Iowa Democratic Party

After initially refusing to review caucus results, Iowa Democratic Party officials did end up "making updates where discrepancies have been found." With "doubts about which Democratic candidate actually won the Iowa caucuses," there have been "fresh calls for the party to mirror the simple, secret-ballot method" the Republicans use. Stated Norm Sterzenbach, former Iowa Democratic Party executive director who oversaw five election cycles: "It's worth discussing again, but it's not as simple as it sounds." It is said that Clinton won by the thinnest margin in the history of Iowa caucuses.

=== Instances ===
Iowa Democrats reported "discrepancies in caucus results" and confusion over the math of the delegate-awarding system. In Grinnell Ward 1, 19 delegates were awarded to Sanders and seven to Clinton on caucus night. The Iowa Democratic party later shifted one delegate from Sanders to Clinton, but did not notify the precinct secretary, who "only discovered that this happened the next day, when checking the precinct results in other parts of the county."

Other reported discrepancies included:

- the lone caucusgoer in Woodbury County No. 43, who voted for Sanders—but "final results state" Clinton won one county delegate and Sanders zero.
- in Knoxville No. 3, where the count was 58 for Sanders and 52 for Clinton—but official results showed Clinton with five county delegates and Sanders with four.
- the four delegates in Cedar Rapids No. 9 precinct who split evenly between Sanders and Clinton—but only 131 people signed in at the beginning of the caucus with two separate head counts showing 136 people voted.

In Des Moines No. 42, "after everyone had formed initial groups for their preferred candidate," a Clinton supporter addressed O'Malley supporters and undecideds, telling them "they could stay and realign or leave." Some mistakenly believed that meant voting was finished and left early without being counted. In the same precinct, votes were still missing the morning after the caucus. Democrats "from that neighborhood scrambled to find party officials" to report that Sanders won by a margin of two delegates over Clinton. This narrowed Clinton's "excruciatingly close lead" even further—bringing the tally for "delegate equivalents" at that point to Clinton 699.57, Sanders 697.77.

=== Coin tosses ===
The Des Moines Register reported "an unknown number" of county delegates awarded "after the flip of a coin." Sam Lau, a spokesman for the Iowa Democratic Party, said seven coin flips were reported through "the party's smartphone app"—but officials who reported county delegate totals via the app "weren't required to signify if the win was the result of a coin toss." Lau said Bernie Sanders won six of these. The paper identified "six coin flips through social media and one in an interview with a caucus participant"—with Clinton the apparent winner of six of these seven. Any overlap, or its impact on results, between the coin flips identified by the Register and those the party confirmed was not known.

An Iowa Democratic Party official told NPR there were "at least a dozen tiebreakers" decided by a coin toss— and that "Sen. Sanders won at least a handful."

Gone unmentioned so far is that even if Clinton won that Miracle Six — and there were no other coin tosses — it would make little difference in the outcome. That is, in part, because of the complicated way Iowa Democrats allocate their delegates — and what was being reported on election night and what wasn't.

— Domenico Montanaro, NPR

=== Review ===
Sanders' campaign "launched" a review of the results of the caucuses, citing as "complicating factors" the "razor-thin margin", the "arcane" caucusing rules, the reporting delays from some precincts, and the reporting technology used. The campaign is rechecking results precinct-by-precinct, reviewing "math sheets or other paperwork" precinct chairs used and were supposed to return to party officials—then comparing these with results entered into the party's Microsoft app. Rania Batrice, a Sanders spokeswoman, challenged: "Let's compare notes. Let's see if they match."

In an editorial, The Des Moines Register called for an audit of the results, declaring "What happened Monday night at the Democratic caucuses was a debacle, period." First noting that only two-tenths of a percent separated Sanders and Clinton and "much larger margins trigger automatic recounts in other states," they stated:

Too many accounts have arisen of inconsistent counts, untrained and overwhelmed volunteers, confused voters, cramped precinct locations, a lack of voter registration forms and other problems. Too many of us, including members of the Register editorial board who were observing caucuses, saw opportunities for error amid Monday night's chaos.

In lieu of "official paper records" the party had "declined to provide the campaign"—which would show individual precinct vote tallies before they were entered into the party's app the night of the caucuses—the Sanders' campaign was contacting each of its own precinct captains to reconstruct caucus results. Sanders' campaign manager Jeff Weaver said: "I think everybody has an interest in making it as accurate as possible", though "[a]s an empirical matter, we're not likely to ever know what the actual result was".

Let's not blow this out of proportion. This is not the biggest deal in the world. We think, by the way, based on talking to our precinct captains, we may have at least two more delegates."

— Bernie Sanders

== Analysis ==
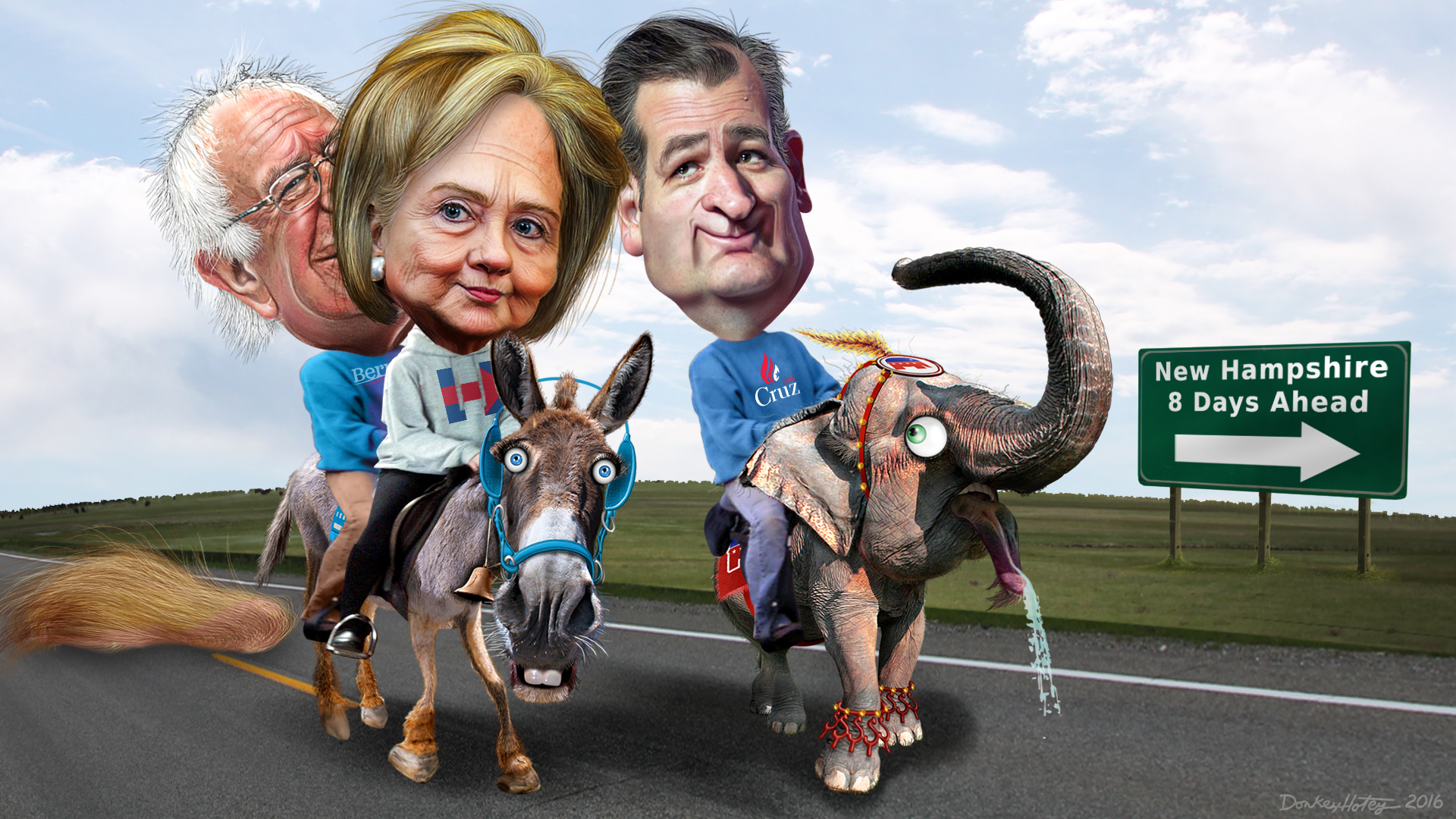
Iowa Caucus Winners – political cartoon by DonkeyHotey

Despite a late challenge from insurgent Senator Bernie Sanders of Vermont, whose populist economic message resonated with Iowa's progressive Democratic electorate, Clinton eked out a 0.2-percentage-point victory in the first-in-the-nation caucus, edging out Sanders by only four state delegate equivalents. As The New York Times described, Sanders' near-tie with Clinton combined with Ted Cruz's Republican victory in the caucus demonstrated how the "2016 campaign has turned to easing the palpable frustrations of a large portion of white working-class Americans who believe that the country no longer works for them."

According to entrance polls, Clinton won the white vote by a 49–46 margin against Sanders, with white voters comprising 91% of the Iowa electorate. She won non-white voters more resoundingly, 58–34. Sanders won among men, 50–44, but Clinton won women, 53-42. Sanders proved his immense strength with millennials by winning 17–29-year-olds 84-14, with Clinton winning senior citizens, 69–26. Clinton won among voters who had a high school diploma or less, and among those who had a postgraduate degree, while Sanders won voters with only a college degree. Sanders won 53-44 among voters who made an income of less than $50k per year, Clinton won more affluent voters 52-42. In terms of political party affiliation, Clinton won Democrats 56-39 but lost Independents to Bernie Sanders, 69–29.

Upon learning she had been awarded the state of Iowa after 1 P.M. the following day, Clinton told CNN's Wolf Blitzer, "My luck was not that good last time around, and it was wonderful to win the caucus, to have that experience."

== See also ==
- 2016 Iowa Republican presidential caucuses
