= Football in Hungary =

- Country: Hungary
- Governing body: Hungarian Football Federation (Hungarian: Magyar Labdarúgó Szövetség)
- National team: Hungary
- First played: 1863; 163 years ago

National competitions
- Hungarian Cup; Hungarian Super Cup

Club competitions
- Hungarian National Championship I Hungarian National Championship II; Hungarian National Championship III

International competitions
- Champions League; Europa League; Europa Conference League; Super Cup; FIFA Club World Cup; FIFA World Cup (National Team); European Championship (National Team); UEFA Nations League (National Team)

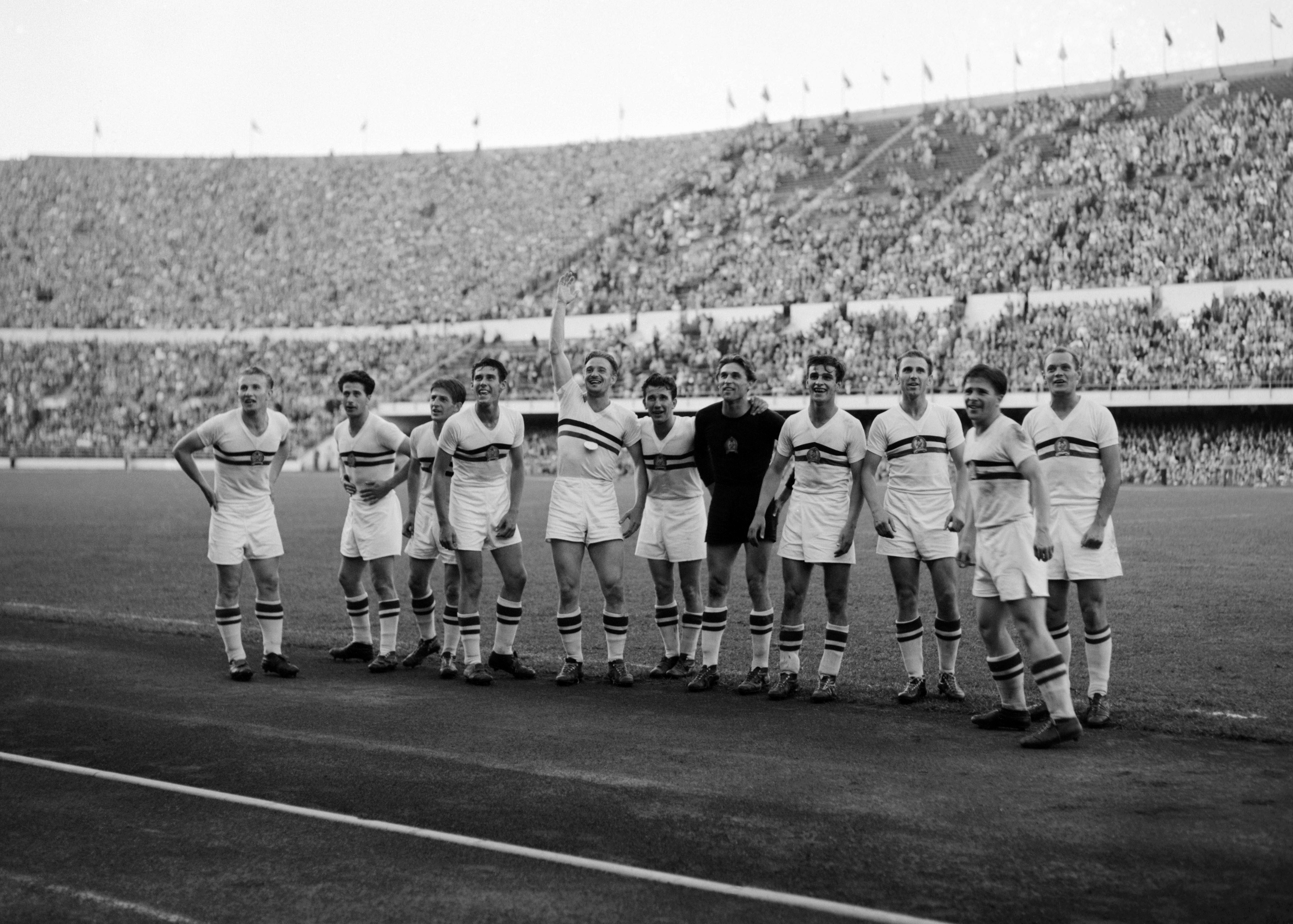
"Mighty Magyars" Hungarian National Football team at the 1952 Summer Olympics.

Football is the most popular sport in Hungary. Approximately 54% of Hungarians are interested in football. However, this was not always the case. Hungary’s acceptance of football began slowly and over time has been closely tied to corresponding political change in the country. The sport was once nearly banned in the country for being too dangerous, but, since the founding of the Hungarian Football Federation, Hungary has been recognized for historically lauded football. The Hungary national team has played in numerous international tournaments, including the inaugural football tournament in the Olympic Games (Stockholm 1912), nine World Cups, and four European Championships. Their greatest achievements are the three gold medals in the 1952, 1964 and 1968 Olympic Games, and the runner-up in the 1938 and 1954 World Cups. The team known as the Mighty Magyars was also the first non-British team to defeat England, 6–3 at Wembley in 1953. Months later, they defeated the English by a convincing 7–1 in Budapest in 1954, the worst defeat in the history of the English team. In recent years, Hungary has tried to regain their previous position in international football but has faced financial and logistical issues.

== History ==
=== Origins ===
The origin of football in Hungary has been attributed to multiple different people and processes. Some of the origin stories include that it was introduced by Károly Löwenrosen at the Millenium Exhibition after learning it abroad in England, or László Kosztovics who went to schools in England and wanted to play it back in his Hungarian home town, or Miksa Eszterházy who introduced the sport following his time as a Hungarian political representative abroad. All agree it was between 1870 and 1900. Another common origin story is that a typewriter salesman, Edward Shires, brought football to Hungary through his club of ex-pats in Vienna, however, evidence has been discovered that football was already being played by this point by day laborers.

=== Pre-1900 ===
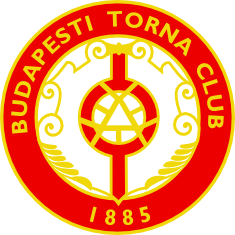
Budapesti Torna Club logo.

The first-ever football club to be founded in Hungary was Budapesti Torna Club having founded its football section in February 1897, dissolved in 1945–46. BTC is soon followed by the founding of the football sections of other important sport clubs in the city: the Magyar Úszó Egylet (MUE), the Budai Football Csapat, the Müegyetemi FC (MFC, later MAFC), the Magyar Athletikai Club (MAC) and the Budapesti Budai Torna Egylet (BBTC). Most of the associations were already operational in other sports and set up their football divisions after the popularisation that came with the first local an international games played by BTC and its followers. The first match between clubs to be played came on 6 February 1898 when BTC played against Müegyetemi FC, with the later winning 5–0 despite BTC having trained the MFC players previously. Nowadays the oldest still active football clubs in Hungary are Műegyetemi FC founded on 1 November of 1897 as a purely football club and III. Kerületi TVE, whose football section was officially opened in 1899 but stemmed from the Budai Football Csapat founded on 31 October 1897.

Despite its initial success, football was nearly banned in 1900 for fear that it was too dangerous after national team players suffered multiple game-related injuries. This led to the need to establish a stricter set of rules for football in Hungary. The Hungarian Football Federation (Hungarian: Magyar Labdarúgó Szövetség or MLSZ), the sport's national governing body, was founded on 19 January 1901 by 13 clubs: BAK, BEAC, BSC, Budapesti TC, Budai Ganzgyár, Ganz Vagongyár, "33" FC, MAC, Magyar FC, Magyar ÚE, Műegyetemi FC, Postás, FTC, who took part in the first championship in 2 tiers that same year. The philosoph Jász Géza of Magyar FC, was nominated the first president of the MLSZ. Vice-presidents were nominated Ferenc Gillemot (MAFC) and Árpád Füzeséry (MUE), secretary general Ferenc Horváth (FTC), treasurer Gabona Károly (Budapesti TC), inspector Ignác Boros (BSC), accountants Róbert Békés (Ganz), Andor Telkes and Ferenc Eisner, and honorary president Károly Iszer (BTC).

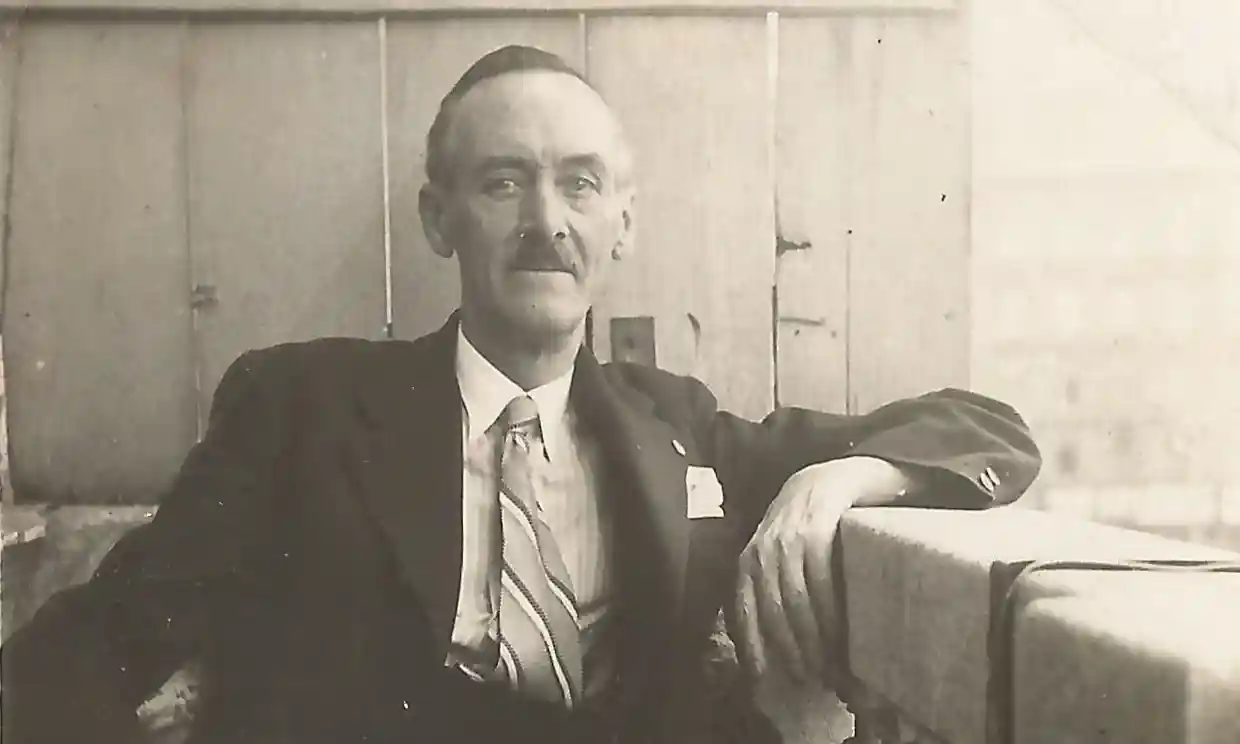
Edward Shires.

In 1911, Edward Shires introduced the idea of bringing in players from other countries by recruiting John Tait Robertson and Joe Lane to MTK Hungária, a primarily Jewish club team. This attempt at globalization, however, was stunted due to the effects of World War I. World War I caused a downturn in Hungarian football due to emigration of players, economic struggles of clubs, and loss of public support. The emigration of players delayed the development of Hungarian football, but led to the spread of Hungarian football strategies. For example, during the interwar era 60 different Hungarian coaches spread Hungarian football to Italy. Going into World War II, Hungarian football was beginning to recover to pre-war popularity.

However, football had become a political tool for the Hungarian government. In 1939, major Jewish football clubs (including MTK Hungária) were disbanded throughout Hungary due to anti-Semitic rhetoric surrounding World War II. During the 1950s and 1960s, the sport had strong financial backing by the government which helped to develop the national team and generate its success. Football was exploited as a political show of power by communist Hungarian powers over the western capitalist powers representing certain victories as belonging to the government rather than the clubs themselves. In the 1980s, the fall of communism in Hungary caused football clubs to fall into bankruptcy which has continued through subsequent attempts to revive the sport.

=== Post-World War II ===
Hungary were regular features at major tournaments, such as the first Olympic Football Tournament (Stockholm 1912) and many FIFA World Cup. They were the first non-UK team to beat England at Wembley Stadium with their 6–3 victory in 1953. The golden age of Hungarian football took place in the 1950s, with the emergence of players of the caliber of Ferenc Puskás, László Kubala, Zoltán Czibor, Sándor Kocsis, Nándor Hidegkuti, Ferenc Szusza, József Bozsik & Gyula Grosics. This team (with the exception of Kubala, who only played 3 games with Hungary before playing for Spain) was known as the Golden Team and remained undefeated for 32 consecutive games, winning the gold medal in the 1952 Olympic Games in Helsinki and reaching the final in the 1954 World Cup in Switzerland, always with Ferenc Puskás as a star (84 goals in 85 matches playing for the Hungary national football team). The twilight of this team that marveled the world came with the Hungarian Revolution of 1956, and after a match of the European Champion's Cup Budapest Honvéd in Bilbao, many of the stars like Czibor, Kocsis and Puskás decided not to return to their country and sign for teams from Western Europe, meaning his retirement from the national team. Puskás joined Real Madrid in 1958, winning three European Cups and debuting with the Spain national football team in 1961, while Czibor and Kocsis joined FC Barcelona. In 1967, the Ferencváros T.C. Flórián Albert became the inaugural Hungarian to win the Golden Ball, surpassing the second place achieved by Puskás seven years before. With the dominant performance of Hungary in the 1950s, football became a source of pride amongst nationalist groups, and they used it as an outlet for nationalist and Soviet tensions causing a culture around rowdiness and racism to form at matches. As the popularity of football rose, the Soviets began to see it as a threat to their regime, and stripped it away from the Hungarian public. As a result, attendance to matches dropped from over 17,000 attendees to less than 3,000.

=== Post-Communism ===
Post soviet rule, the Hungarian government has been trying to pick up the pieces, and bring Hungary back into the football world. This has been difficult, however, with FIFA sanctioning Hungary for racist occurrences at matches. Perhaps the most notable of these occurrences was in the FIFA World Cup Qatar 2022 qualifying match against England that led to sanctions from FIFA because of the behavior of fans who were making racist chants towards English players. Hungary's football team participated in the 1982 and 1986 World Cups.

== Administration ==
Budapest is the location of the headquarters of the Hungarian Football Federation.

== Domestic football ==
Hungary's capital Budapest has seven professional football teams, six of them have won the Hungarian 1st division. Until 1925, teams from Budapest were the only teams in the Hungarian national league despite the existence of teams in other cities. Until July 2012 teams based in Budapest have won the Hungarian Championship 96 times and teams from other cities have won it 14 times.

The Hungarian football clubs have several international successes. Ferencvárosi TC won the 1964–65 edition of the Inter-Cities Fairs Cup and was runner-up in the European Cup Winners' Cup in 1974–75 season and the Cup of Fairs in 1968, while Újpest FC reached the final of the Fair Cup in 1969, Videoton FC the UEFA Cup in 1985, and MTK Budapest FC that of the UEFA Cup Winners' Cup in 1964.

== Youth Football ==
Locations of major Budapest clubs

=== Education after 1989-1990 political shift ===
After the 1989-1990 shift in political power in Hungary professional clubs were still supported by the new government and used all the funds they were given. However, many youth clubs were not given much support from the new government, there wasn't much education of young football players in schools and little to no coaching either. Also, in many cases the education of new football players is integrated into the structure of bigger clubs, who train professional players.

== Domestic tournaments ==
=== Men's leagues ===
Hungarian men's football leagues have three main tiers, with promotion and relegation in-between:

- Nemzeti Bajnokság I
- Nemzeti Bajnokság II
- Nemzeti Bajnokság III

Below the third tier, each county (and Budapest) has three or four additional tiers of leagues, the winner of which may get promoted to NB III:

- Megyei Bajnokság I

=== Men's cups ===
- Magyar Kupa, a cup tournament involving every registered football team in Hungary

=== Women's leagues ===
Hungarian women's football leagues have two tiers, with the second tier split into a Western and Eastern division:

- Női NB I
- Női NB II

=== Women's cups ===
- Hungarian Women's Cup

=== Former tournaments ===
- Szuperkupa, a final match between the men's league and cup winners
- Ligakupa, a cup tournament for teams in the men's league

== Clubs ==
The table below lists all Budapest clubs in the top three tiers of the Hungarian football league system: from the top division (the Nemzeti Bajnokság I), down to the Nemzeti Bajnokság III. League status is correct for the 2012–13 season.

Club	Stadium	Capacity	Founded (Football section)
Nemzeti Bajnokság I (1)
Újpest FC	Szusza Ferenc Stadium	13,501	1885 (1899)
Ferencvárosi TC	Groupama Arena	23,700	1899 (1900)
MTK Budapest	Hidegkuti Nándor Stadium	7,515	1888 (1901)
Budapest Honvéd	Bozsik Stadion	9,500	1909
Nemzeti Bajnokság II (2)
Vasas SC	Illovszky Rudolf Stadion	9,000	1911
Újpest FC "B"	Szusza Ferenc Stadium	13,501	1885 (1899)
Ferencvárosi TC "II"	Stadion Albert Flórián	15,804	2014 (1900)
Budapest Honvéd FC-MFA	Bozsik Stadion, Műfüves Pálya	700	1909
BKV Előre SC	Sport utcai Stadion	2,500	1912
III. Kerületi TVE	Hévízi út	3,000	1887 (1899)
Nemzeti Bajnokság III (3)
Soroksár SC	Szamosi Mihály Sporttelep	5,000	1999
Újbuda TC	Sportmax pálya	500	2007
Pénzügy	réti út	3,000	1950
Rákosszentmihályi AFC	Pirosrózsa utca	2,500	1913
Rákosmenti TK	Péceli út	2,500	1912
Erzsébeti Spartacus MTK	Ady Endre utca	5,000	1909
Csepel SC	Béke téri stadion	12,000	1912
Budafoki LC	Promontor utcai stadion	4,000	1912
Rákospalotai EAC	Budai II László stadion	7,500	1912
Rákosment Községi SK	RKSK-pálya	1,000	1949

== National team ==
The Hungarian national team, in its different categories, is controlled by the Hungarian Football Federation.

The Hungarian team played their first official game on 12 October 1902 in Vienna against Austria, a match that was resolved with a 5–0 win for the Austrians. Hungary has played in nine FIFA World Cups and two European Championships. The best result of Hungary national team was when they reached the FIFA World Cup final twice; they lost to Italy in 1938, and lost again to West Germany in 1954. Since then, Hungary's performance has diminished.

== Football stadiums in Hungary ==
Stadiums with a capacity of 15,000 or higher are included.

Image	Stadium	Location	County	Capacity	Home team	Opened
	Puskás Aréna	Budapest	Budapest, XIV.ker	67,215	Hungary national football team	2019
	Groupama Arena	Budapest	Budapest, IX.ker	23,700	Ferencvárosi TC	2014
	Nagyerdei Stadion	Debrecen	Hajdú-Bihar	20,340	Debreceni VSC	2014
	ETO Park	Győr	Győr-Moson-Sopron	15,600	Győri ETO FC	2008
	Diósgyőri Stadion	Miskolc	Borsod-Abaúj-Zemplén	15,325	Diósgyőri VTK	2018

== Most successful clubs overall ==
As of 16 May 2026

Club	Domestic Titles					European Titles					Overall titles
Club	Nemzeti Bajnokság I	Magyar Kupa	Ligakupa	Szuperkupa	Total	Challenge Cup	Mitropa Cup	Inter-Cities Fairs Cup	Intertoto Cup	Total	Overall titles
Ferencváros	36	25	2	6	68	1	2	1	-	4	72
MTK	23	12	-	3	38	-	2	-	-	2	40
Újpest	20	11	-	3	34	-	2	-	-	2	36
Honvéd	14	8	-	-	22	-	1	-	-	1	23
Debrecen	7	6	1	5	19	-	-	-	-	-	19
Vasas	6	4	-	-	10	-	6	-	-	6	16
Fehérvár	3	2	3	2	10	-	-	-	1	1	11
Győr	5	4	-	1	10	-	-	-	-	-	10
Csepel	4	-	-	-	4	-	-	-	-	-	4
Diósgyőr	-	2	1	-	3	-	-	-	-	-	3
Paks	-	2	1	-	3	-	-	-	-	-	3
Tatabánya	-	-	-	-	0	-	2	-	-	2	2
BTC	2	-	-	-	2	-	-	-	-	-	2
Zalaegerszeg	1	1	-	-	2	-	-	-	-	-	2
Dunaújváros	1	-	-	-	1	-	-	-	-	-	1
Vác	1	-	-	-	1	-	-	-	-	-	1
III. Kerület	-	1	-	-	1	-	-	-	-	-	1
Békéscsaba	-	1	-	-	1	-	-	-	-	-	1
Bocskai	-	1	-	-	1	-	-	-	-	-	1
Kecskemét	-	1	-	-	1	-	-	-	-	-	1
Pécs	-	1	-	-	1	-	-	-	-	-	1
Siófok	-	1	-	-	1	-	-	-	-	-	1
Sopron	-	1	-	-	1	-	-	-	-	-	1
Soroksár	-	1	-	-	1	-	-	-	-	-	1
Szolnok	-	1	-	-	1	-	-	-	-	-	1

== Attendances ==
In the 1959-60 season, Ferencváros drew an average home league attendance of 49,308, the highest by far in that season. This figure also remains the all-time highest average home league attendance for a Hungarian club. Ferencváros was also named Kinizsi and ÉDOSZ.

The average attendance per top-flight football league season and the club with the highest average attendance:

Season	League average	Best club	Best club average
2024–25	4,530	Ferencváros	11,236
2023–24	4,188	Ferencváros	11,340
2022–23	3,541	Ferencváros	10,430
2021–22	—	—	—
2020–21	—	—	—
2019–20	3,310	Ferencváros	9,561
2018–19	3,306	Ferencváros	10,715
2017–18	2,834	Ferencváros	9,066
2016–17	2,695	Ferencváros	6,721
2015–16	2,628	Ferencváros	7,737
2014–15	2,502	Ferencváros	8,532
2013–14	2,913	Ferencváros	8,447
2012–13	2,806	Diósgyőr	6,424
2011–12	3,828	Diósgyőr	7,800
2010–11	2,763	Ferencváros	5,773
2009–10	3,007	Ferencváros	5,323
2008–09	2,953	Szombathelyi Haladás	6,167
2007–08	2,909	Debrecen	5,633
2006–07	2,755	Debrecen	7,567
2005–06	3,123	Debrecen	7,267
2004–05	3,291	Diósgyőr	6,573
2003–04	3,348	Debrecen	5,413
2002–03	3,376	Ferencváros	7,683
2001–02	3,960	Zalaegerszeg	9,234
2000–01	3,724	Ferencváros	7,967
1999–2000	3,706	Zalaegerszeg	6,313
1998–99	5,009	Diósgyőr	9,706
1997–98	5,775	Diósgyőr	12,647
1996–97	4,443	Ferencváros	9,951
1995–96	4,965	Ferencváros	10,594
1994–95	5,866	Ferencváros	11,133
1993–94	5,357	Ferencváros	12,000
1992–93	5,398	Ferencváros	12,258
1991–92	5,586	Ferencváros	12,367
1990–91	5,303	Ferencváros	13,467
1989–90	5,888	Ferencváros	14,800
1988–89	6,925	Ferencváros	17,067
1987–88	7,977	Ferencváros	17,933
1986–87	7,683	Ferencváros	19,420
1985–86	7,581	Ferencváros	18,867
1984–85	7,812	Ferencváros	21,200
1983–84	7,896	Ferencváros	17,048
1982–83	9,576	Ferencváros	18,877
1981–82	7,039	Ferencváros	19,941
1980–81	6,835	Ferencváros	15,526
1979–80	7,597	Ferencváros	16,647
1978–79	6,589	Ferencváros	16,412
1977–78	8,027	Ferencváros	19,706
1976–77	8,820	Ferencváros	20,765
1975–76	10,108	Ferencváros	29,400
1974–75	8,717	Ferencváros	19,467
1973–74	8,163	Ferencváros	19,468
1972–73	7,208	Ferencváros	15,800
1971–72	6,126	Ferencváros	11,733
1970–71	7,067	Ferencváros	14,533
1970	8,668	Ferencváros	27,500
1969	8,343	Ferencváros	14,940
1968	9,392	Ferencváros	18,200
1967	11,311	Ferencváros	26,200
1966	11,951	Ferencváros	29,846
1965	14,516	Ferencváros	38,077
1964	16,086	Ferencváros	43,462
1962-63	14,123	Ferencváros	34,308
1961-62	12,857	Ferencváros	30,000
1960-61	15,291	Ferencváros	34,077
1959-60	16,739	Ferencváros	49,308
1958-59	14,558	Ferencváros	36,308
1957-58	14,613	Ferencváros	39,308
1957	17,083	Ferencváros	48,333
1955	17,179	Kinizsi	45,615
1954	13,365	Kinizsi	35,692
1953	11,015	Kinizsi	31,000
1952	10,058	Kinizsi	23,808
1951	8,559	Kinizsi	20,000
1949-50	7,208	ÉDOSZ	22,000
1948-49	6,676	Ferencváros	22,933
1947-48	6,351	Ferencváros	19,500
1946-47	4,637	Ferencváros	12,667
1945-46	3,060	Ferencváros	11,333
1945	4,210	Ferencváros	9,636
