= Rüdiger Sterzenbach =

German economist

Rüdiger Sterzenbach (born 7 December 1946) is a German economist and transportation scientist, sports official, CDU politician and a representative of a family of entrepreneurs. He was professor for economics and passenger transport management at Heilbronn University of Applied Sciences, former president of the regional sports federation of Rhineland-Palatinate "Landessportbund Rheinland-Pfalz", chairman of the regional sports foundation of Rhineland-Palatinate "Sporthilfe Rheinland-Pfalz/Saarland" and economic policy spokesman for the CDU Rhineland-Palatinate. His father was a factory worker, his mother was a housewife. He is married and has two grown sons.

== Biography ==
Born in Dernbach, Neuwied, Sterzenbach studied economics at the University of Marburg where he was permitted to graduate ahead of time with a degree in economics. He was a research assistant at the research institute for economic policy "Welter Institut" at Johannes Gutenberg University Mainz and received his PhD in economics for his doctoral work entitled "Changes in Parity and Sea Shipping". He was Professor for Economics and Business Administration in Public Transport Management at Heilbronn University of Applied Sciences with temporary functions as Dean, Dean of studies and Heads of Department. He was a representative of the Heilbronn University in the working group for research at universities of applied sciences at the responsible ministry.

Rüdiger Sterzenbach retired with a ceremonial act from university. The ceremonial speech was held by the chairman of the German Football Association Dr. Theo Zwanziger. Commemorating his farewell celebration the publication "Transportation - Theory and Practice" has been released by Frank Fichert. Rüdiger Sterzenbach was amongst others member of the advisory board for the association of Transport Management (Munich) and "VIP-Think Tank - Future of urban mobility" (Vienna). He operated as an arbitrator for the transport associations Rhine-Moselle (VRM) and Rhine-Nahe (RNN). Sterzenbach has been supporting the extensive research study "Public Transportation - Transparency Register" for several years. He was spokesman of the advisory council for the studies of Transport Management and Passenger Transportation at University of Heilbronn and is member of the advisory council of the Tourism / Transportation department at the University of Applied Sciences, Worms. His books "Air Transportation" (as founder and after retirement until present day as co-author) and "Public Transportation Marketing" (under cooperation with Jörg Schwarzer) had become standard works in their field.

Rüdiger Sterzenbach is a representative of economic policy by Ludwig Erhard based on social market economy (Müller-Armack) and fundamental ordoliberal principles (Eucken). Rüdiger Sterzenbach completed a vocational training as a professional driver for passenger transportation.

He provided the blueprint for the first concession competition in public transportation in Germany.

In addition to his academic working activities, Rüdiger Sterzenbach was co-partner of SZ-Verkehrsbetriebe, one of the biggest German private road transport provider with main operations in Rhineland-Palatinate and southern North Rhine-Westphalia. The company held substantial investments of the transport company Rine-Moselle Koblenz and majority shareholding in the transport company of the Stadtwerke Neuwied (Neuwied's municipal utility). The SZ-Verkehrsbetriebe has been sold to Transdev, the French Transportation Corporation. Operational management is the responsibility of Stadtwerke Bonn (Bonn's municipal utility).

Rüdiger Sterzenbach was co-founder of a non-profit organisation for the integration of people with severe disabilities.

== Voluntary services ==
Rüdiger Sterzenbach has been active since his younger days in the CDU, where he occupied various voluntary positions. He was treasurer and economic policy spokesman of the CDU Rhineland-Palatinate. He led, as a voluntary director the publishing and sales organisation of the CDU Rhineland-Palatinate and managed its assets. Furthermore, he has been district chairman for the CDU for the district of Neuwied, where he currently holds the position as honorary chairman. He was a CDU representative for the district council of Neuwied and led the district assembly faction. In addition, he was the chairman of a district organisation of the Union of European Federalists for the district of Neuwied.

Besides his political activities Rüdigter Sterzenbach worked voluntary in different positions in the field of sports. He was chairman of the regional sports foundation of Rhineland-Palatinate, Sporthilfe Rheinland-Pfalz, co founded by him. In addition he was president of the regional sports federation of Rhineland-Palatinate „Landessportbund Rheinland-Pfalz". Among others, he was chairman of the standing conference of regional sports federations and member of the SWR broadcasting council. He was member at the programme advisory board of the German Regional Television (DRF 1).

During his time as president, the studies of sport management at the University of Koblenz/Remagen have been introduced and the action for school sports has been established to emphasise the importance of school sports. Sports were adopted in the state constitution, the quality seal "sports pro health" has been introduced. The "Pierre de Coubertin" - a Graduate Prize has been awarded for the first time and the Eco-Check for sports clubs has been offered. It came to framework agreements between the regional sports federation LSB and the state of Rhineland-Palatinate for school sports, the "Dream Team Rhineland-Palatinate" for supporting top-class sports has been established. Under his responsibility as president, the regional sports federation Rhineland-Palatinate has anchored as first regional sports foundation Gender Mainstream in its statue.

Sterzenbach promoted in particular the partnership between the regional sports federation and the county of Komárom-Esztergom in Hungary. In appreciation of his services the ministry for youth and sports of the republic of Hungary awarded him the "Miksa Esterházy".

The Fair Play Tour d'Europe was held under his patronage.

For his commitment as sports official, he has been awarded with the Order of Merit of the Federal Republic of Germany, the certificate of merit for sports in Europe, the award of the regional sports foundation "Sporthilfe Rheinland-Pfalz" and the certificate of honour of the sports association of Thuringia for his outstanding achievements in promoting sports in the state of Thuringia.

Rüdiger Sterzenbach was briefly voluntary CEO and president of TuS Koblenz, at that time a member of the 2. Bundesliga.

== Honours (excerpt) ==
- 2017 Certificate for achievements for sports in Europe (European Interregional Pool of Sports)
- 2017 Award of the Regional Sports Foundation "Sporthilfe Rheinland-Pfalz"
- 2017 Certificate of honour of the Sports Association of Thuringia for the promotion of sports in the state of Thuringia.
- 2008 Honorary citizen of his home municipality
- 2004 honoured with the German Cross of Merit on ribbon
- 2004 honoured with the sports obelisk by the Minister of Interior of Rhineland-Palatinate
- 2001 honoured with the „Miksa Esterházy" by the Ministry for Youth and Sports of the Republic of Hungary
- 1988 honoured with the „Mérite Européen“ of the Luxembourg foundation „Mérite Européen“

== Literature ==
- Rüdiger Sterzenbach: Social Market Economy - Agenda 2030, A new dawn to a better economic and ecological future. Publisher: LIT, Berlin 2020. ISBN 978-3-643-14615-1.
- Roland Conrady, Frank Fichert, Rüdiger Sterzenbach: Air Transport – Business Manual and Textbook. 6th Edition. Publisher: De Gruyter Oldenbourg, Berlin, January 2019. ISBN 978-3-11-056329-0.
- Rüdiger Sterzenbach: Regulatory Wrong-Way Drivers in Public Transport, Frankfurter Allgemeine Zeitung of 30 November 2018.
- Rüdiger Sterzenbach: Between Hope and Facts: Transport Scientist Sterzenbach analyses the Development of Frankfurt-Hahn Airport, Rhein-Zeitung of 21 August 2016.
- Transportation-Theory und Practice: commemorative publication for Rüdiger Sterzenbach, Frank Fichert (ed.), Publisher: LIT, Berlin 2013. ISBN 978-3-643-11178-4.
- Rüdiger Sterzenbach under cooperation with Jörg Schwarzer: Public Transportation Marketing, a Manual and Textbook, 2nd Edition, Publisher: HUSS, Munich 2001. ISBN 3-931724-46-8.
