= DonkeyHotey =

American political cartoonist

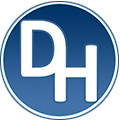
The logo of DonkeyHotey

DonkeyHotey is a pseudonymous American political cartoonist who primarily produces caricatural edits of photos of American politicians using Photoshop. In 2015, Bloomberg News pronounced him (Note: DonkeyHotey's official profile at WhoWhatWhy refers to him using male pronouns.) the "Margaret Keane of political cartooning." His cartoons are provided under Creative Commons licenses for free reproduction and reuse with attribution, and this has led to them being featured on numerous ads, news articles, and magazine covers. The pseudonym "DonkeyHotey" is a reference to Don Quixote, a novel he enjoys; and the Democratic donkey mascot, reflecting his liberal politics. He is currently a contributor to WhoWhatWhy, and previously Esquire.

Political cartoons by DonkeyHotey

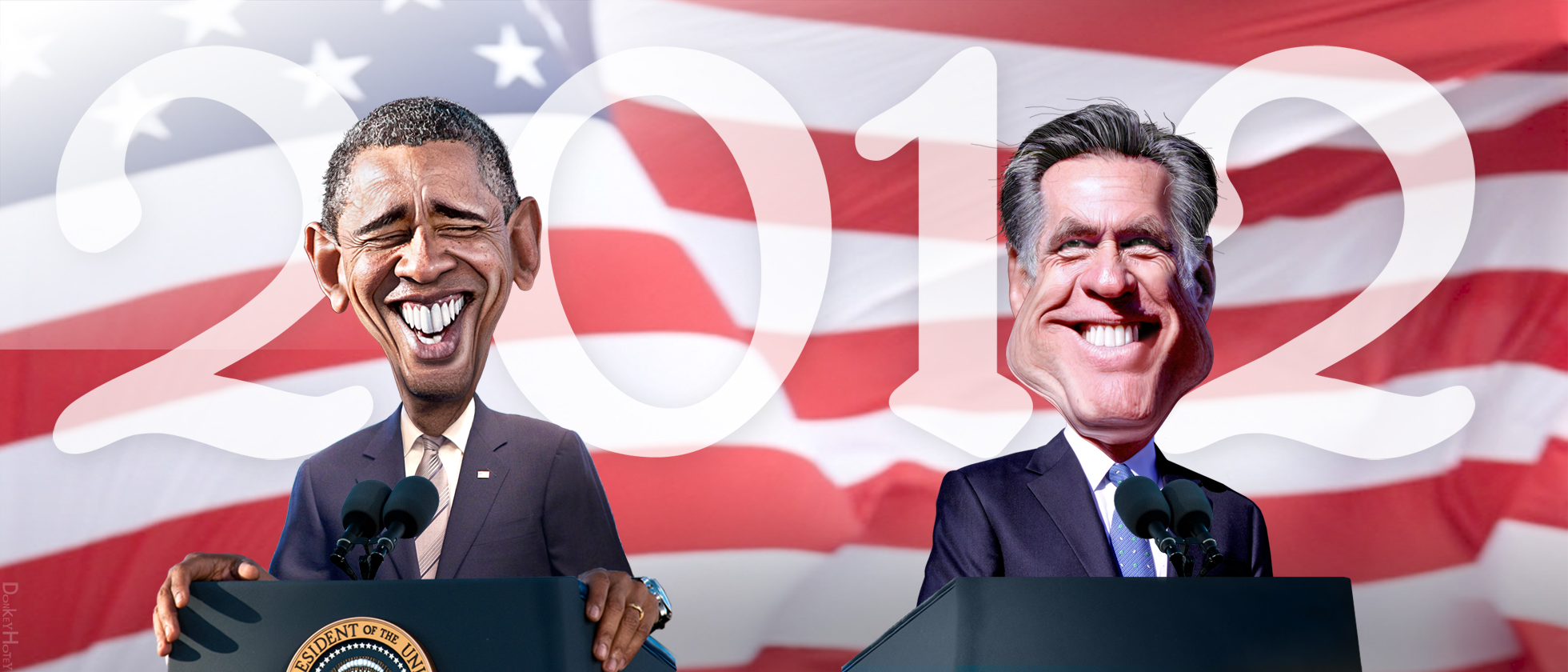
Candidates of the 2012 United States presidential election: Barack Obama (left) and Mitt Romney

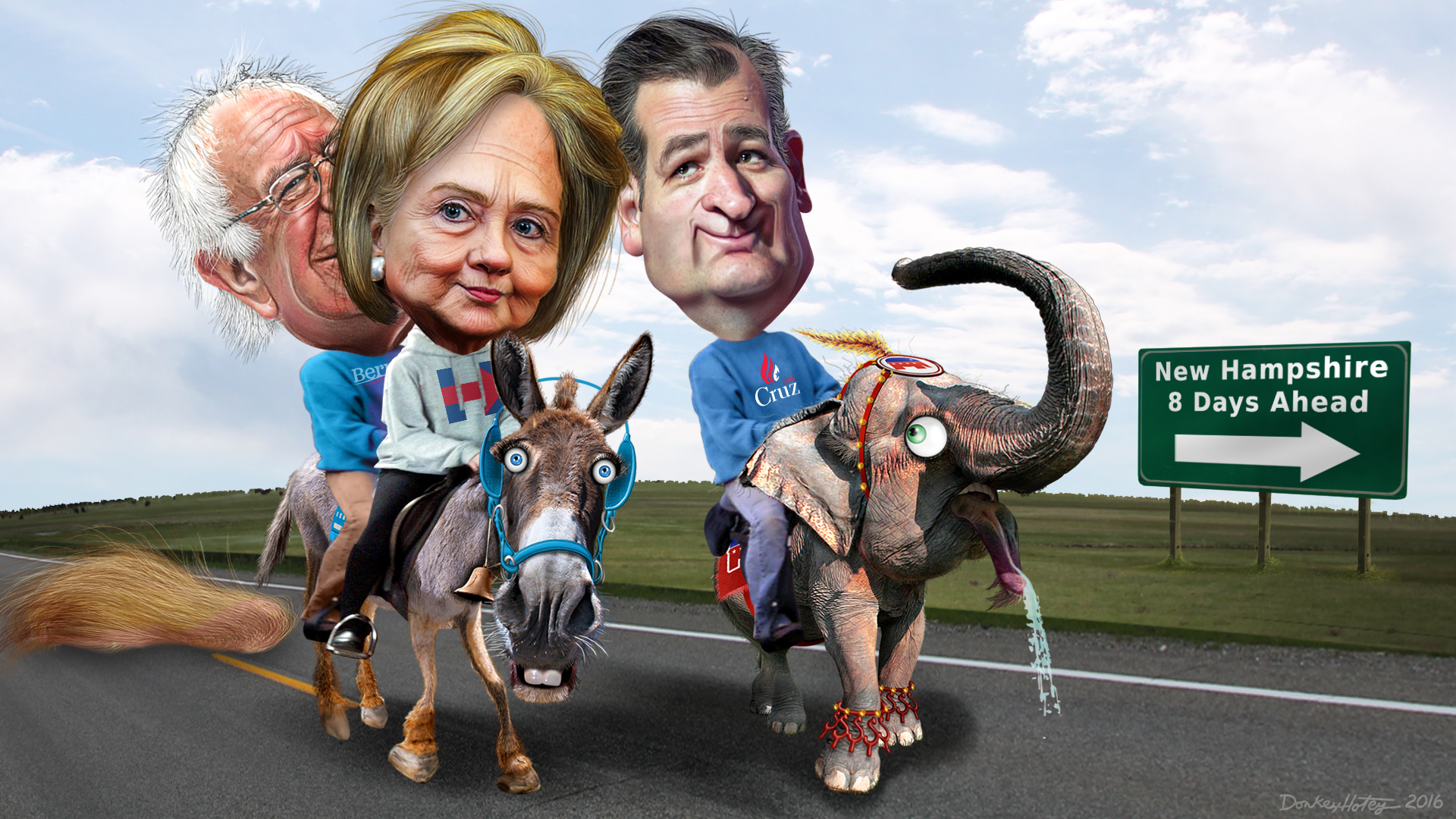
Winners of the 2016 Iowa caucuses. Left to right: Bernie Sanders, Hillary Clinton, Ted Cruz.

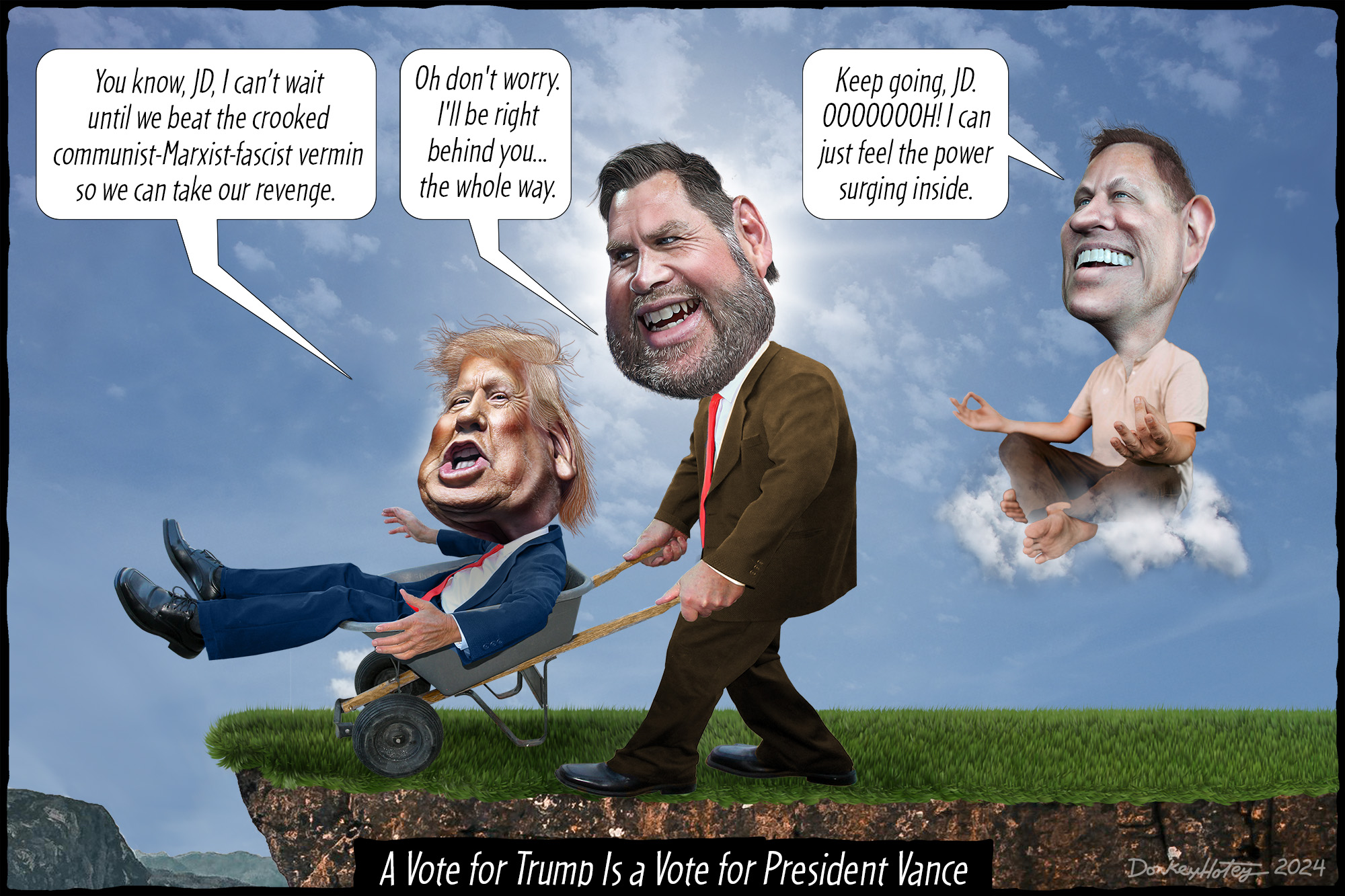
Criticism of the Donald Trump 2024 presidential campaign. Left to right: Donald Trump, JD Vance, Peter Thiel.

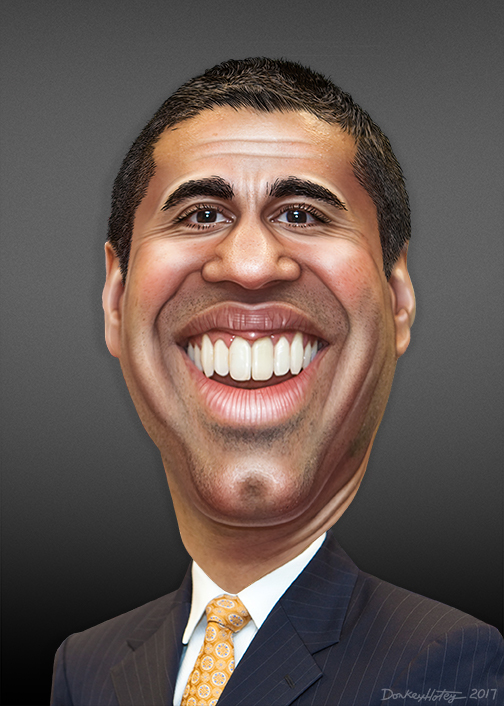
Caricature of FCC chairman Ajit Pai.
