= Norm Sterzenbach =

American political strategist

Norm Sterzenbach is an American political strategist and principal at the public affairs firm GPS Impact. He was formerly the executive director of the Iowa Democratic Party. Because of his extensive knowledge of the intricacies of the Iowa caucus, he has become known in the state as "Mr. Caucus".

== Biography ==
Sterzenbach was born in Cedar Rapids, Iowa, into a Democratic union household. His father, Norm Sterzenbach Sr., was a United States Navy veteran and prominent supporter of the Democratic Party in Iowa.

After receiving his political science degree from the University of Iowa, Sterzenbach began working for the Iowa Democratic Party (IDP), initially as a campaign manager for a targeted race in the Iowa House of Representatives.

In 2000, he served as the eastern Iowa field director for Bill Bradley's unsuccessful presidential campaign, and in 2004, he was the American Association of Retired Persons' caucus director. He became the IDP's political and caucus director in 2006, and in the same year, he served as Chet Culver's deputy campaign manager for his successful run for governor of Iowa in that year's gubernatorial election. While working at the Iowa Democratic Party, he managed the 2008 Iowa Democratic caucuses before being named executive director in 2009. He announced he would be stepping down from his position at the IDP in December 2012, and he was replaced by Troy Price the following month.

In 2019, shortly after Sterzenbach had ended his contract as an advisor to the IDP, it was reported that he had been helping Beto O'Rourke organize a series of trips to Iowa, and to help build O'Rourke's potential 2020 campaign staff in the state.
