= Miksa Esterházy =

Count Miksa Esterházy de Galántha
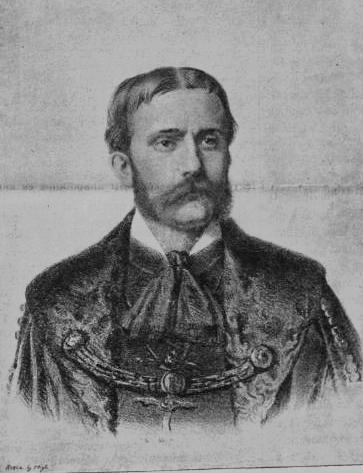
- Born: 14 May 1837; Vienna, Kingdom of Hungary, Austrian Empire
- Died: 5 August 1883 (aged 46); Tata, Kingdom of Hungary, Austria-Hungary
- Resting place: Esterházy Mausoleum; Ganna, Hungary; 47°13.951′N 17°31.833′E
- Occupation(s): diplomat, sports executive
- Known for: founding the first sports association in Hungary
- Spouse: Sarah Virginia ("Sally") Carroll

Count Miksa Esterházy de Galántha (Hungarian pronunciation: [ˈmikʃɒ ˈɛstɛrhaːzi]; 14 May 1837 – 5 August 1883) was a Hungarian landowner, diplomat and the founder of Magyar AC, the first sports association in Hungary.

== Biography ==
=== Early and personal life ===
He was born on 14 May 1837 in Vienna to Count Miklós Esterházy de Galántha and Countess Mária von Plettenberg-Mietingen. As an attaché, he spent longer time in London and Paris, and also served at the Austrian embassy in Berlin and later in Washington, where he met and later married to Sarah Virginia ("Sally") Carroll, widow of American General Charles Griffin. The marriage remained childless.

=== Creation of Hungarian athletics ===
During his stay abroad, Esterházy met with modern Anglo-Saxon outdoor sports and soon became an enthusiastic supporter of athletics and boxing. An active athlete himself, he began to promote these sports after his return to Hungary in the 1870s. Although his initiations encountered opposition at first, he eventually won the support of the Hungarian aristocracy and in 1875 he founded Magyar AC (Magyar Athletics Club, MAC), the first sports association in Hungary. Esterházy held the presidential position of MAC until his death.

The club took the English competition rules and organized its first athletics championships, which also featured a boxing event, on 6 May 1875. The championship was covered in the German and English press, highlighting its pioneer role. After the event, Esterházy issued a pamphlet titled Útmutató (Guide), which was the basis for sports clubs created in the coming years. Under the pseudonym Viator he published further two books, Gyaloglási Kalauz (Walking Guide; 1875) and Útmutató athletikai clubok alakítására (Instructions to establish athletics clubs; 1876).

=== Death and legacy ===
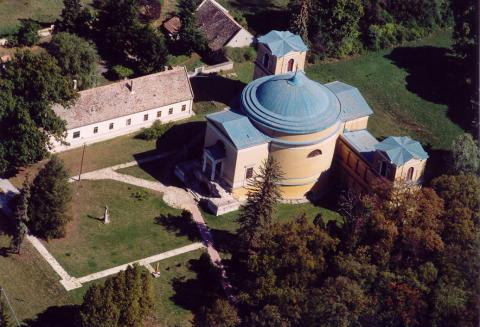
Esterházy Mausoleum in Ganna, Hungary

He died on 5 August 1883 in Tata and was buried at the family mausoleum of the Esterházys in Ganna, Hungary. In honour of his work and life, the Miksa Esterházy Memorial Medal – today known as the Miksa Esterházy Award – is given since 1992 to Hungarian individuals "in recognition of the outstanding work over a long period of time in promoting sports and developing the physical and moral condition of the population". In 2000 the Hungarian government declared 6 May – the day when the first athletics championships in the country took place – the Day of Hungarian Sports. The Miksa Esterházy Award, together with other sports prizes are handed on this occasion.
