= Bernie Sanders' Dank Meme Stash =

Facebook group supporting US Senator Bernie Sanders

- The Facebook group on March 24, 2016
- Website type: Facebook group
- Available in: English
- Creator: Will Dowd
- Commercial: No
- Launched: October 2015

Bernie Sanders' Dank Meme Stash is a Facebook group where members previously shared and discussed Internet memes relating to American politician and United States senator from Vermont, Bernie Sanders. Sanders was a candidate for the Democratic nomination for President of the United States in the 2016 U.S. presidential election, as well as the 2020 U.S. presidential election. This page is still active on Facebook with over 273,000 followers as of 2023.

== History ==
The group was created in early October 2015 by college student Will Dowd and author Sean Walsh with the purpose of supporting the 2016 Bernie Sanders presidential campaign.

On April 25, 2016, the group was temporarily affected by a 2016 Bernie Sanders Facebook groups suspension. SpinMedia's website Death and Taxes's Jamie Peck said that "I myself can report that porn is still popping up in popular FB group Bernie Sanders' Dank Meme Stash, and its members are not amused." Seattle's alternative newspaper The Stranger's Matt Baume said, "the group Bernie Sanders' Dank Meme Stash is still up and running."

On July 12, 2016, Sanders formally conceded the nomination and endorsed Hillary Clinton. The community was divided on the endorsement.

As of May 8, 2018, the group had a member count of about 417,147. As of May 8, 2018, the group shed most of its team, leaving only 15 admins / moderators. The Facebook page has over 50,000 likes.

As of October 18, 2019, with Bernie Sanders running for president in 2020, the group had about 394,448 members.

In June 2020, admins renamed the group to "So You Decided To Fuck Around" and stated, "The stash has progressed beyond the need for Bernie Sanders."

As of November 2020, the group is inaccessible on Facebook due to its popularity.

== Content ==
The group's content is user-submitted. Members create posts as commentary for Sanders and his presidential campaign. Many posts edit the politician into popular culture, such as rap album covers, or into Internet memes. Memes include image macros. While predominantly based on Facebook, content from the group is also shared on Reddit, Tumblr, and Twitter. Voting selfies are also uploaded.

The group's moderators aim for positive commentary on Sanders. Their goal with these memes is to make people think of Bernie as comedic. Memes that are sexist, racist, or ad hominem attacks against other candidates are not approved, but were generally ignored, especially sexist memes against Hillary Clinton. Dowd said little coordination went into the creation of memes.

In 2016, the group popularized the hugely popular meme "Bernie or Hillary?" that pitted Clinton and Sanders as opponents, as well as the "Ted Cruz–Zodiac meme".

On February 10, 2016, another meme, this one an email originally sent to Clinton supporters during the New Hampshire primary, was also popularized via the group. One of the supporters was Maddi Epping, a slam poet from Des Moines, Iowa. The email contained the subject line "I'm not kidding, Maddi". Epping posted a screenshot to the group. The meme became a trending topic on social media platforms and was referenced in several news outlets.

== Reactions ==
=== Reception ===
Vice's Carles Buzz said the group's memes "transcend the traditional media coverage ... The memes are explanatory, deconstructive, self-aware, and incendiary." American electro house musician Steve Aoki called the group "eternally entertaining". Oberlin College student newspaper The Oberlin Review's Josh Ashkinaze called the group "an odd page because political memes usually take a critical stance towards their subject." Yahoo Politics's Alyssa Bereznak called the group the second most popular of the eighteen large groups dedicated to him. Inverse's Jack Crosbie described it as "one online community [that] had emerged as the premier destination for the dankest political memes." Indiana University of Pennsylvania student newspaper The Penn's Jason Daquelente called BSDMS "[o]ne public group that has received a lot of hype." Pacific Standard's Wilson Dizard says the BSDMS membership "revel in Internet language and inside jokes that don't appear on an equivalent Clinton page."

Thought Catalog's Jacob Geers said the group "didn't look like anything I'd ever seen before" and that its memes were "truly hilarious." Fortune's Ryan Holmes called the group "ready-made to go viral", and described its memes as "hilarious, if incongruent". New York's Hudson Hongo said the Bernie Sanders meme community is "just one, small, only slightly connected part of a more expansive, and much weirder, segment of Facebook." The Daily Telegraph's Helena Horton called the group "comedic". The Tab's Roisin Lanigan said "[it's] quite a weird place to begin with". Daily Kos's Nerdstrom said the group would help win Sanders the 2016 United States presidential election. Business Insider's Dan Turkel described it as "bizarre".

=== Art ===
On February 12, 2016, new media artist Matt Starr organized the art exhibition "Weekend with Bernie" for Wayfarers Gallery in Bushwick, Brooklyn, New York. The exhibition included Ryder Ripps's installation "Faces of Bernie Sanders Dank Meme Stash" featuring Skype video chats with members of the group as well as a painting of American rapper Lil B as Sanders by Canadian record producer Ryan Hemsworth. The exhibition raised over $10,000 in donations to the Sanders campaign. Though the "Weekend with Bernie" art exhibition isn't the only organized meme art for Bernie Sanders. Surface area goes in-depth about an image of Bernie Sanders sitting in a chair with his legs crossed wearing a mask. The image became an overnight sensation when many users of social media converted this image into a meme.

=== Spin-offs ===
A spin-off dating group, Bernie Sanders Dank Meme Singles, was founded by a Beth Hannah of Havre, Montana. Members post either Internet memes, personal advertisements, or selfies. On February 22, 2016, the group had over 9,900 members and a team of 20 administrators.

Bernie Sanders Dank Meme Singles, in turn, inspired the online dating service Bernie Singles, founded on February 17, 2016, by Arizona State University student Colten Caudle and co-owner David Boni. It received 1,000 registered users within the first hour. The website allows users to search for other users based on geographic region.

Bernie Sanders' Dank Meme Stash inspired the Facebook page Ted Cruz Meme Page dedicated to the United States Senator from Texas Ted Cruz and his former presidential campaign. Other figures with dedicated pages include former 2016 presidential candidates Gary Johnson and Jill Stein.

Splinter groups like "I Got Banned From Bernie Sanders' Dank Meme Stash" also have thousands of members.

"Faces of Bernie Sanders Dank Meme Stash" (2016) by conceptual artist Ryder Ripps featuring the "Bernie or Hillary?" meme

=== Impact ===
Many publications speculated on whether Internet memes helped Bernie Sanders' presidential campaign. All signs pointed to this helping Bernie Sanders. It helped him gain attention, which he didn't receive a lot of with Hilary as the primary Democratic candidate. Bernie was tagged "the lord of dank memes". This was a positive for Bernie, as this allowed him to appeal to the younger generation. The Facebook group was widely followed by "a staggering 300,000 supporters. The memes helped Americans see Sanders as "down to earth". Though this did not lead to a nomination for Bernie, it elevated his public image. Former moderator of the group Sean Walsh said, "This generation's memes are that generation's C-SPAN or Huffington Post. Seriously, memes are going to be very prevalent in politics. They're going to get ideas into your head." The Washington Post's Caitlin Dewey believed memes are more participatory than news articles or official campaign letters besides addressing voter apathy through humor. Vice's Carles Buzz found memes curated by the group appealed more to a progressive base than the Facebook pages for local radio station. While examining the popularity of both Sanders and British politician Jeremy Corbyn, Jacobin's Peter Frase used the group as an example that "exploits the incongruity of these men's nebbishy affect when contrasted with their youthful supporters." Fortune's Ryan Holmes found it interesting that the memes had "little – or nothing – to do with Sanders' actual campaign." The Daily Kos's Nerdstrom thought an online community like the group was what rival presidential candidates lacked. In Northwestern University's news magazine North by Northwestern, Facebook page Cats for Kasich founder Blake Kolesa and co-founder Noah Orner called it "one of the many pop-culture phenomena that connect younger voters to politics." Business Insider's Dan Turkel pointed out how the group highlighted enthusiasm among young Internet users. The Daily Dot's Vic Vaiana said the group was one of the first leftist meme spaces to attract significant media coverage as well as increasing the popularity of similar spaces. Brit + Co's Tannara Yelland found Sanders' Internet appeal via memes resonated with Millennials.

== See also ==
- Bernie Bros
- r/The_Donald
- Social media in the 2016 U.S. Presidential campaign
- New Urbanist Memes for Transit-Oriented Teens
