= Social media in the 2016 United States presidential election =

Social media played an important role in shaping the course of events surrounding the 2016 United States presidential election, serving as a source of information for voters and a campaigning tool for candidates. The growth of social media since the previous presidential election led to changes in its use, with candidates adopted differing strategies to use the technology to their advantage. Republican nominee Donald Trump pursued a personal and informal communication style, commenting on other candidates, ongoing events, and news coverage of himself. In contrast, Democratic nominee Hillary Clinton adopted a more curated approach, keeping to her party's established strategy of using social media as a platform for centralized campaign messaging.

User-generated memes and viral moments of candidates were widely spread on social media. The ability for anyone to create, comment on, and share content on social media facilitated greater voter interaction with the political climate, providing new opportunities for the fundraising and discussion of candidates.

Following the election, disclosures of personal data misuse by Facebook and political consulting firm Cambridge Analytica were reported on by The Guardian and The New York Times. In response, Facebook's CEO Mark Zuckerberg testified in front of Congress, and Facebook was fined $5 billion by the Federal Trade Commission for privacy violations. A separate investigation into the Russian interference in the election was also conducted, concluding with an observation that Russian intelligence agencies had created fake accounts and spread misinformation on multiple social media sites in order to influence the election in favor of Trump.

== Background ==
Presidential elections are held every four years in the United States. Candidates may choose to run for the nomination of a political party, for which they compete in primaries and caucuses before the general election. Throughout the primary and general elections, candidates campaign nationally, making holding events and purchasing television and radio advertisements to try to communicate their views.

Since the 2000s, presidential candidates have been increasingly focusing on campaigning online as well. Barack Obama's successful 2008 campaign is acknowledged to have been the first to take advantage of social media as a tool to reach voters. He continued to use it in his 2012 re-election campaign, cultivating a much greater online presence than his opponent Mitt Romney; following Romney's defeat, the Republican National Committee accepted that the Obama campaign "had the clear edge" online.

Social media grew significantly between 2012 and 2016. The number of daily active Facebook users doubled globally, and the number of monthly active Twitter users worldwide doubled as well. The growth of social media led to media commentary about its potential uses in 2016: The Wall Street Journal predicted that the use of targeted campaign advertisements using newly available data would be among the more notable innovations, and The Hill wrote that "social media's influence in [the 2016] presidential election is stronger than it has ever been," and it "will shape campaigns for years to come."

== Voters ==
For voters, social media was a major source of information on the election. A January 2016 study conducted by the Pew Research Center found that 44% of respondents had learned something about the election from social media in the previous week, and that 14% of respondents found it to be the most helpful type of source for election news.

The Guardian compared Internet memes to political cartoons, arguing, "For the first time in a US election cycle, community-generated memes have grown to play a significant role in political discourse, similar to the classic printed cartoon. While an Internet meme is unlikely to destroy a political career, many memes targeting a candidate might".

Social media also served as an outlet for misinformation. Throughout the election, Russian government-affiliated agencies made use of multiple social media accounts and platforms to try to influence the electorate, targeting their activity against Democratic nominee Hillary Clinton. Facebook estimated that posts and advertisements from Russian actors reached over 126 million voters—over half of Facebook's American user base. 29 million people were reported to have seen the original posts, but comments, likes, and shares helped the misinformation reach a further 97 million people. The impact of this misinformation on the election outcome is debated.

== Major party nominees ==
=== Donald Trump campaign ===
Donald Trump's official White House portrait (taken 2017)

The Trump campaign made extensive use of social media platforms, notably Twitter, to reach voters. Trump had been politically active on Twitter prior to his presidential campaign, commenting on Barack Obama's presidency and spreading conspiracy theories about Obama's place of birth. He continued to use social media to share his opinions on various topics during his campaign in a personal style, unlike his opponent Hillary Clinton, who maintained a more curated image. Slate described his strategy as "retain[ing] his vulgar vigor and translated it into the political arena", and the Washington Post noted his ability to "use it in a way that truly shapes — not just amplifies — his message". Trump was more active on Twitter than any other presidential candidate of the election cycle, and his unique use of the site led him to be labelled "a social media master", "a virtuoso of the tweet", "genius", and is credited with having changed the role of social media in political campaigning.

Unlike other candidates, Trump's Twitter and Facebook posts were often focused on engaging with the public and news media, rather than his campaign website. In turn, public engagement with his posts was often much higher than with his opponents'. After winning the election, Trump would credit social media with helping him in his victory, despite his opponents spending "much more money than [he] spent". His campaign was able to leverage his social media presence to spread his message, particularly on Twitter, where his posts would often be "retweeted" among his supporters—much more frequently than for other candidates—and this virality was credited with reducing his advertising expenditures. Trump would continued to post on Twitter during and after his presidency, excluding a 22-month period from 2021 to 2022 during which his account was suspended. (Note: Trump's personal Twitter account was suspended from January 9, 2021 "due to the risk of further incitement of violence" in the wake of the January 6 United States Capitol attack. Following the acquisition of Twitter by Elon Musk, his account was reinstated on November 20, 2022.)

Trump was also noted for his unusually frequent criticism of worse-performing primary candidates. Before being named as the official party candidate at the 2016 Republican National Convention, many of his tweets directly attacked his fellow Republican candidates when their poll numbers would rise; after a second-place finish in the Iowa caucuses, he accused winner Ted Cruz of "stealing" victory, "lying on so many levels", and called for him to be "immediately disqualified in Iowa". In the first Republican presidential debate, held on August 6, 2015, the moderator asked candidate Jeb Bush if he stood by a statement made the previous April that illegal entry into the U.S. by undocumented migrants is "an act of love", to which Bush replied that he did. Almost immediately thereafter, the Trump campaign posted his comment as part of a video showing mugshots of illegal immigrants who committed violent crimes in the US, intercut with footage of Bush using the phrase.

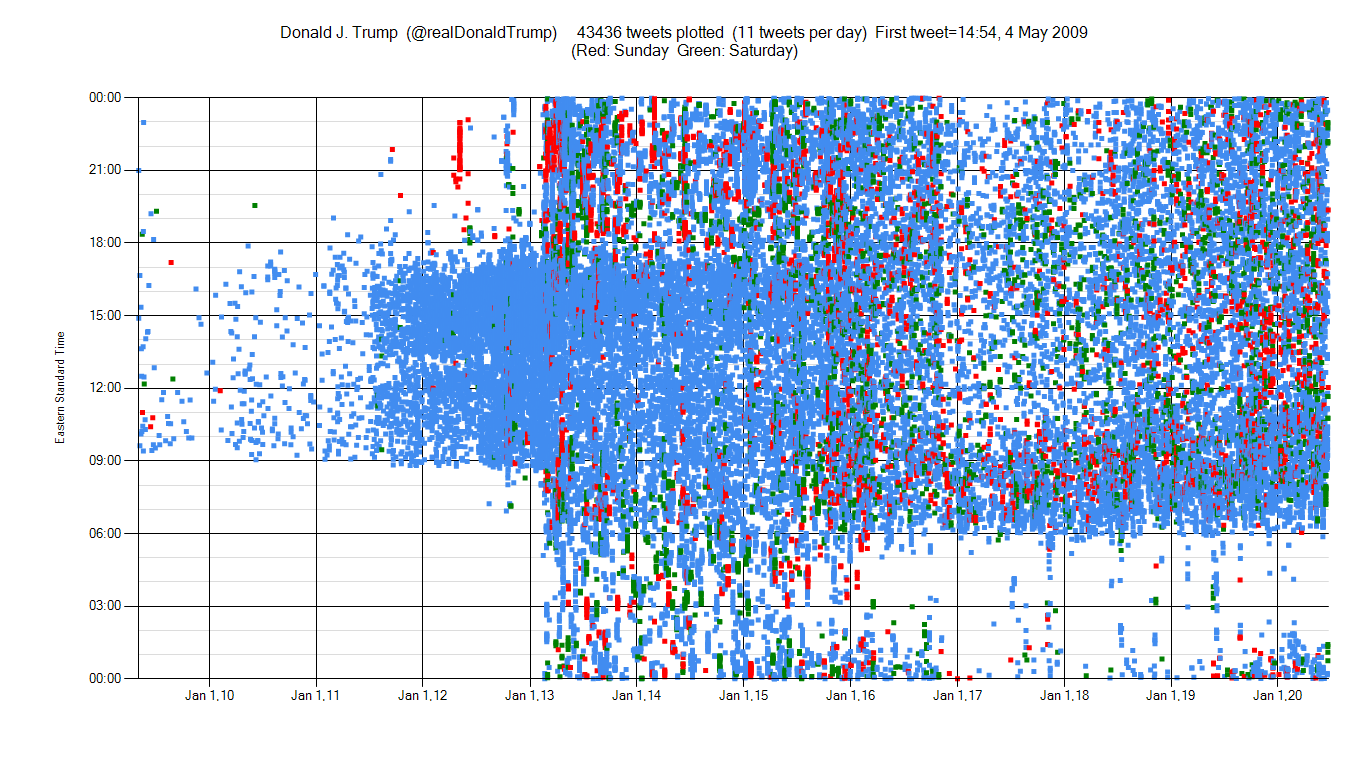
Donald Trump's tweet activity from his first tweet in May 2009. His tweet activity pattern has changed from 2013.

The Trump campaign saw greater organized social media activity on from their supporters from the beginning of the election period than other campaigns. Supporters of Donald Trump and opponents of Hillary Clinton conducted unofficial internet campaigns between June 2015 and November 2016: some users of social media, especially Reddit and 4chan, organized and participated in numerous "operations" to sway public opinion using Internet memes, Internet posts and online media. The internet conflict that arose from this campaign has been dubbed by some as "The Great Meme War".

On Reddit, r/The_Donald was a pro-Trump forum (termed a "subreddit") that consistently ranked as among the most active on the site. Due to the highly active community and the algorithm used to dictate what content reached the "r/all" front page of the website, a significant portion of the r/all page was content from r/The_Donald. In response, Reddit made changes to its algorithms on June 15 in an attempt to preserve the variety of r/all. On July 27, 2016, Trump participated in an Ask Me Anything (AMA) on r/The_Donald, answering thirteen questions from his supporters. The subreddit would later be shut down by Reddit in 2020 for repeated breaches of site policy.

=== Hillary Clinton campaign ===
Hillary Clinton in 2016

The Clinton campaign reused established social media strategies from previous Democratic Party campaigns, pursuing a more curated image on social media, in contrast to Trump's personal style. While the Trump campaign frequently posted content linked to news media, Clinton's posts more often included links to her website or campaign pages, and less personal commentary, with greater emphasis on campaign messaging.

Clinton occasionally deviated from her strategy of professionalism, often to provide a more informal response to other candidates. In August 2015, Jeb Bush altered one of Clinton's Twitter graphics about student debt to criticize the debt increase under the Obama administration. Clinton responded by crossing out the words on Bush's altered graphic and stating "F: The grade to Florida for college affordability under Jeb Bush's leadership." with the caption "@JebBush Fixed it for you." She responded to Donald Trump's June 2016 tweet commenting on Obama's endorsement of her with a three-word tweet: "Delete your account"; it became her account's most retweeted post.

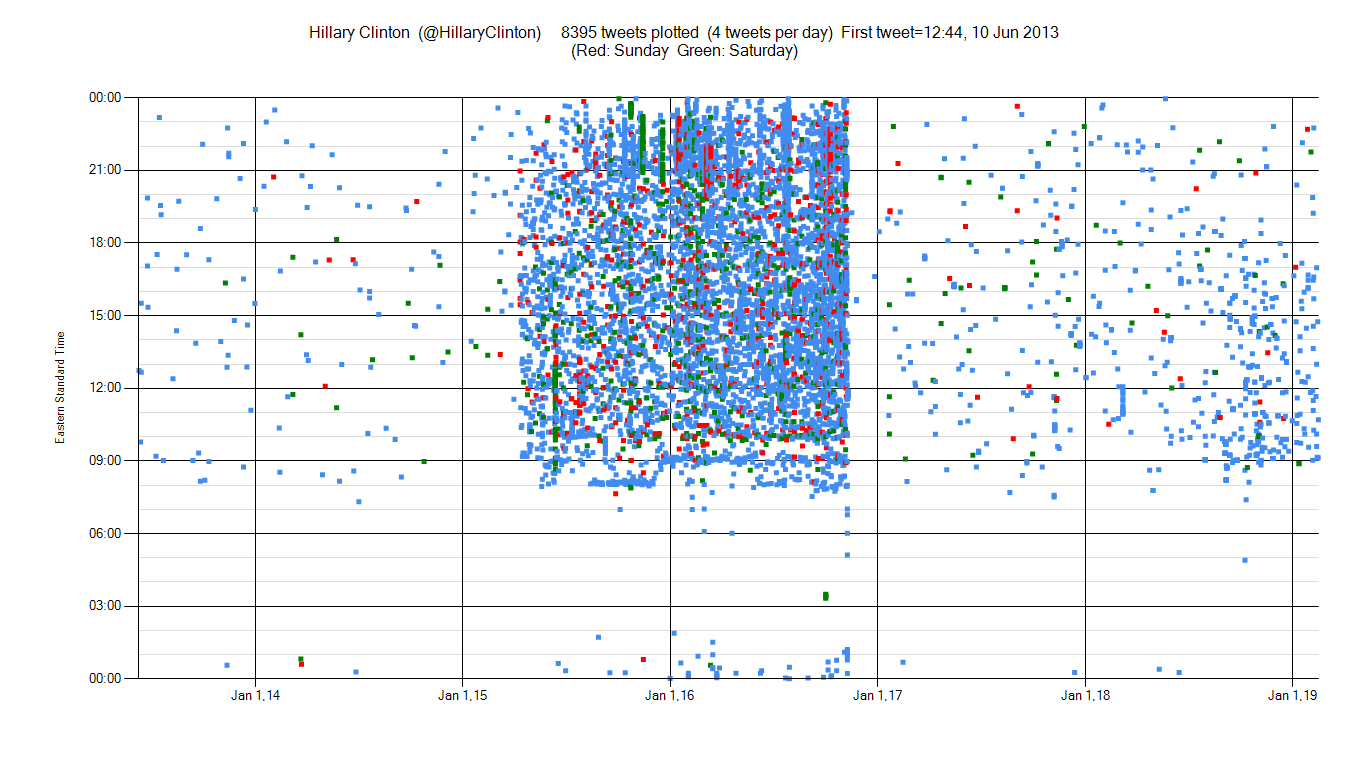
Twitter activity of Hillary Clinton from her first tweet in June 2013 to September 2017. Her tweet activity increased in 2015.

In April 2016, Correct the Record, a pro-Clinton super PAC, announced a program called "Barrier Breakers" intended to rival the largely online volunteer efforts of Sanders and Trump supporters. With $1 million in funding, Correct the Record employed paid staff described as "former reporters, bloggers, public affairs specialists, designers" to respond to negative content about Clinton. This was interpreted as a response to perceived lower levels of enthusiasm for Clinton campaign's on social media platforms, as Trump often received greater public engagement with his activity than she did, despite him having a less active audience on social media.

Clinton also had multiple viral moments during her campaign. After the Democratic National Convention, she began campaigning with running mate, Tim Kaine, and stated while on the campaign trail with him, "I don't know who created Pokémon Go [...] I try to get them to have Pokémon Go to the polls". Additionally, one of her videos on Snapchat, where she proclaimed that she was, "Just chillin', in Cedar Rapids", quickly became a meme on video-sharing app Vine, gaining over 17 million plays in a month.

== Other campaigns ==
=== Bernie Sanders campaign ===
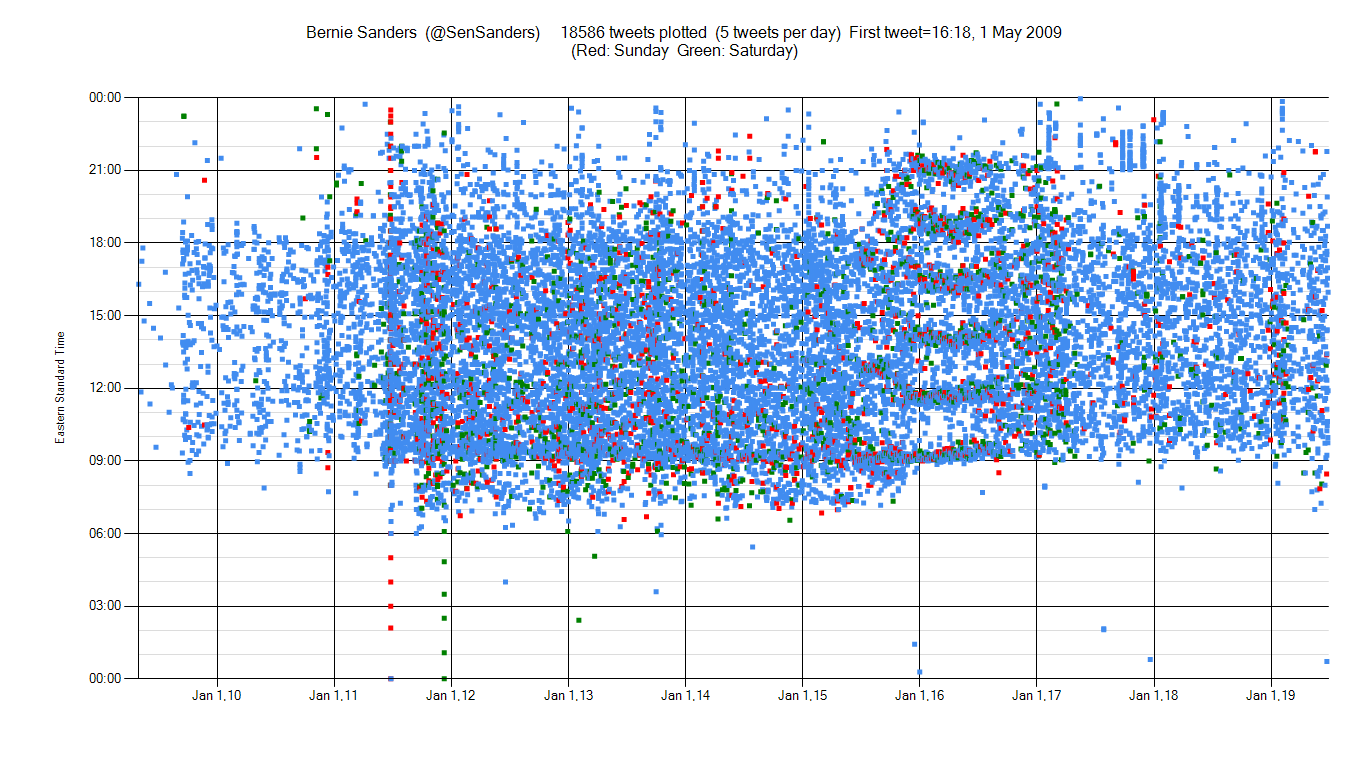
Twitter activity of Bernie Sanders from his first tweet in May 2009. His Twitter activity increased during his presidential campaign.

Social media played a significant role in the Bernie Sanders 2016 presidential campaign. The campaign adopted a strategy of fundraising online—of the $230 million raised, $216 million was raised online, with the campaign only holding nine in-person fundraisers. Sanders' campaign also saw greater public engagement online than Clinton's despite her stronger position in the race, a fact that has been attributed to Sanders' popularity among younger demographics.

Supporters of Sanders' campaign engaged in multiple organized online activities during the election. In March 2016, a group of Sanders supporters succeeded in closing down a planned Trump rally in Chicago, organizing their efforts through Facebook. As of May 2016, 450,000 people belonged to the Facebook group Bernie Sanders' Dank Meme Stash, a page primarily devoted to praising Sanders whilst pointing out flaws in rival candidates Ted Cruz, Donald Trump, and Hillary Clinton in comical ways. Sanders was also the subject of multiple memes, including "Bernie or Hillary?", a meme in which Internet users who favored Sanders over Clinton compared the two candidates in faux political posters, with Sanders being portrayed as over-enthusiastic and Clinton being shown as more clueless.

Sanders' campaign was able to convert certain viral moments into fundraising opportunities. In one instance, a bird landed on a podium while Sanders was speaking, with footage of the bird going viral; in response, the campaign used the event in fundraising advertisements, raising over $3.6 million in the days following.

=== Jeb Bush campaign ===
Jeb Bush announced he was exploring a presidential run through a Facebook post in December 2014, and his formal campaign launch was posted on Snapchat, in an attempt to gain the attention of younger voters. The Bush campaign suffered from low social media engagement overall, with Bush's tweets seldom surpassing 100 retweets; however, he was the subject of some viral moments. In once instance, Bush posted a picture of a handgun with the caption "America" on Twitter, which garnered over 40,000 retweets. He was widely ridiculed for the post, with criticism focusing of the rate of gun violence in the United States.

After it was reported that Hillary Clinton used a private email server for government matters during her tenure as Secretary of State, Bush published tens of thousands of his own emails and used Twitter to pressure Clinton to do the same. Separately, in August 2015, he tweeted a graphic from the Clinton campaign which was edited to highlight the recent increases in student debt under the Obama administration. Clinton would later respond by editing Bush's version to criticize Florida's college affordability under his tenure as governor.

=== Ted Cruz campaign ===
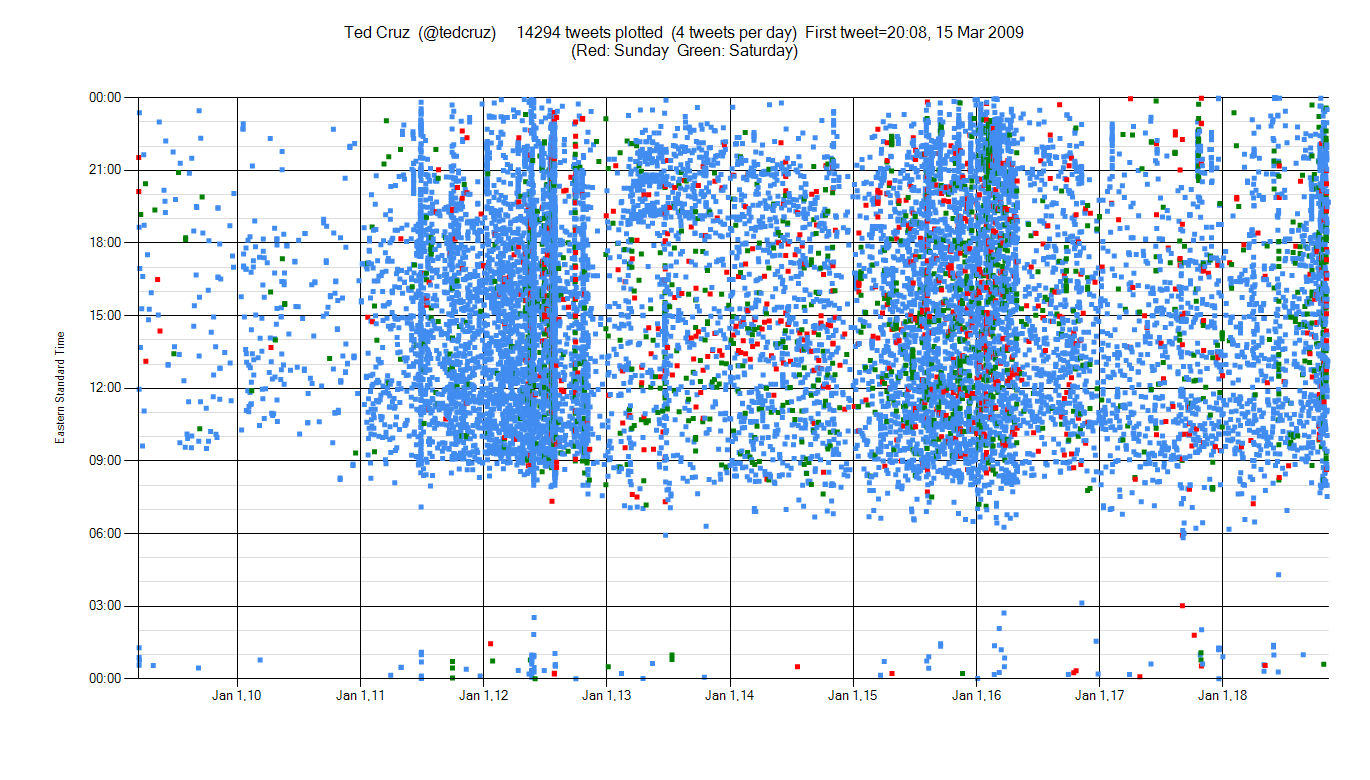
Twitter activity of Ted Cruz

According to The Guardian, Ted Cruz was "skewered by social media memes". His run for the presidency was affected by a series of viral moments, including a video of a failed attempt to shake hands with his running mate Carly Fiorina, and a mock-conspiracy theory asserting that Cruz was the Zodiac Killer, an unidentified serial killer active in northern California from the late 1960s to the early 1970s, largely before Cruz was even born. While the proponents of the meme generally did not think Cruz was the Zodiac Killer, in the lead up to the primary elections a Public Policy Polling poll of Florida Republican voters showed that 38% of respondents were either unsure or believed that Cruz was the killer. Cruz himself would later jokingly allude to the meme, replying "uh oh" to a December 2020 tweet announcing that a cypher left by the killer had been cracked.

== Post-election investigations ==
After the elections, two separate investigations were opened into social media-related activities: one into the misuse of personal data by political consulting firm Cambridge Analytica, and another into Russian attempts to influence voters online.

=== Facebook-Cambridge Analytica data scandal ===
In March 2018, former Cambridge Analytica employee Christopher Wylie revealed to the press that during the 2016 election, the company harvested the personal information of Facebook users without their consent, in breach of the platform's data policies. Facebook estimated the initial number of users affected to be 50 million, a figure that was later revised to a "maximum" of 87 million. Only approximately 270,000 of the affected had consented to having their data accessed, which was done through an app originally developed for academia. The information collected was subsequently used to build data profiles on users, which were then used for targeted political advertising by the Donald Trump and Ted Cruz campaigns.

The scandal eventually resulted in Christopher Wylie and Facebook CEO Mark Zuckerberg testifying in front of the United States Congress, the liquidation of Cambridge Analytica, and a $5 billion fine for Facebook. It also provoked a wider global debate about the ethics surrounding data harvesting and privacy, especially in political contexts. In April 2018, Facebook announced new data privacy policy, with greater emphasis on user consent and preventing data misuse.

=== Investigation into Russian interference in the election ===
Throughout the 2016 election, the Internet Research Agency (IRA), a Russian online propaganda company with links to Vladimir Putin, attempted to influence the electoral outcome in favor of Donald Trump by creating large numbers of social media accounts to like, share and repost positive information on Trump and negative information on Clinton. Efforts were particularly directed at influencing black voters, in attempt to incite racial division and sow conflict. Social media propaganda was one of multiple methods employed by the IRA to influence the election.

In May 2017, a Special Counsel investigation was conducted by Robert Mueller, which ultimately concluded in its final report that the Russian government's activities on social media "violat[ed] U.S. criminal laws in order to interfere with U.S. elections and political processes."

== See also ==
- Social media and political communication in the United States
- Donald Trump on social media
- Mueller report
- Russian interference in the 2016 United States elections
- Ted Cruz–Zodiac meme
