= Bernie Bro =

Young male supporters of Bernie Sanders

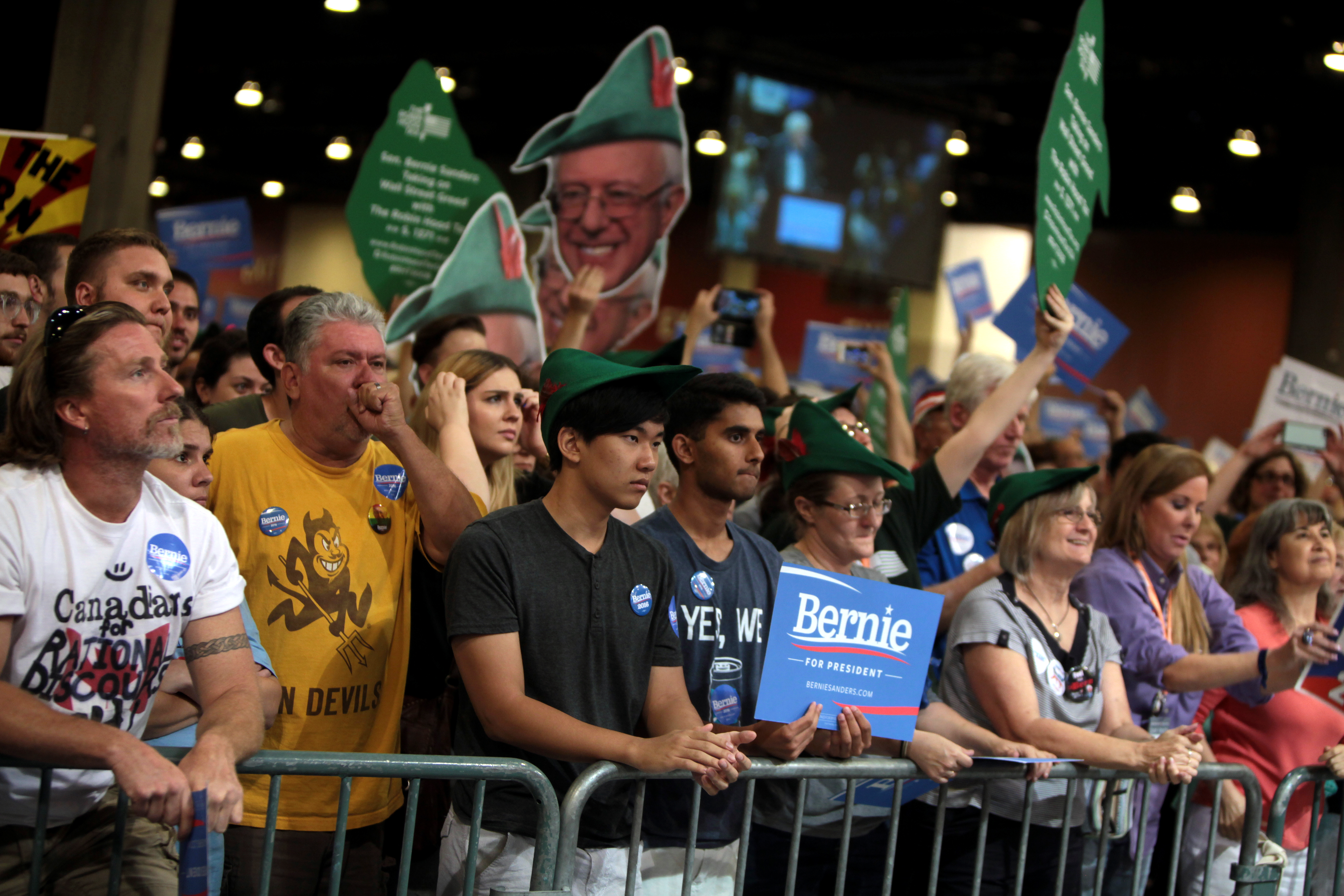
Bernie Sanders supporters at a town meeting in 2015.

Bernie Bro (sometimes spelled Berniebro), collectively Bernie Bros, is a term coined in 2015 by Robinson Meyer of The Atlantic as a pejorative to describe young male supporters of presidential candidate Bernie Sanders in the 2016 United States presidential election. The term remained in use for the 2020 United States presidential election.

== Origin ==
Robinson Meyer, a writer for The Atlantic, coined the term Bernie bro in an October 17, 2015 article to describe young, white, progressive men who, in his view, support unrealistic progressive policies and promote the Bernie Sanders campaign obnoxiously. According to Meyer, Bernie Bros belong to the middle class, are "aware of NPR podcasts and jangly bearded bands", and voted for Barack Obama in the 2012 United States presidential election.

== Reaction ==
=== Sanders campaign response ===
In February 2016, Sanders distanced himself from the group as a result of alleged sexist attacks against rival Democratic candidate Hillary Clinton. On CNN's State of the Union program, Jake Tapper asked whether he had heard "about this phenomenon, Bernie Bros, who support you and sometimes attack in very sexist ways". Sanders replied "I have heard about it. It's disgusting...Anybody who is supporting me and who is doing sexist things, we don't want them. I don't want them. That is not what this campaign is about."

In an interview with Thom Hartmann, state Senator Nina Turner (a campaign surrogate for Senator Bernie Sanders) criticized the use of the term: "I just think it is really hyped by the Clinton campaign. I mean, both candidates have people who really, really support them and sometimes in ways that are not nice. But it's the same thing, if people want to research this, it's the same thing that the Clinton campaign did to President, then Senator, Obama. I think they were called 'Obama Boys.' So it's really the same stuff recycled that there are a group of men out there that are rabid and they're sexist and they're really against Secretary Clinton." Max van Dyke made a similar point in 2017.

During the ninth 2020 Democratic debate, Sanders suggested that Russians were impersonating people claiming to be his supporters online. A Twitter spokesperson rejected this suggestion, telling CNBC: "Using technology and human review in concert, we proactively monitor Twitter to identify attempts at platform manipulation and mitigate them. As is standard, if we have reasonable evidence of state-backed information operations, we’ll disclose them following our thorough investigation to our public archive — the largest of its kind in the industry."

=== Other criticism ===
Zeeshan Aleem, a Columnist at MSNBC, argued in August 2021 that the "myth of the white Bernie Bro has quietly vanished". This was because the recent electoral success of a diverse group of Progressives effectively buried the idea of a white and male leftwing movement. Most notably, the Congressional group The Squad, several of whose members claim the same mantle of Democratic socialism that Sanders popularized in his campaigns, and which represents the most leftwing bloc in the House, "is composed entirely by people of color and effectively led by women". Even "prominent friends of the squad", like Congressional Progressive Caucus leader Pramila Jayapal, and the freshman representative Mondaire Jones, "hail from diverse backgrounds."

According to Vice News, in September 2019, women under 45 comprised a larger share of Sanders' supporters than men of the same age group. After the 2020 Nevada caucus, The Washington Post stated that he was "forcing a sudden reckoning in the Democratic party" because of his strong support from Hispanic and Latino voters.

In January 2016, The Intercept journalist Glenn Greenwald called the Bernie Bro narrative a "cheap campaign tactic" and a "journalistic disgrace" and indicated that more women supported Sanders than Clinton: "one has to be willing to belittle the views and erase the existence of a huge number of American women to wield this 'Bernie Bro' smear." He also asserted a lack of evidence for the concept. He summarized his opinion as follows: "The goal is to inherently delegitimize all critics of Hillary Clinton by accusing them of, or at least associating them with, sexism, thus distracting attention away from Clinton's policy views, funding, and political history and directing it toward the online behavior of anonymous, random, isolated people on the internet claiming to be Sanders supporters."

Nathan Wellman asserted in US Uncut in January 2016 that users of the term "are essentially erasing the contributions of women and people of color to the Bernie Sanders campaign to propagate their own narrative, rendering them as invisible people. This is one of the oldest forms of violence perpetrated by white people of privilege."

== See also ==
- 2016 Democratic National Committee email leak
- Social media in the United States presidential election, 2016
- Bro culture
- Chapo Trap House
- Dirtbag left
