= Zodiac Killer suspects =

American serial killer suspects

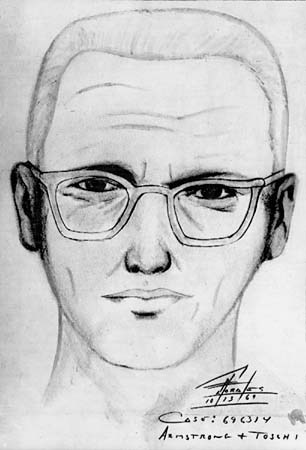
A composite sketch of the Zodiac Killer made in 1969

Thousands of men have been named as a possible suspect for the Zodiac Killer, an unidentified serial killer active between December 1968 and October 1969. The Zodiac murdered five known victims in the San Francisco Bay Area, operating in rural, urban, and suburban settings. His known victims were three young couples and a lone male cab driver, while he claimed in letters to have murdered thirty-seven people. The case has been described as "arguably the most famous unsolved murder case in American history", and has become a fixture of popular culture and focus for amateur detectives.

In 2012, The Guardian wrote that over 2,500 people have been brought up as a possible Zodiac suspect, and at least a half-dozen names were credible. The San Francisco Police Department (SFPD) had investigated an estimated 2,500 suspects by 2009. Richard Grinell, who runs the website Zodiac Ciphers, said in 2022 that "there are probably 50 or 100 suspects named every year".

While many theories regarding the identity of the Zodiac have been suggested, the only suspect authorities ever publicly named was Arthur Leigh Allen, a former elementary school teacher and convicted sex offender who died in 1992. No one was ever arrested for the crimes. Despite continued efforts into the 21st century, the killer's identity is unknown.

== Background ==
The Zodiac Killer claimed in messages to newspapers to have committed thirty-seven murders. Investigators agree on seven confirmed assault victims, all in Northern California, of whom five died and two survived:

- David Arthur Faraday and Betty Lou Jensen were shot and killed on December 20, 1968, on Lake Herman Road in Benicia.
- Michael Renault Mageau and Darlene Elizabeth Ferrin were shot around midnight between July 4 and 5, 1969, in the parking lot of Blue Rock Springs Park in Vallejo. Mageau survived the attack; Ferrin was later pronounced dead.
- Bryan Calvin Hartnell and Cecelia Ann Shepard were stabbed on September 27, 1969, at Lake Berryessa in Napa County. Hartnell survived, but Shepard died as a result of her injuries on September 29.
- Paul Lee Stine was shot and killed on October 11, 1969, in the Presidio Heights neighborhood of San Francisco.

The Zodiac coined his name in a series of taunting messages that he mailed to regional newspapers, threatening killing sprees and bombings if they were not printed. He also said that he was collecting his victims as slaves for the afterlife. Some letters included cryptograms or ciphers; of the four codes he produced, two remain unsolved while the others were cracked in 1969 and 2020. The last confirmed Zodiac letter was sent in 1974, in which he claimed to have killed thirty-seven victims. He had said earlier that many of them were in Southern California, including Cheri Jo Bates, who was murdered in Riverside in 1966; a connection between the two has not been proven.

== Arthur Leigh Allen ==
Arthur Leigh Allen was a former elementary school teacher and convicted child molester. He remains the only publicly named suspect by the police. Several of his friends have claimed that he had called himself The Zodiac, that he liked to shoot young couples in lover's lanes, and that he had aspirations to write a book about a serial killer named The Zodiac. Additionally, the timing of his imprisonment aligns with the Zodiac's known correspondence with the police. By far the lead most pursued by the police, he was the subject of several searches but was never arrested. His fingerprints and handwriting could not be definitively linked to the Zodiac. He died in August 1992.

In the early 2000s, a partial DNA profile possibly belonging to the Zodiac was obtained and Allen's DNA did not match. True crime author Robert Graysmith wrote two books in 1986 and 2002, in which Allen's culpability was strongly suggested. Zodiac, a 2007 film based on Graysmith's books, portrayed Allen as the likely killer.

== Earl Van Best Jr. ==
In 2014, Gary Stewart and Susan Mustafa published a book, The Most-Dangerous Animal of All: Searching for My Father... And Finding the Zodiac Killer, in which Stewart claimed his search for his biological father, Earl Van Best Jr., led him to conclude Van Best was the Zodiac. Stewart based his hypothesis on circumstantial evidence, including a composite sketch resembling Van Best, partial fingerprint and handwriting matches, encrypted messages in Zodiac letters, and partial DNA connections.

In 2020, the book was adapted for FX Network as a documentary series. To validate Stewart's claims, the producers enlisted private investigator Zach Fechheimer, who uncovered that Stewart had manipulated a police report and traced Van Best to being present in Europe during the Zodiac's known activities. Additionally, experts discredited the DNA analysis and the handwriting and fingerprint matches. The producers chose to withhold their findings until near the end of the documentary's production to minimize their impact on both the series and Stewart. Six months after production, director Kief Davidson stated that he thought Stewart's father was not the Zodiac, while executive producer Ross Dinerstein remained uncertain about Van Best's potential involvement. Van Best died in 1984.

== Giuseppe Bevilacqua ==
In 2017, Italian journalist Francesco Amicone conducted an investigation that implicated Giuseppe "Joe" Bevilacqua, a retired U.S. Army sergeant and former superintendent of the Florence American Cemetery and Memorial, as a suspect in both the Zodiac and Monster of Florence (Il Mostro di Firenze) cases. Bevilacqua had previously testified at the trial of suspect Pietro Pacciani in 1994.

Starting in May 2017, Bevilacqua and Amicone began having multiple meetings; according to Amicone, Bevilacqua implied his responsibility for both cases in phone correspondence. Bevilacqua agreed with Amicone's request to turn himself in but later changed his mind. Citing professional ethics reasons, Amicone did not record the conversation. Amicone's inquiry was published in multiple Italian newspapers, and has been continued since then on his blog.

According to Amicone, the references to water in the letters written by the two serial killers are a ‘signature’ linked to the name of the perpetrator; based on his decipherment of the 13 characters in the ‘My name is’ cipher from the Zodiac letter dated 20 April 1970, this name is ‘Joe Bevilacqua’.

During the interviews in 2017, the Italian-American reportedly confided to Amicone that he had worked in the late 1960s and early 1970s for various detachments of the US Army’s Criminal Investigation branch (now the Criminal Investigation Division). In doing so, he reportedly mentioned the names of several colleagues, revealing that he had been in the San Francisco area during the Zodiac’s active period to carry out undercover investigative work. Bevilacqua reportedly told Amicone that he had taken part in the investigation into the ‘Khaki Mafia’ case, in which the US Army’s First Sergeant Major William O. Wooldridge was the main suspect.

The murder investigation into Bevilacqua by the Florence Public Prosecutor’s Office, which stemmed from Amicone’s inquiry, was dismissed in 2021 at the request of Florence’s Deputy Public Prosecutor Luca Turco. In February 2022, Amicone was notified that the preliminary investigations into the alleged defamation of Bevilacqua had been closed.

Joe Bevilacqua died on December 23, 2022. Italian authorities dismissed their investigation into Bevilacqua in 2021. Amicone claimed a DNA profile was sent to U.S. authorities investigating the Zodiac case in November 2023.

== Paul Doerr ==
Jarrett Kobek's 2022 book How to Find Zodiac named Paul Doerr, who died in 2007, as a suspect. Doerr was a North Bay resident with a post office box in Vallejo, where the first murders took place. Born in 1927, Doerr's age in 1969 (42) as well as his height (5'9") would have been consistent with witness estimates.

Doerr was an avid fanzine publisher and letter-writer throughout the 1960s and 1970s, and many of his writings exhibit circumstantial parallels with the Zodiac. Paul Haynes, a researcher for the true crime book I'll Be Gone in the Dark, called Doerr "the best Zodiac suspect that's ever surfaced." Doerr's daughter read Kobek's book with the intent of suing the author for libel, but came away impressed with his research, adding in interviews that her father had at times been violent and abusive. Kobek sent a nineteen-page document to the SFPD's Major Crimes Division regarding the similarities; he did not receive a response.

Doerr was a member of the Minutemen, a right-wing militant group that sent out threatening letters to supposed communists using a symbol that resembled the Zodiac's. Some of the Zodiac attacks took place at hangout spots of Doerr's daughter. In his fanzine Pioneer, Doerr references the same formula for an ANFO bomb later given by the Zodiac, which Kobek argues was not widely known before the Internet and the publication of The Anarchist Cookbook in 1971. Doerr hinted in a 1974 letter to the neopagan magazine Green Egg that he had previously killed people; Kobek writes that that part of the letter was not intended for publication, but Green Egg had a policy of publishing every letter in full.

Doerr was interested in cryptography; in issue #1 of his J. R. R. Tolkien fanzine Hobbitalia, he published a cipher in Cirth. This came three days after Zodiac sent the "Z13" cipher, and Kobek argues that the solution to the Hobbitalia cipher is one of only three possible solutions to Z13. In Hobbitalia #2, Doerr praised the Society for Creative Anachronism, a group of medieval cosplayers, which could explain the executioner-style costume used at Lake Berryessa. A Renaissance Faire took place nearby on the day of the attack, and there is an undated photo that shows Doerr carrying a knife similar to the one described in the Lake Berryessa attack. Doerr also made a list of books he wanted to sell, including E. Royston Pike's The Strange Ways of Man, which in one passage describes headhunters killing victims so they could have slaves in the afterlife. In a letter to a different fanzine in 1970, Doerr advocated using solely 1¢ stamps to spite the United States Postal Service, a practice the Zodiac employed on some of his letters.

== Richard Gaikowski ==
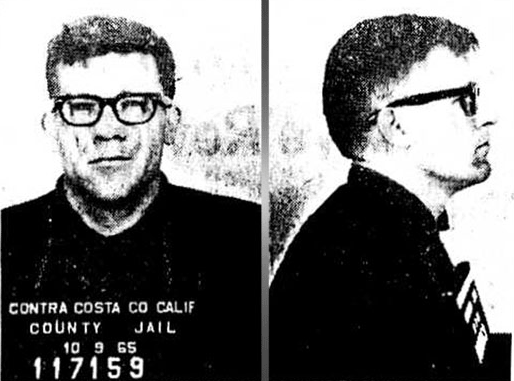
Gaikowski in a 1965 mugshot

In the 1980s, a former co-worker of Richard Gaikowski nicknamed "Goldcatcher" (also known as Blaine Blaine) wrote long letters to law enforcement accusing him of being the Zodiac Killer. Gaikowski was later investigated by Napa County detective Ken Narlow. He had told Narlow that he was not in the United States at the time of the Lake Herman Road murders, but was unable to prove this as he had lost his passport.

According to Zodiac researcher Tom Voigt, who has Gaikowski as his number one suspect, the FBI investigated Gaikowski but dismissed him as a suspect upon hearing the claim he had been out of the country, despite allegedly losing the passport. San Francisco and Napa police have declined to compare DNA samples of Gaikowski and the Zodiac.

Gaikowski had moved to the Bay Area in 1963. At the time of the Zodiac murders, he was a reporter and editor for the counterculture tabloids Good Times and the Martinez Morning News Gazette. Gaikowski's appearance resembled the Stine composite sketch, and the word "Gyke" also appears in the Zodiac cipher that claimed to contain his identity. When he was working for the Gazette, Gaikowski was minutes away from two Zodiac murder scenes.

Gaikowski was trained as a medic in the army, and the taxicab driver Paul Stine had a piece of his shirt torn off by the Zodiac; this was a common practice taught to medical personnel. Paul Stine's sister told Voigt she recognized Gaikowski at Stine's funeral. This would also match with the claim that Darlene Ferrin's attacker and boyfriend were named Richard. Wednesdays were the busiest day for the Good Times, and the Zodiac never mailed a communication on that day of the week. In 1971, Gaikowski was involuntarily committed to Napa State Mental Hospital and diagnosed with a mental illness, and the Zodiac stopped writing letters during this time; Gaikowski was released in late 1973. He later operated a movie theater, and died in 2004.

In 2009, an episode of the History Channel television series MysteryQuest investigated Gaikowski, and Goldcatcher made an appearance in disguise, along with Voigt. On the episode, Goldcatcher provided recordings of Gaikowski's voice. Nancy Slover, the Vallejo police dispatcher who was contacted by the Zodiac shortly after the Blue Rock Springs attack, identified a recording of Gaikowski's voice as being the same as the Zodiac's. However, the History Channel referred to Goldcatcher as a "conspiracy theorist with low credibility", and a San Francisco police dispatcher referred to him as "one of the top three Zodiac kooks."

== Lawrence Kane ==
Retired police detective Harvey Hines began investigating a man named Lawrence Kane (also spelled Lawrence Kaye) in the 1980s. When shown a photo lineup, Kathleen Johns had identified Kane as the man who abducted her in 1970. Darlene Ferrin's sister Linda identified a photo of Kane as the man she said had once harassed Ferrin in a restaurant. After also seeing a photo of Kane, Officer Don Fouke said that Kane resembled the man he and his partner Eric Zelms had observed near the Paul Stine murder scene more than any other person he had seen.

Kane had lived in South Lake Tahoe, California, and worked at the Sahara Tahoe casino when alleged victim Donna Lass worked there. Hines also believes that Kane was the abductor and killer of a woman named Dana Lull in Las Vegas, following her companion Roy Tophigh giving a description of a man that closely matched Kane. His fingerprints did not match the ones that were lifted from victim Paul Stine's cab and are believed to be the Zodiac's. He had previously been arrested for voyeurism in 1961 and prowling in 1968, and had been diagnosed with impulse-control disorder after suffering brain injuries in a 1962 accident. Kane died in 2010.

In 2021, Fayçal Ziraoui, a French-Moroccan business consultant and engineer, claimed that he had solved the Z13 and Z32 ciphers. According to Ziraoui, the Z13 cipher reads "Kayr", in theory a typo of "Kaye", and the Z32 cipher gives a set of coordinates: "LABOR DAY FIND 45.069 NORT 58.719 WEST." If the coordinate system used is "based on the earth's magnetic field [and] not the more familiar geographic coordinates", it gives the location of a school in South Lake Tahoe, lining up with the cipher's intention of being the location of a bomb in a school. Many Zodiac sleuths disputed Ziraoui's findings, while the FBI and SFPD declined to comment on his hypothesis. Anonymous law enforcement officers investigating the Zodiac told the San Francisco Chronicle they did not believe the solutions were correct.

== Richard Marshall ==
Ken Narlow, a Napa County detective, investigated Richard Marshall for many years. Marshall was a ham radio operator and movie projectionist who lived in Riverside at the time of the Bates murder and later in San Francisco close to the scene of the Stine murder. Visitors to his home found him "peculiar", and he often mentioned finding "something much more exciting than sex". Marshall liked the movie The Red Phantom, which is the phrase a possible Zodiac letter used. Marshall also lived in a basement apartment, which the Zodiac mentioned in a letter. Like the Zodiac, he owned felt tip pens and "odd-sized" paper, and the two used a similar typewriter and teletype.

In 1989, Marshall acknowledged that similarities existed but denied being the Zodiac. His fingerprints did not match the ones found in Paul Stine's cab that were believed that have been the Zodiac's. Narlow later said that "Marshall makes good reading but [is] not a very good suspect in my estimation". Marshall died in 2008.

== Gary Francis Poste ==
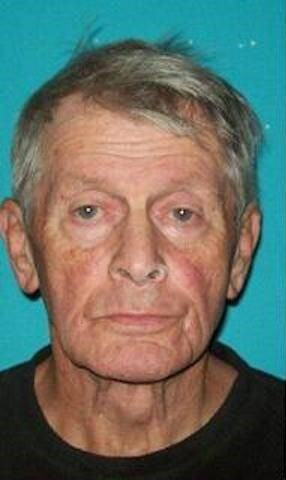
Poste in a 2016 mugshot

In 2021, the Case Breakers, an independent group made up of around forty "former law enforcement officials, academics, journalists, and former military intelligence workers", claimed they had identified Gary Francis Poste, a man who died in 2018, as both the Zodiac and the murderer of Cheri Jo Bates. The Federal Bureau of Investigation stated that the case remained open and that there were "no new information to report".

Local law enforcement expressed skepticism regarding the team's findings. Riverside investigator Ryan Railsback said the Case Breakers' claims largely relied on circumstantial evidence. Rumors about Poste as a suspect had been investigated by the SFPD in 2017. They visited his jail, but declined to say if they interviewed him. In 2023, the Case Breakers claimed an FBI whistleblower told them the bureau had considered Poste a suspect since 2016.

Poste was a veteran of the United States Air Force. While stationed at a base in early 1959, he and a fellow airman were involved in a serious car accident that killed his friend and severely injured Poste. He had a history of violence; he pushed his wife into a wall, breaking her pelvis, and a male relative claimed Poste tried to attack him with a hammer. Poste allegedly had a group of young male followers whom he trained to be "killing machines", and who often attacked animals. Thomas J. Colbert, leader of the Case Breakers, said that Poste taught members of his alleged group how to turn a pipe bomb into a bomb that could "blow up houses."

One piece of evidence used by the Case Breakers involved forehead scars that were supposedly present on both Poste and the Zodiac. Zodiac researcher Tom Voigt called the claims "bullshit", noting that no witnesses in the case described the Zodiac as having forehead scars. The Case Breakers also said that the Zodiac and Poste had the same shoe size, and claimed that DNA from the Bates murder would match Poste's.

Poste had been investigated as a suspect in the Zodiac case since at least 2014 by television news anchor Dale Julin. Julin filed affidavits in court that stated he interviewed Poste in 2017, and Poste admitted to being the Zodiac. The Union Democrat newspaper found the information in the affidavits to be unverifiable. Julin also claimed he used supposed anagrams found in the Zodiac's letters to find a tree where Poste, as the Zodiac, hanged alleged victim Donna Lass. Julin's solution for the codes contained Poste's name and gave the coordinates of a specific pine tree in a section of a campground in Zephyr Cove, Nevada. The tree in question had been gouged at the base. The Case Breakers partially based their research on Julin's book on the subject, Catching Zodiac, which was released in 2024.

== Ross Sullivan ==
Ross Sullivan became a person of interest through the possible link between the Zodiac and the murder of Cheri Jo Bates. Sullivan, a library assistant at Riverside City College, was suspected by co-workers after he engaged in disturbing behavior and went missing for several days following the murder. Sullivan resembled sketches of the Zodiac, as he sported a crew cut and wore glasses and military-style boots with footprints like those found at the Lake Berryessa murder scene. Police were apparently able to verify that Sullivan had an alibi for the time of the Bates murder. Sullivan had moved to Northern California in 1967 and was hospitalized multiple times with bipolar disorder and schizophrenia. He died in 1977.

== Alternative suspects ==
- Following the capture of Charles Manson and his murderous cult, the Manson Family, a 1970 report by the California Bureau of Criminal Identification and Investigation stated that all male members of the group had been investigated and eliminated as Zodiac suspects. There have been attempts to link the two Santa Barbara County shootings with the Manson Family due to their ties to the city of Santa Barbara, but there has so far been no evidence of a connection.
- Richard Hoffman, a police officer who responded to the Blue Rocks Springs attack scene, was accused by his grandson in 2024 of being the Zodiac Killer with "proofs" that he showed on TikTok.
- Jim Mordecai was suspected to be the Zodiac Killer and the man behind the Santa Rosa hitchhiker murders by members of his family, including his granddaughter.
- Dennis Kaufman received extensive publicity claiming that his late stepfather, Jack Tarrance, was the Zodiac. Kaufman said Tarrance resembled the composite sketch, and he also claimed to have a stash of incriminating evidence, including a roll of film depicting possible victims and a hooded costume like one the Zodiac wore during the Lake Berryessa attack. On a 2007 Discovery Channel documentary, a document examiner said Tarrance's handwriting matched the Zodiac's. Law enforcement officials dismissed Kaufman's evidence as "nonsense"; one photo showed a blob of color which he claimed was Black Dahlia victim Elizabeth Short. The hooded costume Kaufman produced was considered "much cruder" than what the Zodiac victims had described. Researchers also challenged the document examiner's credibility; she believed Tarrance had also written the JonBenét Ramsey ransom note. Tarrance died in 2006.
- Randy Kennedy came forward in 2014 saying that his best friend Louie Joseph Myers allegedly confessed to him in 2001 that he was the Zodiac. Myers had allegedly told Kennedy not to go to the police until after his death. Myers died in 2002. Kennedy claimed that the reason Myers killed the couples was because of a breakup with a girlfriend, and the reason for the murder of Paul Stine was to rob him for drug money. There are a few connections between Myers and the Zodiac: Myers had attended the same high schools as Betty Lou Jensen and David Faraday, and he allegedly worked in the same restaurant as Darlene Ferrin. Myers was in the Army from 1971 to 1973, and the Zodiac did not send any letters during that time. However, Myers was only 17 years old at the time of the Zodiac crimes.
- According to Voigt, fingerprint comparison in 1989 eliminated serial killer Ted Bundy as a person of interest in Zodiac's 1969 stabbing attack at Lake Berryessa.
- Before David Carpenter was identified as the so-called "Trailside Killer", there was speculation that the murders were committed by the Zodiac due to the physical description of the killer and area where he was active seeming strikingly similar. After Carpenter's arrest, he was quickly ruled out as a suspect as he was imprisoned during the time Faraday, Jensen, and Ferrin were killed.
- Ted Kaczynski, a domestic terrorist and mathematician also known as the Unabomber, was investigated for possible connections to the Zodiac in 1996. Kaczynski worked in Northern California at the time of the murders; like the Zodiac, he also had an interest in cryptography and threatened the press into publishing his communications. Kaczynski was ruled out by both the FBI and SFPD based on fingerprint and handwriting comparisons, and by his absence from California on certain dates of known Zodiac activity.
- Writer Mike Rodelli accused San Francisco-based business executive Kjell Qvale of living a "double life" as the Zodiac Killer. Qvale denied the allegation and threatened to sue Rodelli: "You can't find anybody in this city that's less likely to be the Zodiac Killer than me".
- In early 2023, Zodiac researcher Mike Morford suggested a suspect named William McDuff Andrew, who died in 2014. Morford said that he is "100 percent" certain that Andrew was the Zodiac Killer. Andrew lived near the phone-booth which the Zodiac used to call the police in 1969 following the Blue Rock Springs attack. He owned at least two copies of “The Codebreakers”, the book experts believe Zodiac used to create his ciphers. Andrew had a cousin who died in Deer Lodge, Montana following the Zodiac's attack at Lake Berryessa, during which the killer claimed to be an escaped convict from a prison in Deer Lodge. In 1974, Andrew got married and by that time, the Zodiac murders and letters may have ceased.
- Marvin Margolis (also known as Marvin Merrill) has been named by investigative consultant Alex Baber as a suspect in both the Zodiac killings and the 1947 murder of Elizabeth Short (the "Black Dahlia"). According to documents obtained, Margolis was a pre-medical student at USC and former U.S. Navy corpsman with medical training who was attached to the 1st Marine Division during World War II. Margolis had a romantic relationship with Short prior to her death, and was listed among 22 suspects in the Los Angeles County grand jury investigation into her murder. Baber further claims to have decrypted the Zodiac's unsolved Z13 cipher to reveal the name "Marvin Merrill", and argues that circumstantial links connect Margolis to the Zodiac crimes, including alleged access to a military-style bayonet similar to the weapon used at Lake Berryessa, handwriting similarities between Zodiac letters and correspondence attributed to the Black Dahlia killer, and geographic proximity to relevant crime scenes. Baber's findings, reported in the Los Angeles Times in December 2025, have been presented to multiple law enforcement agencies for review; however, no agency has publicly confirmed the conclusions, and Margolis has not been officially named as a Zodiac suspect by law enforcement. In May, the LAPD stated they were testing possible evidence recently unearthed by Detective Rick Jackson, who had obtained Margolis’s government fingerprint card from 1943, taken at his military service intake — something police had not previously examined. A podcast based on Baber's findings, Killer in the Code, has drawn both criticism and support from journalists, researchers, and investigators who have disputed or endorsed his methodology and conclusions. Baber has rejected the criticism.

== See also ==
- Ted Cruz–Zodiac Killer meme
