= Arthur Leigh Allen =

Zodiac Killer suspect (1931–1992)

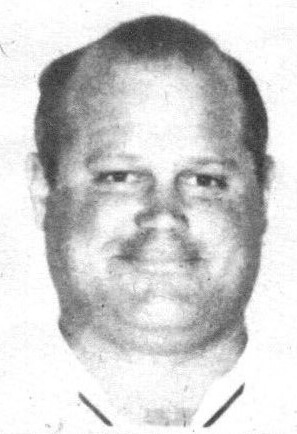
- Allen in 1967
- Born: December 18, 1933; Honolulu, Hawaii, U.S.
- Died: August 26, 1992 (aged 58); Vallejo, California, U.S.
- Occupations: Teacher, mechanic, cashier
- Known for: Zodiac Killer suspect
- Height: 6 ft (1.83 m)

Arthur Leigh Allen (December 18, 1933 – August 26, 1992) was an American teacher, mechanic, cashier, and convicted child molester, who is best known as the main suspect in the Zodiac Killer serial murders.

== Early life ==
Allen was born in Honolulu, Hawaii, on December 18, 1933. He grew up in Vallejo, California, and had a strained relationship with his mother. Allen entered the U.S. Navy on December 13, 1951, and served until his honorable discharge on December 12, 1959. During his time in the navy, he served mostly in the reserves but spent some time on active duty. He served on multiple submarines and earned the China Service Medal for his service in Southeast Asia. On April 4, 1958, Allen faced a special court-martial at Treasure Island for bringing a loaded .45 pistol onto the naval base. He was found not guilty. Allen attended California Polytechnic State College, where he was the California collegiate trampoline champion in 1959.

In the early 1960s, Allen moved to Atascadero, California, where he worked as a teacher and later as a mechanic. He was fired from his teaching job at an elementary school in March 1968 for molesting a student.

== Zodiac suspect ==
At the time of the Zodiac murders, Allen lived not far from several crime scenes and close to where victim Darlene Ferrin worked. On October 6, 1969, Allen was interviewed by Detective John Lynch of the Vallejo Police Department. Allen had been reported in the vicinity of the Lake Berryessa attack on September 27. He told Lynch that he was going to go to Lake Berryessa but changed his mind and went scuba diving at Salt Point State Park instead.

In 1971, Allen's former friend, Donald L. Cheney, reported to Manhattan Beach police that Allen had spoken of his desire to kill people, used the name Zodiac, and secured a flashlight to a firearm for visibility at night. Cheney said this conversation occurred no later than January 1, 1969. Allen was interviewed again on August 4, 1971, this time by Detective Mulanax of the Vallejo Police Department and Inspectors Toschi and Bill Armstrong of SFPD. Allen claimed he didn't recall the alleged conversation with Cheney. He brought up the previous interview he had after the Lake Berryessa murder; he admitted to having possession of bloody knives that day, claiming he used the knives to "kill a chicken". He also admitted to being in Riverside during the time of the murder of Cheri Jo Bates. Allen also talked about a book he enjoyed reading in high school called "The Most Dangerous Game", which Zodiac referenced in his first solved cipher. Allen owned and wore a Zodiac Watch, a brand that uses a logo similar to the killer's symbol. Allen and the Zodiac also both had shoes sized 10.5.

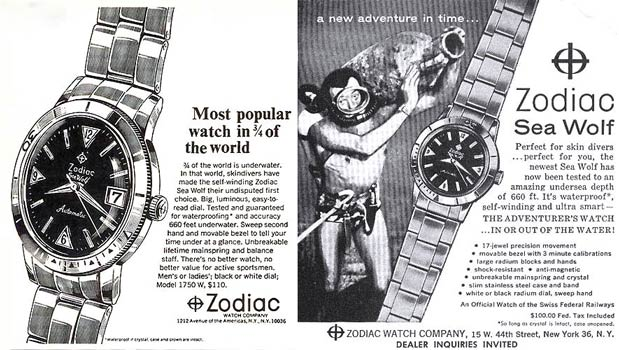
An advertisement for the Zodiac Watch, Allen's watch, which has the same logo as the Zodiac Killer

In September 1972, the SFPD obtained a search warrant for Allen's Santa Rosa trailer. Nothing incriminating was found. The SFPD took samples of Allen's handwriting, as well as obtaining his fingerprints; his handwriting couldn't be definitively linked to the Zodiac's, and his fingerprints didn't match the ones found in victim Paul Stine's cab.

In 1974, Allen was arrested for lewdness with a nine-year-old boy. After pleading guilty he was sent to Atascadero State Hospital for pre-sentence evaluation and treatment. On May 13, 1977, Allen was given a suspended prison sentence and five years of felony probation. He completed probation successfully in 1982.

Department of Justice Agent Jim Silver had asked Zodiac survivor Bryan Hartnell to observe Allen as he worked in a Vallejo hardware store. Hartnell watched Allen carefully and, at one time, spoke with him briefly. Hartnell reportedly said regarding the encounter, “I can’t say that that isn’t him.”

In December 1990, a felon named Ralph Spinelli told the Vallejo Police Department that Allen admitted to him that he was the Zodiac back in 1969. The VPD then served another search warrant at Allen's residence in February 1991 and seized some items. Despite its negative ramifications on his life, Allen continued to wear his Zodiac watch until it was seized during the execution of the search warrant. The letter sent to the Riverside Police Department from Cheri Jo Bates's killer was printed with either Elite or Pica typeface on a Royal typewriter; during the search of Allen's residence, police seized a Royal typewriter with Elite type. The same type of ammunition used to kill the Lake Herman Road victims was also found.

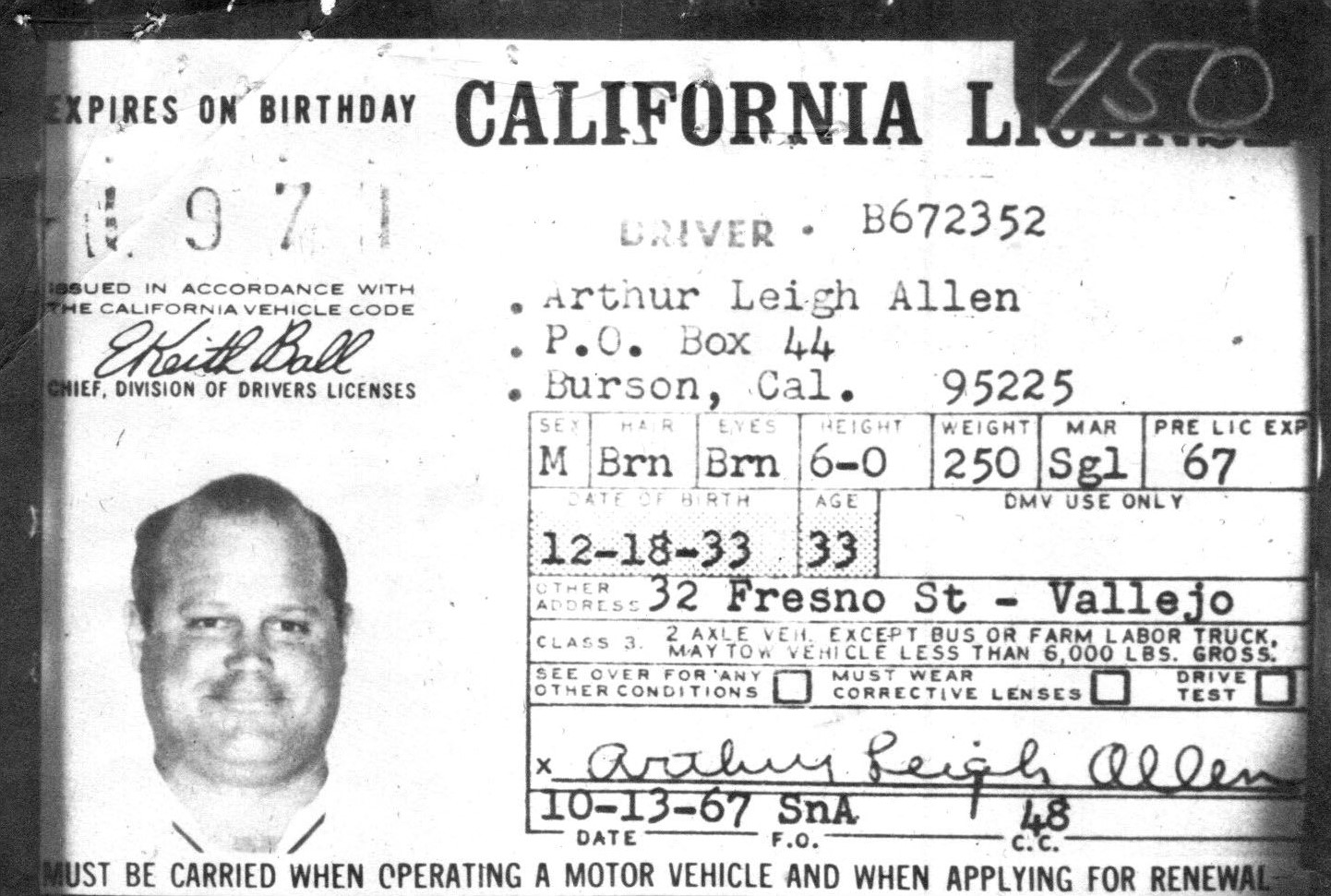
Allen's driver's license from 1967, showing his handwriting and appearance then

On August 16, 1991, Vallejo Police detective George Bawart showed Zodiac survivor Michael Mageau a photo lineup of 1968 driver's licenses with Allen's picture among them; Mageau picked out Allen as the man who shot him in 1969, saying, "That's him! It's the man who shot me!" However, by his own admission, Mageau never got a good look at the Zodiac and only saw him briefly as he was shot. Following this identification, authorities were considering charging Allen with the murders, as well as for possessing bomb-making materials that were found in his basement during the 1991 search of his home.

After the public announcement of Allen being the prime suspect in the case, he began granting interviews to proclaim his innocence. Shortly before his death, Allen wrote a letter to Rita Williams, a reporter from San Francisco station KTVU who had just interviewed him. The letter contained grammatical mistakes similar to those of the Zodiac letters. Williams firmly believes that Allen was the Zodiac, despite him denying being the culprit. Allen died from a heart attack on August 26, 1992. Two days after his death in 1992, the VPD served another warrant at Allen's house and seized more property from his residence. A video tape with the letter "Z" on it was found, but authorities say that it didn't contain a confession from Allen.

In 2002, Cydne Holt of the SFPD crime lab developed a partial DNA profile from saliva on stamps and envelopes of the Zodiac's letters – especially the stamp on the November 8, 1969, card – for the ABC News program Primetime Thursday. A partial DNA profile cannot "point to just one person", it "can only rule someone in as a possibility or exclude them if it isn't a match". The SFPD compared this partial profile to that of Allen and Cheney. Since neither test result indicated a match, the two were excluded as the contributors of the DNA.

=== 2007 film and documentary ===
Allen was played by John Carroll Lynch in the 2007 David Fincher film Zodiac, which is based on Robert Graysmith's book. That same year, Graysmith noted that several policemen described Allen as the most likely suspect.

Police officer Donald Fouke, who (with officer Eric Zelms) possibly saw the Zodiac fleeing the Paul Stine murder scene, said in the 2007 documentary His Name was Arthur Leigh Allen that Allen weighed about 100 pounds more than the man Fouke saw, and that Allen's face was "too round". Nancy Slover, the police dispatcher who received the call from the Zodiac after the Mageau–Ferrin shooting, said in the documentary that Allen did not sound like the man with whom she spoke.

=== Later developments ===
Retired police handwriting expert Lloyd Cunningham, who worked on the Zodiac case for decades, stated in 2009, "They gave me banana boxes full of Allen's writing, and none of his writing even came close to the Zodiac. Nor did DNA extracted from the envelopes [on the Zodiac letters] come close to Arthur Leigh Allen". In 2010, SFPD investigator Dave Toschi stated that all the evidence against Allen ultimately "turned out to be negative".

In 2018, the veteran Zodiac internet sleuth Tom Voigt stated that the partial profile's efficacy from 2002 was dubious, as he had learned the DNA was "collected from the outside of the stamp" on the November 1969 card; "No genetic material was obtained from behind the stamp, or the seal of the envelope, or anywhere else that would have most certainly belonged to the Zodiac". Voigt claimed that this had been confirmed by Holt as well as an unnamed retired SFPD inspector, and that this discovery reaffirmed Allen's status as a viable suspect.

A three-episode documentary, This Is the Zodiac Speaking, aired on Netflix in 2024. In the film, Allen's former students fondly recall his interest in cryptology. He also brought dead animals into the classroom. Numerous allegations are also made by former acquaintances, members of the Seawater family. Zodiac researcher Michael Butterfield was skeptical of the documentary's allegations.
