= Zodiac Watches =

American brand of Swiss-made watches

- Formerly: Ariste Calame; Montres Zodiac SA
- Type: Subsidiary
- Industry: Watchmaking
- Founded: 1882; 144 years ago in Le Locle, Switzerland
- Founder: Ariste Calame
- Headquarters: Richardson, Texas, U.S.
- Parent: Fossil Group
- Website: zodiacwatches.com

Zodiac Watches, or simply Zodiac, is an American-owned brand of Swiss-made watches founded in 1882 by Ariste Calame in Le Locle, Switzerland. The company mostly focuses on its dive watches through its Sea Wolf line, one of the first modern dive watches, which debuted in 1953, before the Rolex Submariner and after Blancpain Fifty Fathoms. Although Zodiac was acquired by Fossil Group in 2001, its manufacturing remained in Bienne, Switzerland. Zodiac and Fossil Group are headquartered in Richardson, Texas.

== History ==
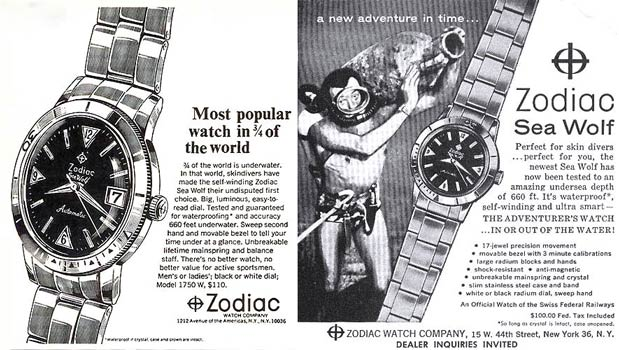
Vintage Sea Wolf ad from 1959

In 1882, Ariste Calame founded a workshop for the production of watches in Le Locle, Switzerland. The original name of the company was Ariste Calame and would later become Zodiac. The name Zodiac was not registered until 1908, despite being used earlier by the company. The founder's son, Louis Ariste Calame, was sent to watchmaking school and took over the company in 1895.

The first flat pocket watch, launched in 1928, used the Zodiac calibre 1617 movement. In 1930, the brand designed and produced the first automatic sports watch and the popular Zodiac Autographic. The Autographic was self-winding with a power reserve gauge, an unbreakable crystal, and a radium dial and was water and shock resistant. In 1953, Zodiac introduced the Sea Wolf as the first purpose-built "dive watch" manufactured and marketed to the masses. To date, the original Sea Wolf and its successor, the early-1970s Super Sea Wolf, are considered two of the most iconic commercial dive watches.

With a patented crown/stem system and improved case back design, Super Sea Wolf's water pressure rating increased from 200-meter rating to 750 meters. The 750-meter-rated Super Sea Wolf was introduced in the early 1970s and was used by the U.S. Navy SEALs.

The Zodiac Aerospace is a popular vintage Zodiac model that takes after the original Sea Wolf's design. It was released in 1960 and is a GMT watch with a red GMT hand and 24 hours indicated on its two-colour bezel.

In October 2025, as part of a restructuring plan in the UK, Zodiac's parent company Fossil sought US recognition and placed its US business in Chapter 15 bankruptcy.

== Financial troubles and Fossil Inc. acquisition ==
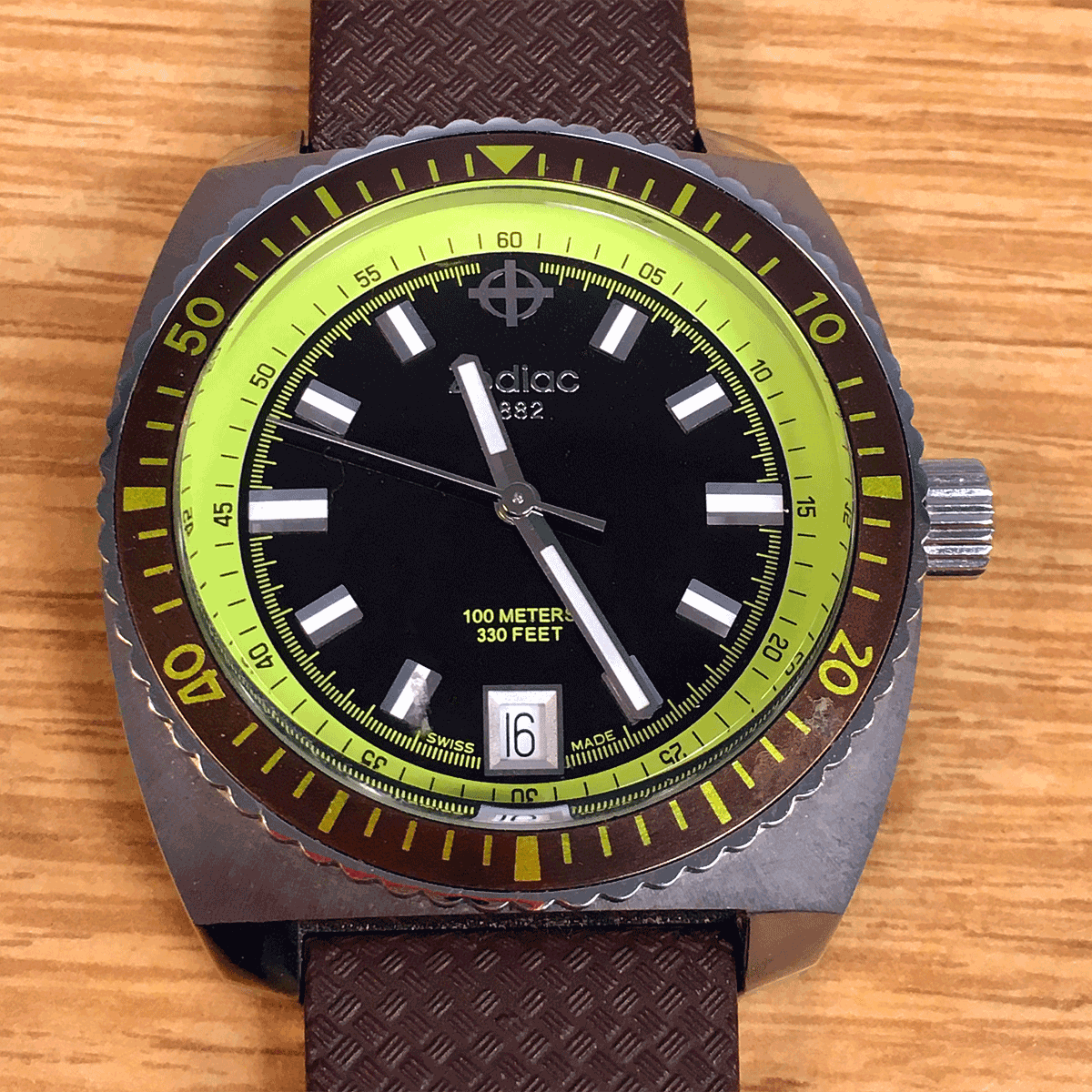
Zodiac Seadragon watch Z02908

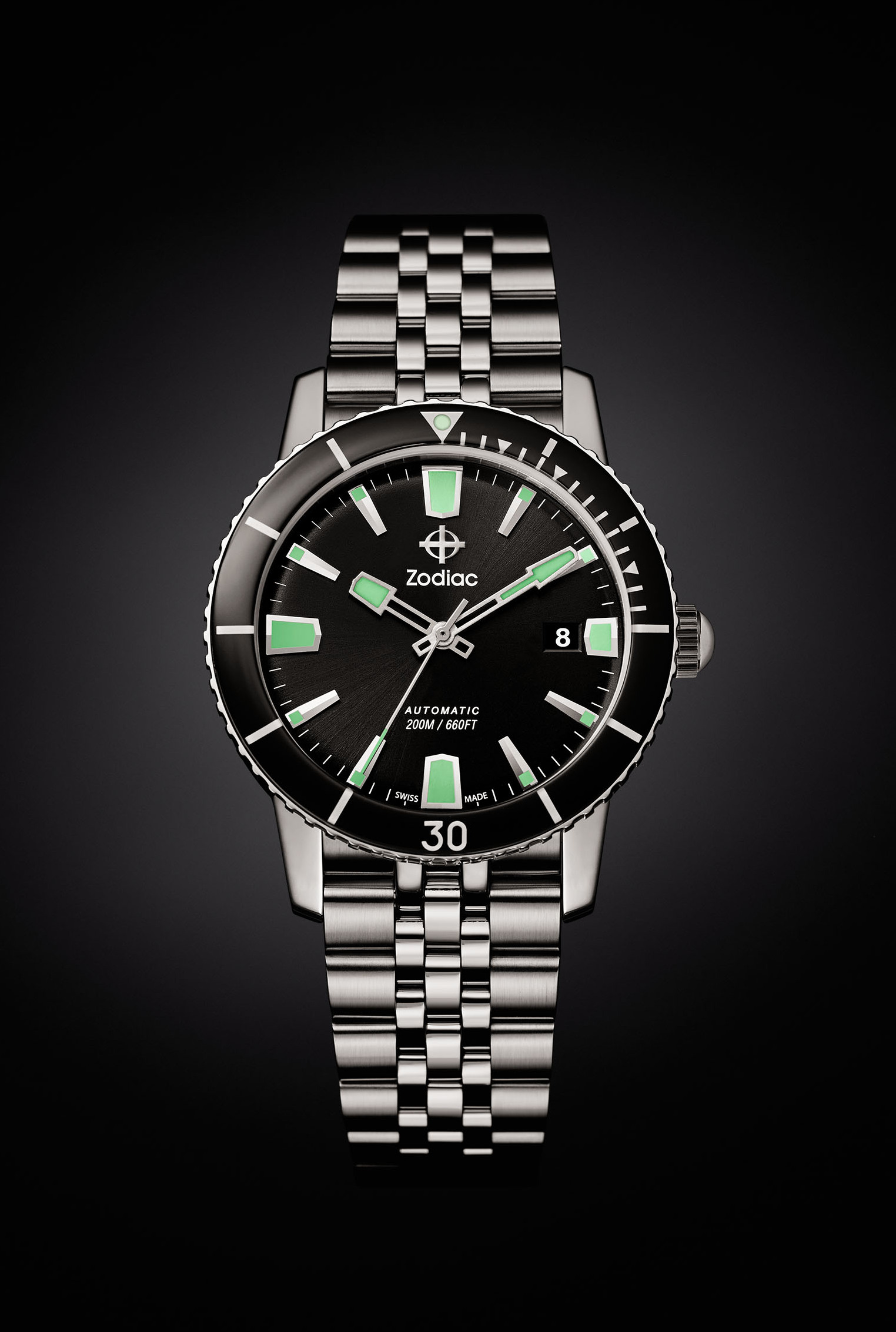
Sea Wolf model relaunch, 2015

In 1990, Willy Gad Monnier, formerly of TAG Heuer, purchased the Zodiac brand, but the company, Montres Zodiac SA, went bankrupt in November 1997. In September 1998, Genender International, Inc. purchased the Zodiac inventory, including their trademarks, registrations, and other assets. Genender discontinued the "Point" series models, Swiss Formulas, Sea Wolf, most automatic watches, and automatic chronographs. The only two 1990s models kept were the Super Sea Wolf and the Marine Life, both of which were updated with new metal bands.

On October 1, 2001, Fossil Inc. acquired the worldwide rights to the Zodiac brand name for approximately $4.7 million for use in watches, clocks, and other timekeeping devices.

In April 2002, the new Zodiac line was introduced at the BaselWorld watch show in Switzerland, with the notable absence of any Sea Wolf model for the first time in 50 years.

In February 2010, Fossil Inc. launched the ZMX (Zodiac Mission Extreme) line to reflect a new segment of sports and outdoor enthusiasts. The much larger case sizes (44 mm and up) and caoutchouc rubber straps denoted the bulk of watch lines, focused on automotive racing (ZMX Racer), aviation (ZMX Aviator), diving (ZMX Oceanaire), and exploration (ZMX Adventurer).

February 2015 marked the return of Sea Wolf, with a reissue of vintage-inspired versions of the 1954 model in two editions, "Skin Diver" and "Diver." Since the depth rating on the new Sea Wolf was the same as the original (200 meters/660 feet), the technical advancements came primarily in the form of its automatic movement: the Fossil Group-manufactured STP 1-11 (Swiss Technology Production 1-11), housing 26 jewels with 44-hour power reserve.

== Zodiac Killer ==
The Zodiac Killer, an unidentified American serial killer who was active in Northern California in the late 1960s and early 70s, may have been inspired by the brand. The killer signed a series of taunting letters using a symbol that looked like the Zodiac watch logo. At the time, the only other place the name and the symbol were connected was in Zodiac watch ads.

The Zodiac Sea Wolf was featured in the 2007 film Zodiac, directed by David Fincher and based on Robert Graysmith's true-crime book, Zodiac. In both the book and the film, a Zodiac Sea Wolf was worn by serial killer suspect Arthur Leigh Allen.
