= Zodiac (film) =

2007 film by David Fincher

- Theatrical release poster
- Directed by: David Fincher
- Screenplay by: James Vanderbilt
- Based on: Zodiac and Zodiac Unmasked by Robert Graysmith
- Produced by: Mike Medavoy; Arnold W. Messer; Bradley J. Fischer; James Vanderbilt; Ceán Chaffin
- Starring: Jake Gyllenhaal; Mark Ruffalo; Robert Downey Jr.; Anthony Edwards; Brian Cox; Elias Koteas; Donal Logue; John Carroll Lynch; Dermot Mulroney
- Cinematography: Harris Savides
- Edited by: Angus Wall
- Music by: David Shire
- Production companies: Paramount Pictures; Warner Bros. Pictures; Phoenix Pictures
- Distributed by: Paramount Pictures (United States and Canada); Warner Bros. Pictures (International)
- Release dates: February 28, 2007 (New York City); March 2, 2007 (United States)
- Running time: 157 minutes
- Country: United States
- Language: English
- Budget: $65–85 million
- Box office: $84.7 million

Zodiac is a 2007 American crime thriller film directed by David Fincher and written by James Vanderbilt, based on the non-fiction books by Robert Graysmith: Zodiac (1986) and Zodiac Unmasked (2002). It stars Jake Gyllenhaal, Mark Ruffalo, and Robert Downey Jr., with Anthony Edwards, Brian Cox, Elias Koteas, Donal Logue, John Carroll Lynch, Chloë Sevigny, Philip Baker Hall, and Dermot Mulroney in supporting roles.

The film tells the story of the manhunt for the Zodiac Killer, a serial killer who terrorized the San Francisco Bay Area during the late 1960s and early 1970s, taunting police with letters, bloodstained clothing, and ciphers mailed to newspapers. The case remains one of the United States' most infamous unsolved crimes. Fincher, Vanderbilt, and producer Bradley J. Fischer spent 18 months conducting their own investigation and research into the Zodiac murders. Fincher employed the digital Thomson Viper FilmStream camera to photograph most of the film and used traditional high-speed film cameras for slow-motion murder sequences.

Zodiac was released by Paramount Pictures in the United States and Canada and by Warner Bros. Pictures in international markets on March 2, 2007. It received largely positive reviews, with praise for its writing, directing, acting, and historical accuracy. The film was nominated for several awards, including the Saturn Award for Best Action, Adventure or Thriller Film. It grossed over $84.7 million worldwide on a production budget of $65 million. In a 2016 critics' poll conducted by the BBC, Zodiac was voted the 12th greatest film of the 21st century.

In the years since its release, the film has garnered a large cult following, with many claiming it to be David Fincher's magnum opus. Most of the film's followers praise its direction, acting, writing, cinematography, production design, soundtrack, attention to detail, and accuracy to both the real life investigation and the obsession that gripped some of those who were either directly involved with or close to the investigation itself.

== Plot ==
On July 4, 1969, an unknown man attacks Darlene Ferrin and Mike Mageau with a handgun at a lovers' lane in Vallejo, California. Only Mike survives and later disappears from the public eye. One month later, the San Francisco Chronicle receives encrypted letters written by the killer, calling himself "Zodiac", who threatens to kill a dozen people, unless his coded message containing his identity is published.

Political cartoonist Robert Graysmith, who correctly guesses that his identity is not in the message, is not taken seriously by crime reporter Paul Avery or the editors and is excluded from the initial details about the killings. When the newspaper publishes the letters, a married couple deciphers one, revealing it indeed did not contain the killer's name. On September 27, the killer stabs law student, Bryan Hartnell and Cecelia Shepard at Lake Berryessa in Napa County; Cecelia dies two days later.

At the office, Avery makes fun of Graysmith before they discuss the coded letters. Graysmith interprets the letter, which Avery finds helpful, and he begins sharing information. One of Graysmith's insights about the letters is that Zodiac's reference to man as, "the most dangerous animal of them all," is a reference to the 1932 film The Most Dangerous Game, which features the villainous Count Zaroff, a man who hunts live human prey.

On October 11, San Francisco taxicab driver Paul Stine is shot and killed in the city's Presidio Heights district. The Zodiac killer mails pieces of Stine's bloodstained shirt to the Chronicle along with a taunting letter. San Francisco police inspectors Dave Toschi and his partner, Bill Armstrong, are assigned to the case by Captain Marty Lee, and work closely with Vallejo's Jack Mulanax and Captain Ken Narlow in Napa. Someone claiming to be Zodiac continues to send taunting letters and speaks on the phone with lawyer, Melvin Belli, on the KGO-TV morning talk show, hosted by Jim Dunbar.

On August 4, 1971, Detectives Toschi, Armstrong, and Mulanax question Arthur Leigh Allen, a suspect in the Vallejo case. They notice that he wears a Zodiac wristwatch, with the same logo used by the killer, and Toschi thinks he is the killer. However, a handwriting expert Sherwood insists that Allen did not write the Zodiac letters, even though Allen is said to be ambidextrous.

Avery receives a letter threatening his life; becoming paranoid, he turns to drugs and alcohol. He shares information with the Riverside Police Department that the killer might have been active before the initial killings, angering Toschi and Armstrong. The case's notoriety weighs on Toschi, who cannot sit through a Hollywood film, Dirty Harry, loosely based on the Zodiac case.

In 1976, Avery moves to the Sacramento Bee. Graysmith persistently contacts Toschi about the Zodiac murders, and eventually impresses him with his knowledge of the case. While Toschi cannot directly give Graysmith access to the evidence, he provides names in other police departments where Zodiac murders occurred. Armstrong transfers from the San Francisco Police homicide division, and Toschi is demoted for supposedly forging a Zodiac letter in 1978.

Graysmith continues his own investigation, profiled in the Chronicle, and gives a television interview about the book he is writing on the case. He begins receiving phone calls from someone breathing heavily. As his obsession deepens, Graysmith loses his job, and his wife Melanie leaves him, taking their children. Graysmith learns that Allen lived close to Ferrin, and his birthday matches the one Zodiac gave when he spoke to one of Melvin Belli's maids. While circumstantial evidence seems to indicate his guilt, the physical evidence, such as fingerprints and handwriting samples, does not implicate him.

On December 20, 1983, Graysmith tracks Allen to a Vallejo Ace Hardware store, where he is employed as a sales clerk; they stare at each other before Graysmith leaves. On August 16, 1991, after Graysmith's book, Zodiac, has become a bestseller, Mike Mageau resurfaces after years of drug use, and identifies Allen from a police mugshot.

A textual epilogue says that Allen died of a heart attack in 1992 before police could question him; and though a 2002 DNA test did not match Allen's, the police refused to rule him out as a suspect. Allen remains the prime and only suspect in the counties of Napa and Solano and the city of Vallejo, and to this day, the case remains open.

== Cast ==
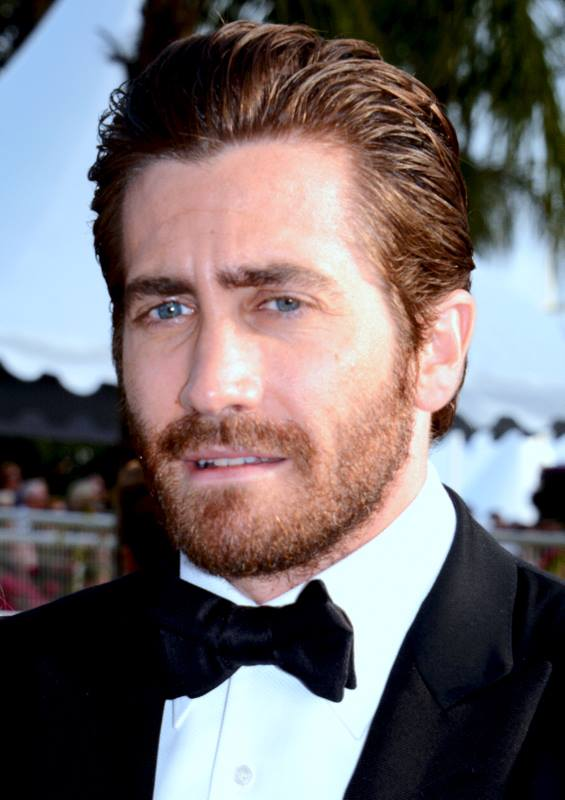
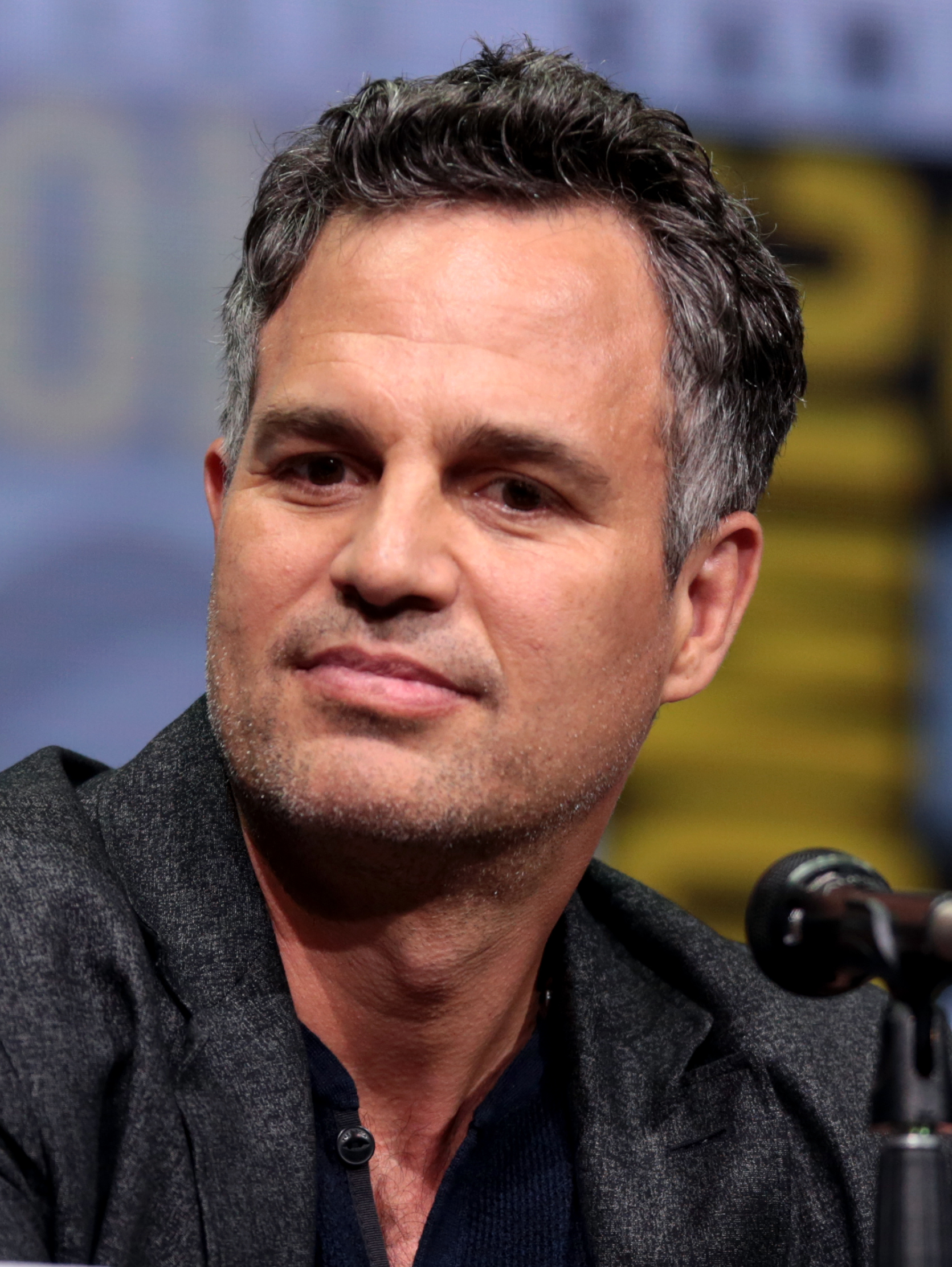
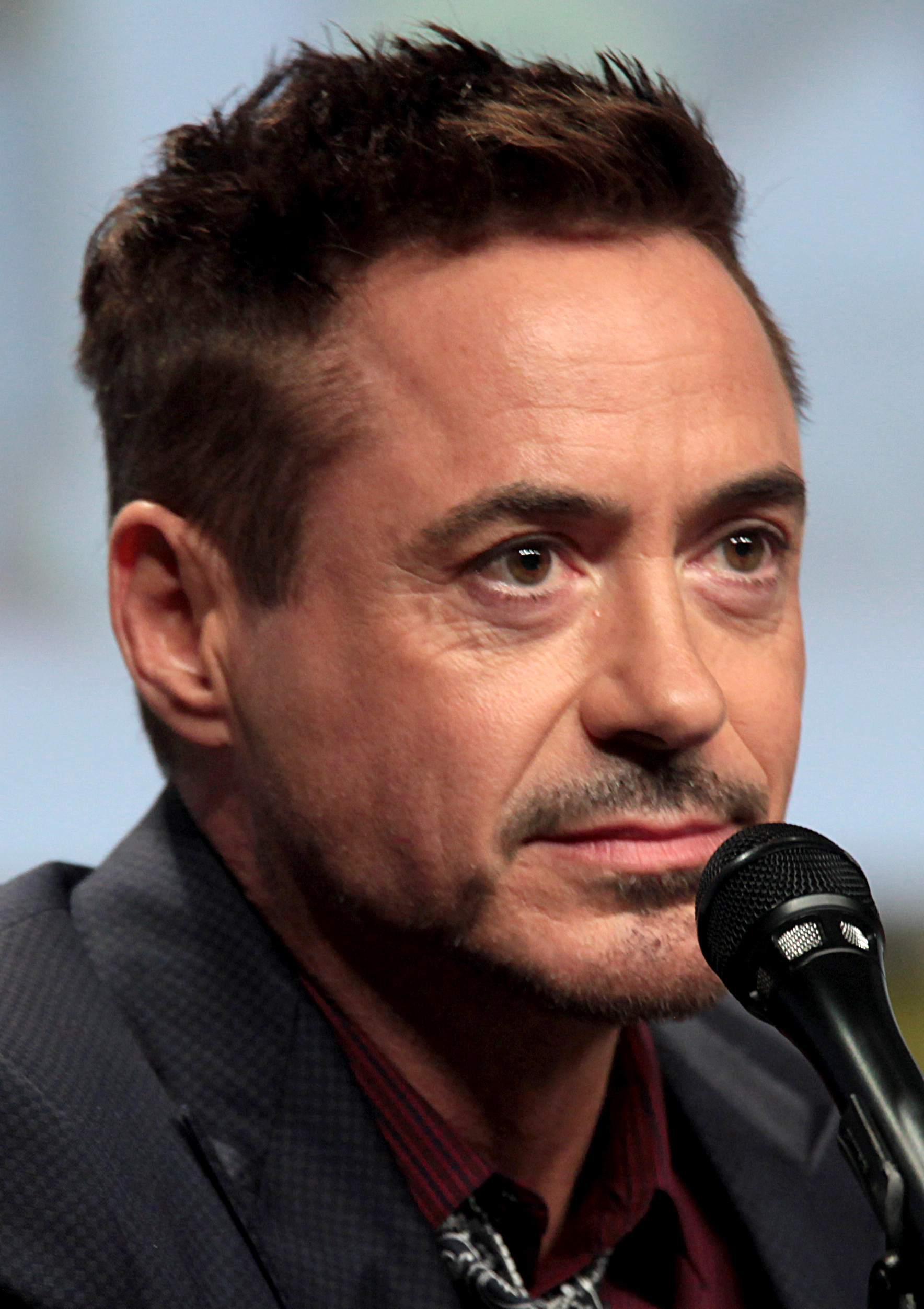
(L to R) Jake Gyllenhaal (pictured in 2015), Mark Ruffalo (2017), and Robert Downey Jr. (2014)
- Jake Gyllenhaal as Robert Graysmith
- Mark Ruffalo as Inspector Dave Toschi
- Robert Downey Jr. as Paul Avery
- Anthony Edwards as Inspector Bill Armstrong
- Brian Cox as Melvin Belli
- Charles Fleischer as Bob Vaughn
- Zach Grenier as Mel Nicolai
- Philip Baker Hall as Sherwood Morrill
- Elias Koteas as Sergeant Jack Mulanax
- James LeGros as Detective George Bawart
- Donal Logue as Captain Ken Narlow
- John Carroll Lynch as Arthur Leigh Allen
- Dermot Mulroney as Captain Marty Lee
- Chloë Sevigny as Melanie Graysmith
- John Terry as Charles Thieriot
- June Diane Raphael as Carol Toschi
- Ciara Moriarty as Darlene Ferrin
- Adam Goldberg as Duffy Jennings
- Tom Verica as Jim Dunbar
- Lee Norris as Mike Mageau
- Jimmi Simpson as Older Mike Mageau
- Joel Bissonnette as Inspector Kracke
- John Getz as Templeton Peck
- John Mahon as Captain Gillette
- Matt Winston as John Allen
- Jules Bruff as Catherine Allen
- John Ennis as Terry Pascoe
- Patrick Scott Lewis as Bryan Hartnell
- Pell James as Cecelia Shepard
- Clea DuVall as Linda del Buono
- Zachary Sauers as Aaron Graysmith
- Micah Sauers as David Graysmith
- Candy Clark as Carol Fisher
- Paul Schulze as Sandy Panzarella
- John Hemphill as Donald Cheney
- Ed Setrakian as Al Hyman
- The titular serial killer is portrayed by different actors in different scenes:
  - Richmond Arquette as Zodiac 1 / Zodiac 2
  - Bob Stephenson as Zodiac 3
  - John Lacy as Zodiac 4
  - In addition, recordings of Arquette, Stephenson, Lacy, Lynch, and Fleischer were spliced together to provide the voice of the Zodiac.
- Barry Livingston as Copy Editor #3
- Ione Skye as Kathleen Johns (uncredited)

== Production ==
=== Development ===
Robert Graysmith first sold the film rights to his true crime book Zodiac to Shane Salerno, with whom he had established a close relationship. Salerno managed to make a deal with Ricardo Mestres of Great Oaks Entertainment to co-produce and write the film for Touchstone Pictures. According to Stuart Hazeldine, who was pitched to rewrite it, the script would have been about the Zodiac killer resurfacing in Los Angeles.

James Vanderbilt had read Graysmith's book Zodiac while in high school. Years later, after becoming a screenwriter, he got the opportunity to meet Graysmith, and became fascinated by the folklore surrounding the Zodiac killer. He decided to try to translate the story into a script. Vanderbilt had endured bad experiences in the past in which the endings of his scripts had been changed, and wanted to have more control over the material this time. He pitched his adaptation of Zodiac to Mike Medavoy and Bradley J. Fischer from Phoenix Pictures, agreeing to write a spec script if he could have more creative control over it.

Graysmith met Fischer and Vanderbilt at the premiere of Paul Schrader's film Auto Focus, based on Graysmith's 1991 book about the life and death of actor Bob Crane. A deal was made and they optioned the rights to Zodiac and Zodiac Unmasked when they became available after languishing at another studio for nearly a decade. David Fincher was their first choice to direct based on his work on Seven. Originally, he was going to direct an adaptation of James Ellroy's novel The Black Dahlia (later filmed by Brian De Palma), and envisioned a five-hour, $80 million mini-series with film stars. When that failed to materialize, Fincher left that project and moved on to Zodiac.

I remember coming home and saying the highway patrol had been following our school buses for a couple weeks now. And my dad, who worked from home, and who was very dry, not one to soft-pedal things, turned slowly in his chair and said: 'Oh yeah. There's a serial killer who has killed four or five people, who calls himself Zodiac, who's threatened to take a high-powered rifle and shoot out the tires of a school bus, and then shoot the children as they come off the bus.'

— Fincher explaining his Zodiac obsession

For the young Fincher, he was drawn to the Zodiac story because he spent much of his childhood in San Anselmo in Marin County during the initial murders; he thought the killer "was the ultimate boogeyman". The director was also drawn to the unresolved ending of Vanderbilt's screenplay because it felt true to real life, as cases are not always solved. Fincher felt his job was to dispel the enduring mythic stature of the case by clearly defining what was fact and what was fiction. He told Vanderbilt that he wanted the screenplay rewritten with research done from the original police reports. Fincher found that there was much speculation and hearsay and, therefore, wanted to interview people who were directly involved in the case in-person to see if their stories were believable. He did this because he felt a burden of responsibility in making a film that convicted someone posthumously.

Fincher, Fischer and Vanderbilt spent months interviewing witnesses, family members of suspects, retired and current investigators, the two surviving victims, and the mayors of San Francisco and Vallejo. Fincher said, "Even when we did our own interviews, we would talk to two people. One would confirm some aspects of it and another would deny it. Plus, so much time had passed, memories are affected and the different telling of the stories would change perception. So when there was any doubt we always went with the police reports." During the course of their research, Fincher and Fischer hired Gerald McMenamin, a forensic linguistics expert and professor of linguistics at California State University Fresno, to analyze the Zodiac's letters. Unlike document examiners in the 1970s, he focused on the language of the Zodiac and how he formed his sentences in terms of structure and spelling.

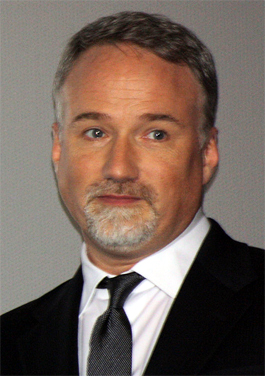
David Fincher, director

Fincher and Fischer approached Metro-Goldwyn-Mayer (MGM) to finance the film but talks fell through because MGM wanted the running time fixed at two hours and fifteen minutes. Warner Bros. Pictures and Paramount Pictures agreed to share the production costs and were more flexible about the running time. The executives were concerned about the large amount of dialogue, lack of action scenes, and inconclusive ending. When Dave Toschi met Fincher, Fischer, and Vanderbilt, Fincher told him that he was not going to make another Dirty Harry (which is loosely based on the Zodiac case). Toschi was impressed with their knowledge of the case and realized that he had learned from them. Toschi watched Zodiac several times and said "I thought Ruffalo did a good job," but also that the film reminded him of old frustrations that the case was never closed. The Zodiac's surviving victims, Mike Mageau and Bryan Hartnell, were consultants on the film.

Alan J. Pakula's film All the President's Men was the template for Zodiac as Fincher felt that it was also "the story of a reporter determined to get the story at any cost and one who was new to being an investigative reporter. It was all about his obsession to know the truth." Like in that film, he did not want to spend time telling the back story of any of the characters, focusing, instead, on what they did in regards to the case." Vanderbilt was drawn to the notion that Graysmith went from a cartoonist to one of the most significant investigators of the case. He pitched the story as: "What if Garry Trudeau woke up one morning and tried to solve the Son of Sam"? As he worked on the script, he became friends with Graysmith. The filmmakers secured the cooperation of the Vallejo Police Department (one of the key investigators at the time) because they hoped that the film would inspire someone to come forward with information that might help solve the cold case.

=== Casting ===
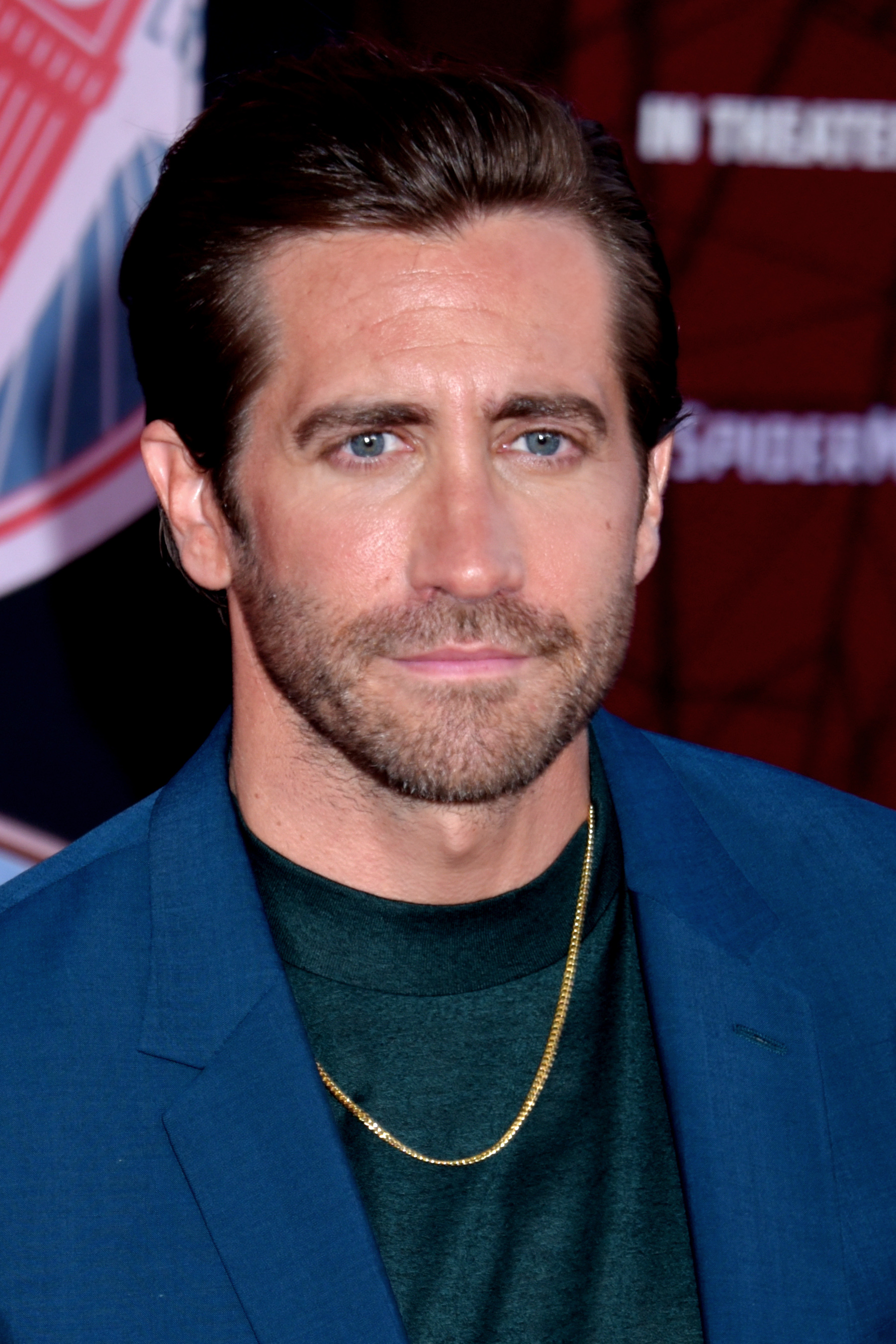
Jake Gyllenhaal portrayed Robert Graysmith

One of Fincher's earliest conversations on the film's casting was with Jennifer Aniston. She talked about actors she had enjoyed working with; they were Jake Gyllenhaal (The Good Girl) and Mark Ruffalo (Rumor Has It). While researching the film, Fincher considered Gyllenhaal to play Robert Graysmith. According to Fincher, "I really liked him in Donnie Darko and I thought, 'He's an interesting double-sided coin. He can do that naive thing but he can also do possessed.'" In preparation for his role Gyllenhaal met Graysmith, and videotaped him to study his mannerisms and behavior.

Initially, Mark Ruffalo was not interested in the project but Fincher wanted him to play David Toschi. He met with Ruffalo and told him that he was rewriting the screenplay. "I loved what he was saying and loved where he was going with it", Ruffalo remembers. For research, he read every report on the case and read all the books on the subject. Ruffalo met Toschi and found out that he had "perfect recall of the details and what happened when, where, who was there, what he was wearing. He always knew what he was wearing. I think it is seared into who he is and it was a big deal for him."

Fincher thought of Anthony Edwards for the role of Inspector William Armstrong, saying "I knew I needed the most decent person I could find, because he would be the balance of the movie. In a weird way, this movie wouldn't exist without Bill Armstrong. Everything we know about the Zodiac case, we know because of his notes. So in casting the part, I wanted to get someone who is totally reliable." Originally, Gary Oldman was to play Melvin Belli but "he went to a lot of trouble, they had appliances, but just physically it wasn't going to work, he just didn't have the girth", Graysmith said. Brian Cox was cast instead. Lee Norris played the 1969 Mike Mageau, and Jimmi Simpson played the character's older version.

=== Principal photography ===
Fincher decided to use the digital Thomson Viper FilmStream Camera to shoot the film, having previously used it on commercials for Nike, Hewlett-Packard, Heineken, and Lexus, which allowed him to get used to and experiment with the equipment. The film was not shot entirely digitally, as traditional high-speed film cameras were used for slow-motion murder sequences.

Once shot on the Viper camera, the files were converted to DVCPro HD 1080i and edited in Final Cut Pro. This was for editorial decisions only. During the later stages of editing the original uncompressed 1080p 4:4:4 RAW digital source footage was assembled automatically to maintain an up-to-date digital "negative" of the film.

Fincher had previously worked with director of photography Harris Savides on Seven (he shot the opening credits) and The Game. Savides loved the script but realized, "there was so much exposition, just people talking on the phone or having conversations. It was difficult to imagine how it could be done in a visual way." Fincher and Savides did not want to repeat the look of Seven. The director's approach to Zodiac was to create a look mundane enough that audiences would accept that what they were watching was the truth. The filmmakers also did not want to glamorize the killer or tell the story through his eyes. "That would have turned the story into a first-person-shooter video game. We didn't want to make the sort of movie that serial killers would want to own," Fincher said.

Savides' first experience with the Viper Filmstream camera was shooting a Motorola commercial with Fincher. From there, he used it on Zodiac. Fincher wanted to make sure that the camera was more inclined towards film production so that the studio would be more comfortable about using it on a project with a large budget. To familiarize himself with the camera, he "did as many things 'wrong' as I possibly could. I went against everything I was supposed to do with the camera." Savides felt comfortable with the camera despite its certain limitations.

Fincher and Savides used the photographs of William Eggleston, Stephen Shore's work from the early Seventies, and actual photos from the Zodiac police files. The two men worked hard to capture the look and feel of the period as Fincher admitted, "I suppose there could have been more VW bugs but I think what we show is a pretty good representation of the time. It is not technically perfect. There are some flaws but some are intended." The San Francisco Chronicle was built in the old post office in the Terminal Annex Building in downtown Los Angeles. A building on nearby Spring Street subbed for the Hall of Justice and the San Francisco Police Department. Principal photography began on September 12, 2005. The filmmakers shot for five weeks in the San Francisco Bay Area and the rest of the time in Los Angeles, bringing the film in under budget, wrapping in February 2006. The film took 115 days to shoot.

Some of the cast was not happy with Fincher's exacting ways and perfectionism. Some scenes required upward of 70 takes. Gyllenhaal was frustrated by the director's methods and commented in an interview, "You get a take, 5 takes, 10 takes. Some places, 90 takes. But there is a stopping point. There's a point at which you go, 'That's what we have to work with.' But we would reshoot things. So there came a point where I would say, well, what do I do? Where's the risk?" Downey said, "I just decided, aside from several times I wanted to garrote him, that I was going to give him what he wanted. I think I'm a perfect person to work for him, because I understand gulags". Fincher responded, "If an actor is going to let the role come to them, they can't resent the fact that I'm willing to wait as long as that takes. You know, the first day of production in San Francisco we shot 56 takes of Mark and Jake – and it's the 56th take that's in the movie". Ruffalo also defended his director's methods when he said, "The way I see it is, you enter into someone else's world as an actor. You can put your expectations aside and have an experience that's new and pushes and changes you, or hold on to what you think it should be and have a stubborn, immovable journey that's filled with disappointment and anger."

=== Visual effects ===
Side-by-side comparison of soundstage blue screen work (left) with finished CGI-enhanced scene

Digital Domain handled most of the film's 200+ visual effects shots, including pools of blood and bloody fingerprints found at crime scenes. For the murder of Cecelia Shepard at Lake Berryessa, blood seepage and clothing stains were added in post-production. Fincher did not want to shoot the blood with practical effects because cleaning the costumes after every take would be too time-consuming, so the murder sequences were done with computer-generated imagery (CGI) blood.

CGI was also used to recreate the San Francisco neighborhood at Washington and Cherry Streets where cab driver Paul Stine was killed. The area had changed significantly over the years and residents did not want the murder to be recreated in their neighborhood, so Fincher shot the sequence on a bluescreen stage. Production designer Donald Burt gave the visual effects team detailed drawings of the intersection as it was in 1969. Photographs of every possible angle of the area were shot with a high-resolution digital camera, allowing the effects crew to build computer-based geometric models of homes that were then textured with period facades. 3D vintage police motorcycles, squad cars, a firetruck and street lights were added to the final CGI shot.

Several of the film's establishing shots of the 1970s-era Bay Area were created by the Marin County visual effects house Matte World Digital (MWD). The "helicopter shots" of the fireworks-laden sky over Vallejo, the San Francisco waterfront, and the overhead shot of the cab driving through San Francisco were CGI, as was the shot looking down at traffic from the tower of the Golden Gate Bridge. A time-lapse sequence of the construction of the Transamerica Pyramid was a hybrid of 2D and 3D matte painting, created using reference photos of the Pyramid taken from the rooftop of Francis Ford Coppola's Sentinel Building. MWD visual effects supervisor Craig Barron researched the Pyramid's construction for accuracy.

== Soundtrack ==
Originally, Fincher envisaged the film's soundtrack to be composed of 40 cues of vintage music spanning the nearly three decades of the Zodiac story. Fincher and music supervisor George Drakoulias searched for pop songs that reflected the era, including Three Dog Night's cover of "Easy to Be Hard".

Fincher did not plan an original score for the film but rather a tapestry of sound design, vintage songs of the period, sound bites and clips of KFRC and advertisements for "Mathews Top of the Hill Daly City" (a prominent local consumer electronics dealership of the time). He told the studio that he did not need a composer and would purchase the rights to various songs instead. They agreed, but as the film developed, sound designer Ren Klyce felt there were some scenes that could have used original music. Klyce inserted music from one of his favorite soundtracks, David Shire's score for The Conversation.

Klyce contacted film and sound editor Walter Murch who worked on The Conversation, and he connected Klyce with Shire. Fincher sent Shire a copy of the script and flew him in to Los Angeles for a meeting. Fincher only wanted 15–20 minutes of score and based solely on piano. Shire worked on it and incorporated textures of a Charles Ives piece called "The Unanswered Question" and Conversation-based cues, he found that he had 37 minutes of original music. The orchestra Shire assembled consisted of musicians from the San Francisco Opera and San Francisco Ballet. Shire said, "There are 12 signs of the Zodiac and there is a way of using atonal and tonal music. So we used 12 tones, never repeating any of them but manipulating them". He used specific instruments to represent the characters: the trumpet for Toschi, the solo piano for Graysmith and the dissonant strings for the Zodiac killer.

Soundtrack CD
No.	Title	Writer(s)	Performing artist	Length
1.	"Easy to Be Hard"	Galt MacDermot; James Rado; Gerome Ragni	Three Dog Night	3:10
2.	"Sky Pilot"	Eric Burdon; Vic Briggs; John Weider; Barry Jenkins; Danny McCulloch	Eric Burdon and The Animals	7:27
3.	"Soul Sacrifice"	David Brown; Marcus Malone; Gregg Rolie; Carlos Santana	Santana	6:37
4.	"Bernadette"	Holland-Dozier-Holland	Four Tops	3:00
5.	"(I Never Promised You a) Rose Garden"	Joe South	Lynn Anderson	2:55
6.	"I Want to Take You Higher"	Sly Stone	Sly and the Family Stone	5:23
7.	"Hyperbolicsyllabicsesquedalymistic"	Isaac Hayes; Alvertis Isbell	Isaac Hayes	9:38
8.	"Inner City Blues (Make Me Wanna Holler)"	Marvin Gaye; James Nyx Jr.	Marvin Gaye	5:28
9.	"Brother Louie"	Errol Brown; Tony Wilson	Stories	3:55
10.	"Hurdy Gurdy Man"	Donovan	Donovan	3:15
11.	"It's Not for Me to Say"	Robert Allen; Al Stillman	Johnny Mathis	3:06
12.	"Mary's Blues"	Pepper Adams	John Coltrane	6:47
13.	"Solar"	Miles Davis	Miles Davis	4:44
14.	"Sound of the City"	Johnny Mann	The Johnny Mann Singers	1:14
Total length:				1:06:39

== Release ==
An early version of Zodiac ran three hours and eight minutes. It was supposed to be released in time for Academy Award consideration but Paramount felt that the film ran too long and asked Fincher to make changes. Contractually, he had final cut and once he reached a length he felt was right, the director refused to make any further cuts. To trim down the film to its official runtime, he had to cut a two-minute blackout montage of "hit songs signaling the passage of time from Joni Mitchell to Donna Summer." It was replaced with a title card that reads, "Four years later." Another cut scene that test screening audiences did not like involved "three guys talking into a speakerphone" to get a search warrant as Toschi and Armstrong talk to SFPD Capt. Marty Lee (Dermot Mulroney) about their case against suspect Arthur Leigh Allen. Fincher said that this scene would probably be put back on the DVD.

To promote Zodiac, Paramount posted on light-poles in major cities original sketches of the actual Zodiac killer with the words "In theaters March 2nd" at the bottom. The film was screened in competition at the 2007 Cannes Film Festival on May 17, 2007, with Fincher and Gyllenhaal participating in a press conference afterwards. The director's cut of Zodiac was given a rare screening at the Walter Reade Theater in New York City on November 19, 2007, with Fincher being interviewed by film critic Kent Jones afterwards.

=== Home media ===
The DVD for Zodiac was released on July 24, 2007, and is available widescreen or fullscreen, presented in anamorphic widescreen, and an English Dolby Digital 5.1 Surround track. The initial DVD version of Zodiac contained only a few special features. According to producer David Prior, Fincher agreed to release it as Prior needed more time to prepare bonus material. In its first week, rentals for the DVD earned $6.7 million.

The two-disc director's cut DVD and HD DVD were released on January 8, 2008, with its UK release on Blu-ray and DVD announced for September 29, 2008. Disc 1 contains, in addition to a longer cut of the film, audio commentaries by Fincher and Gyllenhaal, Downey, Fischer, Vanderbilt, and author James Ellroy. Disc 2 includes a trailer, a "Zodiac Deciphered" documentary, previsualization split-screen comparisons for the Blue Rock Springs, Lake Berryessa, and San Francisco murder sequences, and three video features: "Visual Effects of Zodiac", "This is the Zodiac Speaking", and a "His Name Was Arthur Leigh Allen". Other extras originally intended for the set, including TV spots and featurettes on "Digital Workflow", "Linguistic Analysis", "Jeopardy Surface: Geographic Profiling" (Dr. Kim Rossmo's geographic profile of the Zodiac), and "The Psychology of Aggression: Behavioral Profiling" (Special Agent Sharon Pagaling-Hagan's behavioral profile of the Zodiac) were omitted. However, the latter three features were made available on the film's website. A 4K UHD Blu-ray of the film was released on October 29, 2024, which included the theatrical cut upscaled to 4K resolution, as well as a standard Blu-ray disc of the director's cut.

For Academy Awards contention, Paramount distributed the director's cut DVD to the Producers Guild of America, the Writers Guild of America and the Screen Actors Guild, instead of the official release version; the first time that the studio had done this.

== Reception ==
=== Box office ===
Opening in 2,362 theaters on March 2, 2007, the film grossed US$13.3 million in its opening weekend, placing second and posting a per-theater average of $5,671. The film was outgrossed by fellow opener Wild Hogs and saw a decline of over 50% in its second weekend, losing out to the record-breaking 300. It grossed $33 million in North America and $51 million in the rest of the world, bringing its current total to $84 million. In an interview with Sight & Sound magazine, Fincher addressed the film's low gross at the North American box office: "Even with the box office being what it is, I still think there's an audience out there for this movie. Everyone has a different idea about marketing, but my philosophy is that if you market a movie to 16-year-old boys and don't deliver Saw or Seven, they're going to be the most vociferous ones coming out of the screening saying 'This movie sucks.' And you're saying goodbye to the audience who would get it because they're going to look at the ads and say, 'I don't want to see some slasher movie.'"

=== Critical response ===
On review aggregator Rotten Tomatoes, the film holds an approval rating of 90% based on 264 reviews. The site's critical consensus reads: "A quiet, dialogue-driven thriller that delivers with scene after scene of gut-wrenching anxiety. David Fincher also spends more time illustrating nuances of his characters and recreating the mood of the 70s than he does on gory details of murder." At Metacritic, the film has a weighted average score of 79 out of 100, based on 40 critics, indicating "generally favorable reviews". Audiences polled by CinemaScore gave the film an average grade of "B−" on an A+ to F scale.

Entertainment Weekly critic Owen Gleiberman awarded the film an "A" grade, hailing the film as a "procedural thriller for the information age" that "spins your head in a new way, luring you into a vortex and then deeper still." Nathan Lee in his review for The Village Voice wrote that director Fincher's "very lack of pretense, coupled with a determination to get the facts down with maximum economy and objectivity, gives Zodiac its hard, bright integrity. As a crime saga, newspaper drama, and period piece, it works just fine. As an allegory of life in the information age, it blew my mind." Todd McCarthy's review in Variety magazine praised the film's "almost unerringly accurate evocation of the workaday San Francisco of 35–40 years ago. Forget the distorted emphasis on hippies and flower-power that many such films indulge in: this is the city as it was experienced by most people who lived and worked there." David Ansen, in his review for Newsweek magazine, wrote, "Zodiac is meticulously crafted – Harris Savides's state-of-the-art digital cinematography has a richness indistinguishable from film – and it runs almost two hours and 40 minutes. Still, the movie holds you in its grip from start to finish. Fincher boldly (and some may think perversely) withholds the emotional and forensic payoff we're conditioned to expect from a big studio movie." Roger Ebert gave the film a maximum of 4 stars, writing: "The film is a police procedural crossed with a newspaper movie but free of most of the cliches of either. Its most impressive accomplishment is to gather a bewildering labyrinth of facts and suspicions over a period of years and make the journey through this maze frightening and suspenseful." Ebert also praised the ensemble cast and, as a longtime columnist for The Chicago Sun-Times, asserted Zodiac was "intriguing in its accuracy" in showing the operation of a major newspaper.

Time Out magazine wrote, "Zodiac isn't a puzzle film in quite that way, instead its subject is the compulsion to solve puzzles and its coup is the creeping recognition, quite contrary to the flow of crime cinema, of how fruitless that compulsion can be." Peter Bradshaw in his review for The Guardian commended the film for its "sheer cinematic virility," and gave it four stars out of five. In his review for Empire magazine, Kim Newman gave the film 4 out of 5 stars and wrote, "You'll need patience with the film's approach, which follows its main characters by poring over details, and be prepared to put up with a couple of rote family arguments and weary cop conversations, but this gripping character study becomes more agonisingly suspenseful as it gets closer to an answer that can't be confirmed." Graham Fuller in Sight & Sound magazine wrote, "the tone is pleasingly flat and mundane, evoking the demoralising grind of police work in a pre-feminist, pre-technological era. As such, Zodiac is considerably more adult than both Seven, which salivates over the macabre cat-and-mouse game it plays with the audience, and the macho brinkmanship of Fight Club."

Some critics expressed disappointment with the film's long running time and lack of action scenes. "The film gets mired in the inevitable red tape of police investigations," wrote Bob Longino of The Atlanta Journal-Constitution, who also felt the film "stumbles to a rather unfulfilling conclusion" and "seems to last as long as the Oscars." Andrew Sarris of The New York Observer felt that "Mr. Fincher's flair for casting is the major asset of his curiously attenuated return to the serial-killer genre. I keep saying 'curiously' with regard to Mr. Fincher, because I can't really figure out what he is up to in Zodiac – with its two-hour-and-37-minute running time for what struck me as a shaggy-dog narrative." Christy Lemire wrote in the San Francisco Chronicle that "Jake Gyllenhaal is both the central figure and the weakest link... But he's never fleshed out sufficiently to make you believe that he'd sacrifice his safety and that of his family to find the truth. We are told repeatedly that the former Eagle Scout is just a genuinely good guy but that's not enough." David Thompson of The Guardian felt that in relation to the rest of Fincher's career, Zodiac was "the worst yet, a terrible disappointment in which an ingenious and deserving all-American serial killer nearly gets lost in the meandering treatment of cops and journalists obsessed with the case."

In France, Le Monde newspaper praised Fincher for having "obtained a maturity that impresses by his mastery of form", while Libération described the film as "a thriller of elegance magnificently photographed by the great Harry Savides." However, Le Figaro wrote, "No audacity, no invention, nothing but a plot which intrigues without captivating, disturbs without terrifying, interests without exciting."

==== Top ten lists ====
Only two 2007 films (No Country for Old Men and There Will Be Blood) appeared on more critics' top ten lists than Zodiac. Some of the notable top-ten list appearances are:

- 1st – Joshua Rothkopf, Time Out New York
- 1st – Desson Thomson, The Washington Post
- 2nd – Manohla Dargis, The New York Times
- 2nd – Mike Russell, The Oregonian
- 2nd – Nathan Lee, The Village Voice
- 2nd – Wesley Morris, The Boston Globe
- 3rd – Nathan Rabin, The A.V. Club
- 3rd – Scott Tobias, The A.V. Club
- 3rd – Film Comment
- 3rd – Sight & Sound
- 4th – Scott Foundas, LA Weekly
- 5th – Philip Martin, Arkansas Democrat-Gazette
- 6th – Empire
- 6th – Lisa Schwarzbaum, Entertainment Weekly
- 7th – Richard Roeper, At the Movies with Ebert & Roeper
- 7th – Glenn Kenny, Premiere
- 7th – Keith Phipps, The A.V. Club
- 9th – Marc Mohan, The Oregonian
- 9th – Noel Murray, The A.V. Club
- 9th – Andrew O'Hehir, Salon.com
- 9th – Ty Burr, The Boston Globe
- 10th – Claudia Puig, USA Today
- 10th – Liam Lacey and Rick Groen, The Globe and Mail
- 10th – Owen Gleiberman, Entertainment Weekly
- 10th – Rene Rodriguez, The Miami Herald

In the British Film Institute's 2012 Sight & Sound polls of the greatest movies ever made, three critics and one director, Bong Joon-ho, named Zodiac one of their 10 favorite films. In a 2016 critics' poll conducted by the BBC, Zodiac was ranked at 12th place in a list of the 21st century's greatest films. In 2021, members of Writers Guild of America West (WGAW) and Writers Guild of America, East (WGAE) voted its screenplay 46th in WGA’s 101 Greatest Screenplays of the 21st Century (So Far). In June 2025, the film ranked number 19 on The New York Times' list of "The 100 Best Movies of the 21st Century" and number 41 on the "Readers' Choice" edition of the list. In July 2025, it ranked number 19 on Rolling Stone's list of "The 100 Best Movies of the 21st Century."

=== Accolades ===
Organization	Category/Award	Recipient(s)	Result	Ref
Dublin Film Critics' Circle Awards	Best Director	David Fincher	Won	
Cannes Film Festival	Palme d'Or	Zodiac	Nominated	
Chicago Film Critics Association Awards	Best Director	David Fincher	Nominated	
Chicago Film Critics Association Awards	Best Screenplay – Adapted	James Vanderbilt	Nominated	
Satellite Awards	Best Supporting Actor	Brian Cox	Nominated	
Satellite Awards	Best Cinematography	Harris Savides	Nominated	
Satellite Awards	Best Adapted Screenplay	James Vanderbilt	Nominated	
Teen Choice Awards	Choice Movie Actor: Horror/Thriller	Jake Gyllenhaal	Nominated	
Toronto Film Critics Association Awards	Best Director	David Fincher	Nominated	
Toronto Film Critics Association Awards	Best Picture	Zodiac	Nominated	
World Soundtrack Awards	Best Original Soundtrack of the Year	David Shire	Nominated	
Saturn Awards	Best Action or Adventure Film	Zodiac	Nominated	
Bodil Awards	Best American Film	Zodiac	Nominated	
Empire Awards	Best Director	David Fincher	Nominated	
Empire Awards	Best Film	Zodiac	Nominated	
Empire Awards	Best Thriller	Zodiac	Nominated	
Edgar Allan Poe Awards	Best Motion Picture Screenplay	James Vanderbilt	Nominated	
Golden Trailer Awards	Best Teaser Poster	Zodiac	Nominated	
London Critics Circle Film Awards	Director of The Year	David Fincher	Nominated	
London Critics Circle Film Awards	Film of The Year	Zodiac	Nominated	
USC Scripter Award	Author	Robert Graysmith	Nominated	
USC Scripter Award	Screenwriter	James Vanderbilt	Nominated	
Visual Effects Society Awards	Outstanding Supporting Visual Effects in a Motion Picture	Zodiac	Nominated	
Visual Effects Society Awards	Outstanding Created Environment in a Live Action Motion Picture	Zodiac	Nominated	
Writers Guild of America Awards	Best Adapted Screenplay	James Vanderbilt	Nominated	

== See also ==
- List of 2007 films based on actual events
- List of films featuring psychopaths and sociopaths
- List of films based on crime books
