= Tyisha Miller =

American killed by the police (1979–1998)

- Born: March 9, 1979
- Died: December 28, 1998 (aged 19); Riverside, California
- Cause of death: Homicide by shooting

Tyisha Shenee Miller (March 9, 1979 – December 28, 1998) was an African American woman from Rubidoux, California. She was shot and killed by police officers called by family members who could not wake her as she lay unconscious in a car with a gun on her lap. The incident sparked demonstrations against police anti-blackness. The officers involved were fired from Riverside Police Department but did not face prosecution due to insufficient evidence, and were later afforded full back-pay after the decision to terminate their employment was found to be an "abuse of administrative discretion," though they were not reinstated.

== Background ==
In the early morning hours of December 28, 1998, Tyisha Miller, a 19-year-old African American woman from Rubidoux, California, was driving with her 15-year-old friend in her aunt's car when the car's tire went flat. A passing stranger helped them change the tire, but the spare was also flat, so the man led them to a gas station. The tire would not inflate, and so Miller waited in the car while the man drove her friend home to get assistance from the family.

When relatives arrived they found Miller apparently comatose in the locked car, with the engine running and the radio on. She was shaking bodily and foaming at the mouth, and had a .380 semi-automatic pistol in her lap. Unable to wake her, they called 9-1-1 and asked for an ambulance. However, four officers from the Riverside Police Department arrived at the scene within minutes and, informed by family members of the presence of a gun in the car, approached the vehicle with guns drawn. After attempting for several minutes to get a response from Miller, the decision was made to force entry into the vehicle as Miller was in apparent need of immediate medical attention. As one of the officers was attempting to remove the gun, Miller is said to have sat up and grabbed the weapon, at which point the officers opened fire 23 times, hitting Miller with at least 12 bullets, including four in the head. It was later discovered that Miller had not reached for the gun, and may have been unconscious at the time of the shooting. The police later recanted their statement of her reaching for the gun. An investigation of her death was undertaken and the officers involved, three white and one Hispanic, were placed on administrative leave. They claimed they had acted in self-defense.

In January 1999, the United States Attorney announced an investigation of the shooting would be undertaken by the FBI; at the same time protestors demanded an independent investigation, pointing out racism on the part of the police and a possible coverup of the facts.

== Protests ==
In May 1999, Riverside County District Attorney Grover Trask, said the four police officers involved had probably made an error of judgment, but had committed no crime. This sparked protests from Jesse Jackson and others, and hundreds turned out to demonstrate against the decision not to prosecute, resulting in the arrests of 46 protesters, including activist Al Sharpton and comedian Dick Gregory.

In the wake of these protests, Federal officials announced the formation of a unit of lawyers to investigate and prosecute civil rights violations, and a Federal Department of Justice investigation into Riverside Police Department, to determine if their practices and policies inherently violated civil rights. Following shortly after this announcement, the four officers involved in the incident were fired for "violating department policies", a decision that had been made several weeks before.

Toxicological reports subsequently indicated that Miller had been under the influence of the drug gamma-Hydroxybutyric acid (GHB) at the time of the shooting. In January 2002, arbitrator Robert Steinberg of Culver City found that the officers had been wrongly fired and that the decision to terminate their employment constituted an "abuse of administrative discretion". He awarded them full back-pay, but did not order them to be reinstated. In December 2002, the United States Department of Justice Civil Rights Division closed the investigation, citing insufficient evidence to prosecute the police officers.

== Dreamscape play ==
A play called Dreamscape, based on this incident, was written by Rickerby Hinds, a faculty member in the Department of Theatre at University of California, Riverside (UCR). The play has been performed around the United States as well as in Poland, Romania, Hungary, Turkey, and the UK.
