= Murder of Cheri Jo Bates =

Unsolved murder of 18-year-old woman from California, U.S. (1948–1966)

Cheri Jo Bates
- Bates in 1966
- Born: Cheri Josephine Bates; February 4, 1948; Omaha, Nebraska, U.S.
- Died: October 30, 1966 (aged 18); Riverside, California, U.S.
- Cause of death: Multiple stab wounds; severed jugular vein; homicide
- Body discovered: October 31, 1966 c. 6:28 a.m.
- Resting place: Crestlawn Memorial Park, Riverside, California, U.S. 33.9495°N 117.5170°W (approximate)
- Occupation: Student
- Height: 5 ft 3 in (1.60 m)
- Parents: Joseph Bates (father); Irene Karolevitz (mother)

The murder of Cheri Jo Bates occurred in Riverside, California, on October 30, 1966. Bates, an 18-year-old college freshman, was stabbed and slashed to death on the grounds of Riverside City College. Police determined the assailant had disabled the ignition wiring and distributor of Bates's Volkswagen Beetle as a method to lure her from her car as she studied in the college library. The murder itself remains one of Riverside's most infamous cold cases, and has been described by some locals as a murder which "stripped Riverside of its innocence".

Bates's murder was highly publicized due to both its graphically violent nature and that she is considered by some investigators to have been the first murder victim of the Zodiac Killer, although this theory has been contested by investigators. Regardless, the connection has brought attention to the cold case, though her murder remains unsolved.

== Early life ==
Cheri Josephine Bates was born in Omaha, Nebraska, on February 4, 1948. She was the younger of two children born to Joseph and Irene (née Karolevitz) Bates. The Bates family relocated to California in 1957, where her father found employment as a machinist at the Corona Naval Ordnance Laboratory. Bates was a graduate of Ramona High School, where she had been a varsity cheerleader active in the student government, and an honor student. Described as a "sweet, outgoing girl" by acquaintances, Bates aspired to become a flight attendant.

Following her graduation from Ramona High School, Bates enrolled at the Riverside City College (RCC) and found part-time employment at the Riverside National Bank. Her savings, plus wages from this part-time employment, helped pay for a 1960 lime green Volkswagen Beetle, a vehicle she was proud to own. Bates lived with her father at 4195 Via San Jose, her parents having divorced in 1965. Her mother also lived in Riverside, and her older brother, Michael, served in the United States Navy.

== Murder ==
On the morning of October 30, 1966, Bates and her father attended Sunday Mass at the St. Catherine of Alexandria Catholic Church before the two shared breakfast at a local restaurant. In the early afternoon, Bates opted to visit the college library to both study and to work on a research paper. She is known to have twice phoned a close friend named Stephanie Guttman (at 3:00 and 3:45 p.m. respectively), asking whether she would like to accompany her to the library to study and retrieve books, although on the occasion of the second phone call, Guttman refused. Bates is believed to have left her house to visit the library sometime between 4:30 and 5:00 p.m. Her father returned home in the evening to find a note taped to the family refrigerator reading: "Dad—Went to RCC Library."

Shortly before Bates left her home, she phoned a co-worker at the Riverside National Bank inquiring as to whether she had seen a term paper bibliography she (Bates) had misplaced. When her co-worker replied she had not, Bates replied: "Now I'll have to start all over on my note cards." A subsequent eyewitness report given to Riverside investigators indicated Bates drove her Beetle in the direction of RCC at approximately 6:10 p.m. This eyewitness also claimed her vehicle was closely followed by a bronze 1965 or 1966 model Oldsmobile.

According to many eyewitnesses, Bates studied in the library until the normal closing time of 9:00 p.m. A subsequent witness statement obtained from a female RCC student would claim that a young man whose age she estimated to be either 19 or 20, and approximately 5 ft 11 in (180 cm) in height, had been lurking in shadows across the street from Bates's vehicle and had been staring in the direction of her car around the same time the library closed. Although this witness did not know the individual lurking within shaded areas aside the street, as she passed him the two had exchanged brief pleasantries.

Bates's father waited the entire night for his only daughter to return home before filing a missing person report with Riverside Police Department (RPD) at 5:43 a.m. He filed this report after phoning Guttman in the early morning hours, only to be informed that his daughter was not at her residence and had intended to study at the RCC library the previous evening, having held no plans to spend the evening away from home. At approximately 6:28 a.m. on the morning of October 31, a groundskeeper named Cleophus Martin discovered Bates's body on the grounds of RCC.

== Investigation ==
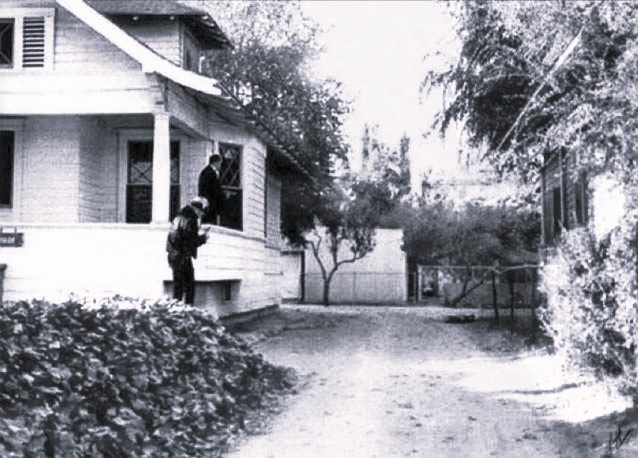
Officers from the Riverside Police Department examine the crime scene at Terracina Drive. Bates's body lies at the right of the gravel path.

=== Discovery of body ===
Bates was found sprawled face down on a gravel path between two unoccupied houses on Terracina Drive, close to the library parking lot where she had parked her Beetle the previous evening. She was still dressed in a long-sleeve pale yellow print blouse and faded red capri pants, and her woven straw bag—containing both her identification and fifty-six cents—lay alongside her body. Bates's clothing was undisturbed but was saturated in blood. She had been repeatedly stabbed in the chest and left shoulder, and suffered several deep slash wounds to her face and neck.

Ten feet from Bates's body, investigators discovered a cheap, paint-spattered Timex brand wristwatch with a seven-inch circumference along with a footprint of a shoe produced by Leavenworth prisoners sold solely in military outlets. The shoe size was between eight and ten inches. Although only 5 ft 3 in (1.60 m) in height, Bates had been an athletic woman. Both an examination of the crime scene and Bates's subsequent autopsy revealed ample evidence of a ferocious physical struggle between Bates and her murderer; she having evidently scratched her assailant's arms, face and head and torn off his wristwatch. (Note: This Timex brand wristwatch was torn at the strap immediately aside the watchface.)

Bates's Beetle was parked just 75 yards (69 m) east of the location where her body was discovered. The ignition wiring and the distributor of the vehicle had been deliberately pulled loose, but the ignition key was in place and both the driver's side and passenger windows were rolled partly down. Three library books on the subject of United States government were lying on the front seat, and several smeared, greasy palm prints and fingerprints were found upon the vehicle. Investigators would determine these prints did not belong to Bates or any of her friends or relatives, and believe they may have belonged to her murderer.

=== Autopsy ===
An autopsy revealed Bates had been repeatedly kicked in the head in addition to having suffered two stab wounds to her chest, inflicted by a knife estimated to be one-and-a-half-inches wide and three-and-a-half-inches in length. Her left cheek, upper lip, hands and arms had also been cut, with three slash wounds to her throat having severed her jugular vein and larynx and almost decapitating her. Bates had evidently lain upon the ground when she had received the knife wounds to her left shoulder blade and neck. Furthermore, she had not been subjected to any form of sexual assault or robbery within this attack. Numerous fragments of skin and brown hair were also recovered from beneath the fingernails of her right hand, having evidently been collected beneath her nails as she clawed at her murderer in a desperate effort to defend herself. The ground surrounding Bates's body was described in the official autopsy report as "looking like a freshly plowed field." The scratches Bates had inflicted to her assailant's face and/or head had evidently been sufficiently severe that he had left a trail of blood spatterings leading from the crime scene to Terracina Drive, indicating he had walked or ran in the direction of this street after killing her.

On November 4, 1966, Bates was laid to rest at the Crestlawn Memorial Park in Riverside. Her parents, older brother and several hundred other mourners were present at this service.

=== Murder scenario ===
Within twenty-four hours of Bates's murder, investigators had interviewed seventy-five individuals, including numerous RCC students, and had begun interviewing military personnel stationed at the nearby March Air Force Base. By November 6, all but two of the individuals known to have been on the RCC campus had been traced and eliminated from the inquiry. Investigators also received testimony from two separate individuals who had heard brief female screams emanating from the direction of Terracina Drive on the evening of the murder. From this, plus the conclusion of the coroner, investigators determined Bates had most likely been murdered at approximately 10:15 p.m. Investigations into her background could deduce no obvious motive for the killing, and revealed nothing which could classify her as an obvious or typical target for any form of revenge or random non-sexual violence.

Investigators theorized Bates's murderer had likely disabled her vehicle before waiting for her to return from her studying within the college library on the night of her murder; they also believed the perpetrator likely surprised Bates after she had repeatedly attempted to start her car, before offering her assistance as an initial ruse to lure her from the vehicle before proceeding to attack her within a dimly lit section of Terracina Drive partly shielded from the view of potential witnesses by domestic shrubbery. At the time of discovery, both windows of the Beetle were rolled down and the keys were still in the ignition, thus meaning she had likely been forced from her vehicle to the scene of her murder while she stood aside or sat inside her vehicle.

At the initiative of RPD Detective Sergeant David Bonine, a staged re-enactment of Bates's final hours studying within the RCC library was conducted nine days after her funeral in the hope of producing vital eyewitnesses. Present at this re-enactment were 62 students, two librarians, and one custodian who had actually been in the library on the evening of October 30; all of whom sat or stood where they had actually been on the evening in question. (Note: Although several of Bates's friends had been at the college library on October 30, none could actually recall seeing her.) All participants who owned a vehicle were asked to park their car in precisely the same spot it had been on the evening of the murder, and all participants wore the same clothing they had on the evening in question. This initiative did bring forward numerous eyewitnesses, although no fruitful leads were gained. Nonetheless, several individuals stated they had seen a tan-gray Studebaker in the close vicinity of the RCC campus on the evening of October 30. Despite extensive appeals by both investigators and the local press, the owner of this vehicle was never traced.

== Correspondence ==
"He is obsessed and pathologically preoccupied with intense hatred against female figures—all the more so if he sees the young woman as attractive. Because of his own unconscious feelings of inadequacy, he is not likely to act out his feelings sexually, but in fantasy, as a rule. The fantasy can take on aggressive aspects ... I would like to emphasize that there is a real possibility that he can become homicidal again."

— Evaluation of the mindset of the murderer of Cheri Jo Bates, written by the Chief Psychologist of Patton State Hospital. July 1967.

One month after Bates's murder, on November 29, two identical type-written letters arrived at RPD headquarters and the editorial offices of the Riverside Press-Enterprise. The author of these letters described a likely scenario as to how Bates had been lured from her vehicle and subsequently murdered. This author described in detail how he had first disabled Bates's car before allegedly watching her repeatedly attempt to switch on the ignition until the vehicle battery had drained of power. He had then offered her assistance, claiming his own vehicle was further down the street; thus luring her away from her vehicle. According to the author of this letter, after the two had walked a short distance from her car, he had stated to her, "It's about time." Bates had replied, "About time for what?" to which he had simply replied, "About time for you to die." According to the author, he had then clasped his hand over her mouth and pressed a knife against her neck before forcing her to walk to a dimly lit alley where he had proceeded to beat and kick Bates in their initial struggle before stabbing and slashing her to death.

The author of these letters claimed to have known his victim, proclaiming: "Only one thing was on my mind: Making her pay for the brush-offs that she had given me during the years prior." Due to the fact the letter included details of the murder which had not been released to the press—including the specific ways that Bates's vehicle had been disabled—investigators initially believed that the author of the letter may have been the actual murderer.

On April 30, 1967, the Press-Enterprise printed a further update on Bates's murder. The following day, both the RPD and Bates's father received handwritten letters from an unknown individual, who had scrawled the message, "Bates had to die. There will be more" on a single sheet of paper. This letter was considered by police to have been a distasteful hoax, although at the bottom of each letter was an indecipherable number or letter which was either a "2" or a "Z."

== Potential link to Zodiac Killer ==
"I have personally spoken to the previous detectives [assigned to] the case, and they genuinely believe that the Cheri Jo Bates case is not related to the Zodiac murders .. they believe it was an acquaintance of [hers], or a scorned love interest."

— Detective Jim Simons. Current investigator assigned to the unsolved murder of Cheri Jo Bates. November 2013.

It has been hypothesized that Bates may have been an early victim—perhaps even the first—of an unidentified serial killer active in Northern California from the late 1960s to the early 1970s known as the Zodiac Killer, and that this unidentified individual may have originated from Riverside and later moved to the San Francisco Bay Area.

One of the potential clues supporting this theory was the discovery of a macabre poem scratched into the underside of a foldable desk in the RCC library. This poem was discovered by a custodian six months after the murder and contains graphic references to repeated assaults upon young women with a bladed weapon. Titled "Sick of living/unwilling to die", the poem's language and handwriting resembled that of the Zodiac's letters. It was signed with what were assumed to be a set of lower case initials (r h). (Note: In 1970, handwriting expert Sherwood Morrill stated his belief this poem was written by Zodiac Killer.) The desk in question was in the college storage area at the time the poem was discovered, although the custodian informed police the desk had been on the library floor at the time of Bates's murder. Police photographed the inscription and added this piece of circumstantial evidence to the case file.

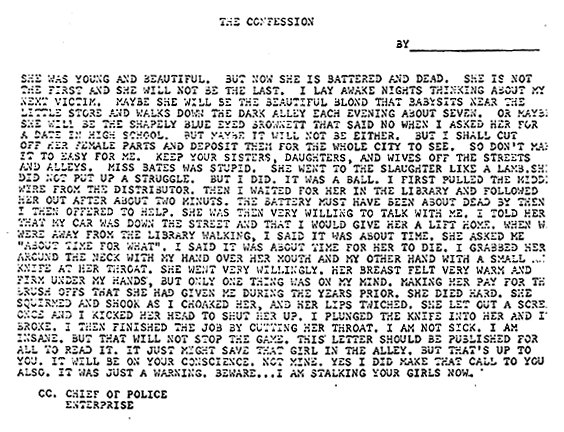
The typewritten confession received by the Riverside Police Department and The Press-Enterprise on November 29, 1966

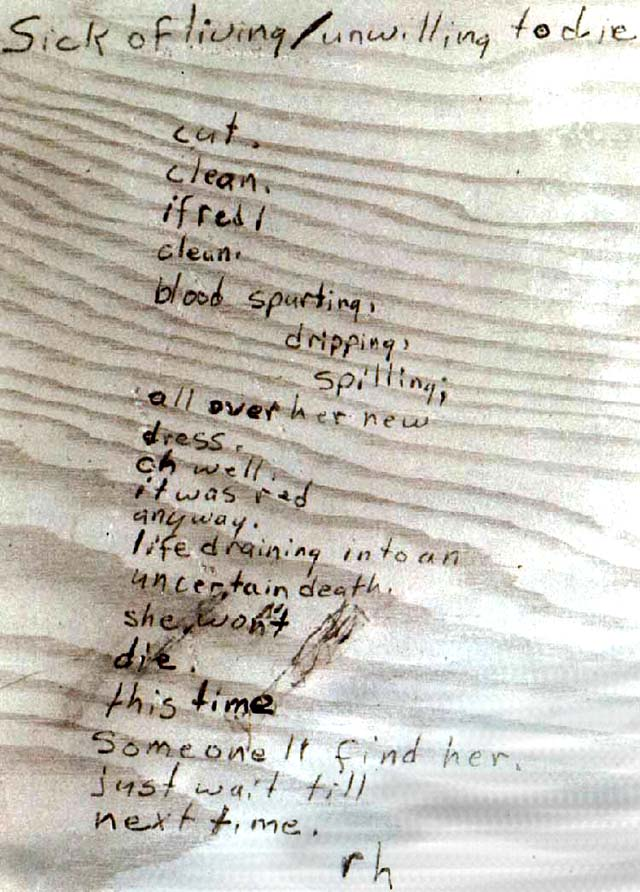
The inscription upon the Riverside City College library desk, discovered in 1967

Furthermore, the fact that the perpetrator subsequently sent correspondence to the police and press, including details of the murder withheld from the public, is reminiscent of the Zodiac. In addition, the RPD have noted similarities between Bates's murder and the general modus operandi of a fatal attack upon a young couple committed at Lake Berryessa in September 1969—an attack conclusively ascribed to the Zodiac.

San Francisco Chronicle journalist Paul Avery followed the Zodiac murders from the date of the perpetrator's first definite killings. In November 1970, Avery received a letter from an anonymous source informing him of the similarities between the murders committed by the Zodiac and the murder of Bates four years previously. The letter urged Avery to investigate the similarities in greater detail. Although the RPD remained unconvinced of his conclusions, both Avery and a handwriting expert named Sherwood Morrill stated on November 16 that the handwriting scratched on the desk at RCC and the letters sent to the Press-Enterprise and Bates's father in 1967 were "unquestionably" written by the same individual who had later written the Zodiac letters. By this date, the Zodiac claimed to have killed fourteen victims, although only five murders and two attempted murders committed between December 1968 and October 1969 have ever been conclusively attributed to this individual. (Note: In 1978, the Director of Postal Crime Laboratory analyzed the handwriting scratched upon the desk at RCC and all letters sent by the individual purporting to have murdered Bates. This expert came to the conclusion that the Zodiac did not author any of this material.)

In a letter dated March 13, 1971, the Zodiac claimed to the Los Angeles Times that he was responsible for the murder of Bates, stating: "I do have to give [the police] credit for stumbling across my Riverside activity, but they are only finding the easy ones. There are a hell of a lot more down there." (Note: Although the Zodiac would claim responsibility for the murder of Bates in this 1971 letter, authorities have never officially linked her murder to those known to have been committed by him.)

=== Alternative theories ===
Former Los Angeles police investigator Steve Hodel, in his book Most Evil, has claimed that his father, George Hodel, was responsible for the murder of Bates. This claim has been viewed with little credibility, not least because—among other cases—Hodel has also claimed that his father was the Zodiac, the Lipstick Killer, and the perpetrator of the 1947 murder of the Black Dahlia.

=== Later developments ===
In August 2021, the RPD's cold case unit published an update regarding the handwritten correspondence, stating that the author of the letters claiming responsibility for Bates's murder had been identified via DNA analysis in 2020, and had admitted to writing the correspondence. According to the update, the author had initially—and anonymously—contacted investigators in 2016, explaining the correspondence had been a distasteful hoax. This individual expressed remorse and apologized for the hoax, saying that he had been a troubled teenager at the time and that he had written and mailed the letters as a means of seeking attention.

In October 2021, a group of retired police officers, intelligence officers and journalists claimed to have solved Bates's murder, which they claimed was linked to the Zodiac murders and that the perpetrator in both cases was a man named Gary Francis Poste. Among the evidence cited as the basis for their claims was the fact that Poste was a painter by profession, which would explain the paint-spattering upon the Timex watch found at the crime scene; that Poste was receiving medical treatment at March Air Force Base for an "accidental" gunshot wound at around the time of Bates's death; that this location was fifteen minutes from the site of Bates's murder; and that Poste had brown hair, which could be a match for the hair found under Bates's fingernails.

This theory was met with skepticism from the RPD. According to the online newspaper TMZ, the group claimed the RPD had refused their requests to submit samples of the hair found beneath Bates's fingernails to DNA testing; however, the RPD has denied any such request has been received. The RPD maintain that there is no evidence linking Bates killing to the later Zodiac murders and that they strongly believe her murderer was native to Riverside County.

== Aftermath ==
Officially, Bates's murder remains an unsolved case. The theory she was a victim of the Zodiac has never been conclusively proven and is strongly rejected by RPD officials. Despite several suspects having been investigated and eliminated from the inquiry since 1966, the current investigator assigned to the case, Detective Jim Simons, has stated one individual still remains of interest to the investigation, although because tests conducted upon the mitochondrial DNA of the hair and blood samples found at the crime scene did not match those of this suspect, insufficient physical evidence exists to link this individual to the crime. (Note: Investigators have stated they cannot state with complete certainty the hair samples retrieved from beneath Bates's fingernails actually belonged to her murderer.) Investigators who conducted DNA profiling were, however, able to determine that her murderer was a Caucasian male.

A 2016 Press-Enterprise article reported that the RPD strongly believe they know the identity of Bates's murderer, but were never able to obtain sufficient evidence to arrest and charge this individual.

Following the murder, Bates's family established a memorial scholarship at RCC. This scholarship, entitled The Cheri Jo Bates Memorial Endowed Scholarship, is awarded to a student active in various school projects and initiatives, who demonstrates financial needs, undertakes volunteer work and who majors in music with at least a B grade average.

Bates's mother, Irene, died of strychnine poisoning in early July 1969.

== See also ==
- Cold case
- Crime in California
- List of unsolved murders (1900–1979)

== Cited works and further reading ==
- Douglas, John; Olshaker, Mark (2012). The Cases That Haunt Us. New York: Scribner. ISBN 978-0-743-21239-7.
- Dunning, John (1987). Mindless Murders. London: Mulberry Editions. ISBN 978-1-873-12333-1.
- Flaherty, Thomas H. (1993). True Crime: Unsolved Crimes. Time Life Education. ISBN 978-0-783-50012-6.
- Godwin, George (1993). Zodiac. Alexandra, Virginia: Time-Life Books. pp. 5–47. ISBN 0-783-50012-2.
- Graysmith, Robert (2007a). Zodiac Unmasked: The Identity of America's Most Elusive Serial Killers Revealed. New York: Berkley Books. ISBN 978-1-440-67812-7.
- Graysmith, Robert (2007b). Zodiac: The Shocking Story of America's Most Elusive Serial Killer. London: Titan Books. ISBN 978-1-845-76531-6.
- Haugen, Brenda (2011). The Zodiac Killer: Terror and Mystery. Capstone Press. ISBN 978-0-7565-4357-0.
- Hodel, Steve; Pezzullo, Ralph (2010). Avenger, Zodiac, and the Further Serial Murders of Dr. George Hill Hodel. Waterville, Maine: Thorndike Press. ISBN 978-1-410-42234-7.
- Holmes, Ronald M.; Holmes, Stephen T. (2002). Profiling Violent Crimes: An Investigative Tool. Los Angeles: Sage Publications. ISBN 978-0-761-92594-1.
- Katz, Hélèna (2010). Cold Cases: Famous Unsolved Mysteries, Crimes, and Disappearances in America. Santa Barbara: Greenwood Publishing Group. ISBN 978-0-313-37692-4.
- Korsgaard, Søren Roest (2017). America's Jack The Ripper: The Crimes and Psychology of the Zodiac Killer. Morrisville, North Carolina: lulu.com. ISBN 978-1-365-88573-0.
- Lafferty, Lyndon E. (2012). The Zodiac Killer Cover-Up: The Silenced Badge. Mandamus. ISBN 9780982936306.
- Lloyd, Georgina (1993) [1986]. One Was Not Enough. Reading, Berkshire: Bantam Books. pp. 176–181. ISBN 0-553-17605-6.
- Newton, Michael (2004), The Encyclopedia of Unsolved Crimes, Checkmark Books, ISBN 0-816-04980-7
- Penn, Gareth (1987), Times 17: The Amazing Story of the Zodiac Murders in California and Massachusetts, 1966–1981, Foxglove Press, ISBN 978-0-961-84940-5
- Rodelli, Mike (2017), The Hunt for Zodiac: The Inconceivable Double Life of a Notorious Serial Killer, Changing Lives Press, ISBN 978-0-998-62317-7
- Rogers, Kate (2017), The Zodiac Killer: Terror in California, Greenhaven Publishing, ISBN 978-0-961-84940-5
- Sherwood, Derek (2011). Who Killed Betsy?: Uncovering Penn State University's Most Notorious Unsolved Crime. New York: Pine Grove Press. ISBN 978-0-615-49811-9.
- Shkrum, Michael J.; Ramsay, David A. (2007). Forensic Pathology of Trauma. New Jersey: Humana Press. ISBN 978-1-588-29458-6.
- Stewart, Gary L.; Mustafa, Susan D. (2014). The Most Dangerous Animal of All. Glasgow: HarperCollins. ISBN 978-0-007-57981-5.
