= Zodiac (true crime book) =

1986 non-fiction book by Robert Graysmith

- Book cover
- Author: Robert Graysmith
- Language: English
- Genre: True crime
- Published: 1986 (St. Martin's Press)
- Publication place: United States
- ISBN: 0-312-89895-9
- OCLC: 12133242
- Dewey Decimal: 364.1/523/0979461 19
- LC Class: HV6534.S3 G7 1986

Zodiac is a non-fiction book written by Robert Graysmith about the unsolved serial murders committed by the Zodiac Killer in San Francisco in the late 1960s and early 1970s. Since its initial release in 1986, Zodiac has sold 4 million copies worldwide. Graysmith was a cartoonist for the San Francisco Chronicle and later also wrote Zodiac Unmasked.

== Synopsis ==
This book chronicles the history of the self-named Zodiac Killer who was active in the 1960s and 1970s in California from first hand details covered by Graysmith's investigative efforts to unmask the Zodiac. The book describes the investigations of the many law enforcement branches such as the LAPD, the FBI, the CIA, etc., that worked on the case and other murders that the Zodiac had proclaimed he committed, including the 1966 Cheri Jo Bates stabbing. Later chapters deal with Graysmith's many theories on the case, and the book eventually cites two possible suspects (who are given pseudonyms), Bob Starr and Donald Andrews, and details some of the circumstantial evidence against them. Graysmith received assistance from police departments that fell within the jurisdictions of the murders, and especially from Inspector Dave Toschi from the San Francisco Police Department, who had worked the Zodiac case. Although the case was never solved, there were instances where solid evidence was held among a number of suspects, even after the Zodiac murders had stopped.

== Background ==
Graysmith was a cartoonist working for the San Francisco Chronicle in the 1960s when the Zodiac murders started. The Zodiac sent letters to the Chronicle, which he urgently wanted published in the paper. The letters included evidence that he was in fact the Zodiac; while committing one of his crimes, the Zodiac cut a piece of bloody cloth from one of his victims and attached scraps of it to several of his handwritten letters. Graysmith saw the letters arriving at the Chronicle and became intrigued. For years, the cartoonist kept his own scrapbook of evidence, from which he independently attempted to determine the Zodiac's identity. When asked why he began working on the book, Graysmith replied, "I saw it going into obscurity. Nobody is sharing all the different jurisdictions, and all this information. What if I as a private citizen went around and got all this information?" This led to a 10-year period to collect information, and eventually the book was published in 1986 after a number of delays.

== Film ==
The film adaptation Zodiac (2007) is roughly based on Graysmith's books, Zodiac (1986) and Zodiac Unmasked (2002). The film follows the work of Graysmith as a cartoonist in 1969 aiding the authorities in figuring out the identity of the infamous Zodiac Killer.
