= Riverside Police Department =

Police agency of Riverside, California

Riverside Police Department (RPD)
- Common name: Riverside PD
- Abbreviation: RPD

Jurisdictional structure
- Operations jurisdiction: City of Riverside, California

Operational structure
- Headquarters: 4102 Orange Street, Riverside, CA 92501
- Chief responsible: Larry V. Gonzalez

Facilities
- Detention Centers: 1

Website
- Riverside Police Department

The Riverside Police Department (RPD) is an American law enforcement agency that serves as the primary civilian police for the city of Riverside, California. The current department head is Larry DB Gonzalez.

== History ==
The Riverside Police Department was founded in 1896, growing from a small frontier town police force to a large metropolitan police department with over 409 sworn police employees and 200 civilian employees. The Riverside PD has provided training materials to police academies and other law enforcement agencies across the country. For example, the current method of initiating a traffic stop on a high-risk offender in a moving vehicle, known in law enforcement as a "felony traffic stop", was first put into use by Riverside officers. This safety technique spread throughout the police profession, with nearly all law enforcement agencies in the nation using it.

In 2010, Sergio G. Diaz was sworn in as the new Chief of Police, replacing former Chief Russ Leach, who left after a drunken driving incident.

In 2020, police chief Larry Gonzalez was named as the next police chief of Riverside after the former chief Sergio G. Diaz announced his retirement in September 2019.

== Controversy ==
In 1998, a woman named Tyisha Miller was found by her relatives unconscious and foaming at the mouth in a locked car, with a gun on her lap. Her relatives called 911 and four Riverside Police officers arrived. An officer forced his way into the car and attempted to remove the weapon. The officers claimed that Miller sat up and grabbed the weapon, at which point the officers opened fire, hitting her with at least 12 shots. Later, it was not proven that Miller had reached for the gun and it was suggested she may have still been unconscious at the time. The United States Attorney announced an investigation of the shooting; ultimately, the officers were fired but not prosecuted.

In 2006, a black police officer was awarded 1.6 million USD in a discrimination lawsuit against the RPD after being subject of harassment and racial discrimination by his colleagues. The lawsuit displayed many patterns of harassment to the officer. The court ruled in his favor.

== Organization ==
The RPD is situated in several police buildings. The downtown headquarters building houses the Office of the Chief of Police, Community Services Bureau, Administrative Division (Personnel), Records Bureau, Communications Bureau, and the Emergency Operations Center.

The Field Operations Division includes Patrol, the Traffic Services Bureau, and Vehicular Homicide Unit, and is located at the Lincoln Police Station (8181 Lincoln Ave). The Internal Affairs, General Investigations, and Special Investigations offices are located in the Magnolia Police Station (10540 Magnolia Avenue).

- Chief of Police - Larry Gonzalez
  - Chief's Adjutant - Lieutenant
  - Administration - Deputy Chief of Police
    - Administrative Services Division - Administrative Coordinator (Equivalent of a Captain)
      - Office of Accounting & Budget - Civilian Manager (Equivalent of a Lieutenant)
      - Office of Asset Forfeiture & Payroll - Civilian Manager
      - Office of Contracts/Special Projects - Civilian Manager
    - Community Engagement Division - Captain
      - CED Central Area - Lieutenant
      - CED East Area - Lieutenant
      - CED North Area - Lieutenant
      - CED West Area - Lieutenant
    - Support Services Division - Captain
      - Community Services Bureau - Lieutenant
        - Citizen Academy - Sergeant
        - Youth Court Program - Field Training Officer
        - Citizen's Patrol Program - Civilian Employee
      - Internal Affairs Bureau - Lieutenant
      - Personnel & Training Bureau - Lieutenant
      - Communications Bureau - Lieutenant
      - Records Bureau - Lieutenant
      - Training Bureau - Lieutenant
      - Dispatch Bureau - Lieutenant
  - Operations - Deputy Chief of Police
    - Investigations Division - Captain
      - Centralized Investigations Bureau - Lieutenant
      - Specialized Investigations Bureau - Lieutenant
    - Field Operations Division - Captain
      - Office of the Executive Lieutenant - Lieutenant
      - Traffic Bureau - Lieutenant
      - Watch Commander - Lieutenant
      - Vehicular Homicide Team - Lieutenant

== Rank structure ==
The rank structure of the RPD as it follows.

Rank structure of the Riverside Police Department
Title of the Rank	Insignia	Description of insignia	Information
Chief of Police		4 golden stars	Chief of the department; Appointed by the city manager
Deputy Chief of Police		2 golden stars	Administration commander; Operations commander
Captain		2 gold bars	Division commander
Lieutenant		1 gold bar	Bureau commander; Watch commander
Sergeant		3 chevrons	Patrol supervisor
Detective		2 chevrons and an arc	Investigative Unit
Field Training Officer		2 chevrons	Senior Lead Officer
Police Officer	No Insignia		Baseline officer rank

== Leadership ==
Chief	Name
Chief of Police	Larry Gonzalez
Deputy Chief - Administration	Bruce Blomdahl
Deputy Chief - Operations	Frank Assumma
