= Dave Toschi =

American police detective (1931–2018)

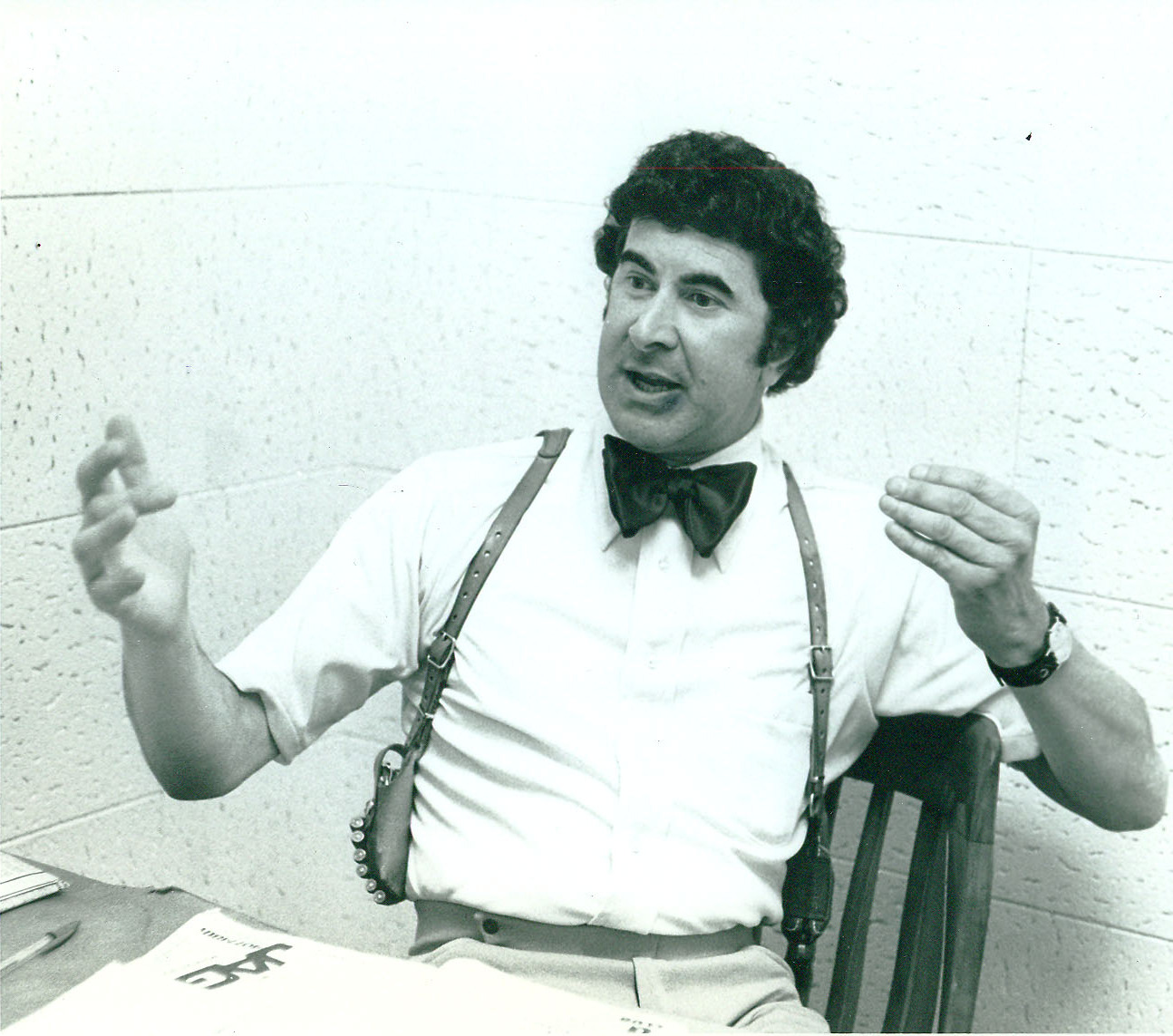
- Toschi in 1976
- Born: David Ramon Toschi; July 11, 1931; San Francisco, California, U.S.
- Died: January 6, 2018 (aged 86); San Francisco, California, U.S.
- Education: Galileo High School
- Occupation: Inspector (1952–1989)
- Known for: The Zodiac Killer case
- Spouse: Carol Bacigalupi (m. 1957)

David Ramon Toschi (/ˈtɒski/ TOSS-kee; July 11, 1931 – January 6, 2018) was an American law enforcement officer widely known for his efforts in the San Francisco Police Department as an inspector in the Zodiac Killer case. His personal style was the model for the characters of Frank Bullitt and Harry Callahan.

== Biography ==
Toschi, an Italian-American, was born to the family of school janitor Sam and Millie Toschi in San Francisco and was an alumnus of Galileo High School. Immediately upon graduation, he joined the US Army, and became a member of the 24th Infantry Division, holding the Pusan Perimeter during the Korean War, honorably discharged in 1952.

Returning to San Francisco, Toschi joined the San Francisco Police Department, where he served from 1953 to 1985. He was assigned to its homicide division from 1966 to 1978. He is best known for his role as a chief investigator in the Zodiac Killer case, which he and his partner, Inspector Bill Armstrong, began to work on after the murder of taxi driver Paul Stine. He was also assigned to the Zebra murders team, and in 1985 received a meritorious conduct award for curtailing the career of a rapist/burglar. Toschi was well known for his style of dress, including bow-ties, 'loud' plaid suits, bounteous curls, and exaggerated trench-coat at a time when investigating officers strove to look subdued "like G-men". In 1976, he sent anonymous letters admiring his own efforts to Armistead Maupin, then a writer for the San Francisco Chronicle; the revelation of that led to him being removed from the Zodiac case in 1978 and being reassigned to the robbery detail. Toschi was also accused but later exonerated of writing one of the Zodiac letters, which the USPS crime lab verified as authentic but was later impeached by other experts; these suspicions ended Toschi's chance of eventually replacing SFPD chief Charles Gain.

Shortly after he left the SFPD, Toschi became Director of Security for St. Luke's Hospital in San Francisco's Mission District, and later served the same role for San Francisco's Pan Pacific Hotel. Toschi was vice president of North Star Security Services in Daly City. He was a technical advisor to the producers of the 2007 film Zodiac.

Toschi married Carol Bacigalupi in 1957. They had three daughters, Susan, Karen, and Linda. During production of Zodiac, his family refused to be present or referenced in the film, though his wife was portrayed in the film by June Diane Raphael.

== In popular culture ==
Harry Callahan, the title character of the 1971 film Dirty Harry portrayed by Clint Eastwood, was said to have been modeled on Toschi, while the film's villain "Scorpio" was based on the Zodiac Killer. Steve McQueen specifically copied Toschi's distinctive style of quick-draw shoulder-holster (wearing his gun upside down) for the 1968 movie Bullitt. McQueen also claimed that he modeled much of his Bullitt character on Toschi. San Francisco Chronicle crime reporter Duffy Jennings, however, wrote that while the film characters drew their swagger and style from Toschi's personal character, his professional style "was by the book, efficient and thorough."

Actor Mark Ruffalo portrayed Toschi in the 2007 David Fincher film Zodiac. In the film, Paul Avery makes an allusion to Toschi’s cultural impact by calling him "Bullitt;" later, Toschi makes a reference to Dirty Harry when speaking with Robert Graysmith.

George Lucas included a subtle tribute in the 1977 film Star Wars, having Luke Skywalker "going into Tosche Station to pick up some power converters".
