= Robert Graysmith =

American writer (born 1942)

- Born: Robert Gray Smith; September 17, 1942 (age 84); Pensacola, Florida, U.S.
- Occupations: Author, cartoonist
- Notable work: Zodiac (1986)
- Spouses: Margaret Ann Womack (m. 1963; div. 1973) Melanie Krakower (m. 1975; div. 1980)

Robert Graysmith (born Robert Gray Smith; September 17, 1942) is an American true crime author and former cartoonist, known for authoring the 1986 book Zodiac, based on his work on the Zodiac Killer case.

== Career ==
Graysmith worked as a political cartoonist for the San Francisco Chronicle in 1969, when the Zodiac Killer case came to prominence. He attempted to decode letters written by the killer and became obsessed with the case over the next 13 years. Graysmith wrote two books about the case; his 1986 book Zodiac was the basis for the 2007 film by the same name. He eventually gave up his career as a cartoonist to write five more books on high-profile crimes, one of which became the basis for the film Auto Focus (2002).

== Personal life ==
Graysmith was married to Margaret Ann Womack, a nurse, from 1963 to 1973. He then married Melanie Krakower in 1975, but they divorced in 1980. He directly attributes his failed marriages to his intense interest in the Zodiac case.

== In popular culture ==
The film Zodiac (2007), directed by David Fincher, was based on his books and featured Jake Gyllenhaal as Graysmith.

== Bibliography ==
- Zodiac. New York: St. Martin's Press. 1986. ISBN 978-0-312-89895-3.
- The Sleeping Lady: the trailside murders above the Golden Gate. New York: Onyx. 1990. ISBN 978-0-451-40255-4.
- The Murder of Bob Crane: who killed the star of Hogan's Heroes?. New York: Crown Publishers. 1993. ISBN 978-0-517-59209-0.
- Unabomber: a desire to kill. Washington, D.C.: Regnery. 1997. ISBN 9780895263971.
- The Bell Tower: the case of Jack the Ripper finally solved. Washington, D.C.: Regnery. 1999. ISBN 978-0-89526-324-7.
- Ghostfleet. Washington, D.C.: Regnery. 1999. ISBN 978-0-89526-271-4.
- Zodiac Unmasked: the identity of America's most elusive serial killer revealed. New York: Berkley Books. 2002. ISBN 978-0-425-18332-8.
- Amerithrax: the hunt for the anthrax killer. New York: Berkley Books. 2003. ISBN 978-0-425-19190-3.
- The Laughing Gorilla: a true story of police corruption and murder. New York: Berkley Books. 2009. ISBN 978-0-425-23014-5.
- The Girl in Alfred Hitchcock's Shower. New York: Berkley Books. 2010. ISBN 978-0-425-23231-6.
- Black Fire: the true story of the original Tom Sawyer. New York: Crown Publishers. 2012. ISBN 978-0-307-72056-6.
- Shooting Zodiac. Los Angeles: Monkey's Paw Publishing, Inc. 2021. ISBN 978-1-73658-005-9.
