= Zodiac Killer in popular culture =

The crosshair-like symbol used by the Zodiac Killer in signing his correspondence

The Zodiac Killer was a serial killer who operated in Northern California from at least the late 1960s to the early 1970s. His identity remains unknown. His crimes, letters and cryptograms to police and newspapers inspired many movies, novels, television and more.

This article's list focuses on entertainment ("popular culture") inspired by the events, with a few references to documentary and true crime media.

== Film ==
- The Zodiac Killer (1971), released while the killer was still active, was directed by Tom Hanson and starred Hal Reed and Bob Jones.
- Zodiac Rapist (1971), a pornographic horror film loosely based on the crimes directed by John Lamb with John Holmes in the leading role.
- Dirty Harry (1971), released while the killer was still active, was loosely based on the Zodiac case, featuring a serial killer who calls himself "Scorpio" (a sign in the Zodiac), who at one point kidnaps a school bus full of children, mirroring the real Zodiac's threat to shoot children on a school bus.
- The Exorcist III (1990) has a character named the "Gemini Killer", loosely based on the Zodiac Killer.
- The Limbic Region (1996), a thriller about a San Francisco inspector (played by Edward James Olmos) obsessed with catching a man he believes is "The Scorekeeper," a serial killer who committed murders in the 1970s and sent taunting letters to the police and media after each crime. Although the story is fictional, many of the killings and other events depicted in the film mirror those of the Zodiac Killer's case.
- Disguised Killer (2000), a short film filmed in Vallejo and set in the present, is based on the Lake Herman Road murders.
- Zodiac Killer (2005) is set in the present. The film, written and directed by Ulli Lommel, features a nursing home employee who begins copycatting the Zodiac, angering the original killer (played by Lommel), who is revealed to be a member of a moralistic secret society, and who has been living under the guise of Zodiac expert Simon Vale.
- The Zodiac (2005) focuses on telling the story of a Vallejo detective involved in the case, and how it affected him and his family.
- Curse of the Zodiac (2007) is a loose retelling of the original murders, also written and directed by Ulli Lommel.
- Zodiac (2007) is based on the two non-fiction books by Robert Graysmith: Zodiac and Zodiac Unmasked: The Identity of America's Most Elusive Serial Killer. Filming locations included San Francisco and Los Angeles.
- Seven Psychopaths (2012) has the Zodiac Killer make a brief appearance in a flashback, presented as a hippy who lives with a number of white rabbits and displays a Gandhi poster on his wall.
- Awakening the Zodiac (2017) stars Shane West and Leslie Bibb as a nearly destitute couple, who find a 50-year-old 8 mm film reel showing murders by the Zodiac Killer, leading them to try to solve the case (rather than contact the police) so that they might make some money.
- The Batman (2022) features a version of the Riddler based on the Zodiac Killer with a similar costume, symbol, and use of a Halloween greeting card to taunt an individual.

== Music ==
- The death metal band Macabre's album "Sinister Slaughter", from 1993, features a song entitled "Zodiac", about the killer.
- The bottom of the cover art of Guns N' Roses' album "The Spaghetti Incident?", from 1993, contains a code using the killer's symbols, which has been deciphered as "fuck'em all".
- San Francisco metal band Machine Head's 1997 album The More Things Change... features "Blood of the Zodiac", inspired by the Zodiac killer.
- The Zodiac Killers, a San Francisco-based punk rock band has drawn imagery and words from the killer for the albums "The Most Thrilling Experience" "Have a Blast", and "Society's Offenders".
- The Japanese horror punk band Balzac have a side project band, founded in 2004, consisting of the same band members that is called Zodiac. Their lyrics make frequent references to the Zodiac Killer's actions.
- German EBM band SAM 2008 album "Synthetic Adrenaline Music" features a track called "Zodiac Killer".
- Kamelot's album Poetry for the Poisoned, from 2010, features two songs, "Dear Editor" and "The Zodiac", about the Zodiac Killer.
- The song "National Disgrace" by Atmosphere contains a reference to The Zodiac Killer.
- Japanese doom metal band Church of Misery wrote a song about the Zodiac in 2013 entitled "Sick of Living", quoting Zodiac's cryptic nature and the infamous piece of poetry carved under the desktop in the Riverside City College library.
- American deathrock band Christian Death's 2000 album Born-Again Antichristian features a track called "Zodiac (He Is Still Out There...)", about the Zodiac Killer.
- The Grateful Dead song "Dire Wolf", from 1969, written by lyricist Robert Hunter and guitarist Jerry Garcia, contains the refrain "Don't murder me...I beg of you, don't murder me..." which was inspired by the air of paranoia that settled over the San Francisco area during the peak period of the Zodiac murders.

== Television ==
- The season 2 episode of Nash Bridges, titled "Zodiac", has the inspectors following a copycat using the same methodologies as the original killer. At the end of the episode, Nash receives a taunting cell phone call from someone claiming to be the real Zodiac.
- The Zodiac case forms the basis for "The Mikado", a second season installment of the television series Millennium. The episode, featuring a fictionalized version of the Zodiac Killer known as Avatar, was written by Michael R. Perry and first aired on February 6, 1998.
- The show Psych has a recurring serial killer/killers "Yin/Yang", whose crimes bear similarity to the Zodiac Killer's, played by Ally Sheedy.
- The series Heroes character Sylar, portrayed by Zachary Quinto, is loosely based upon the Zodiac Killer. Sylar taking his name from a watch mirrors one theory regarding the Zodiac Killer. One suspect was allegedly given a "Zodiac" brand watch that had the same logo (a crossed circle) that the killer used to sign his letters. Also of note, before one alleged victim died, she was followed by a suspicious man wearing horn-rimmed glasses.
- A Season 6 episode of Medium, entitled "The Medium is the Message", portrayed a killer called "The Libra Slayer" who showed a proclivity for symbols. His case was decades old, much like the Zodiac Killer's.
- The Zodiac Killer is mentioned numerous times in Criminal Minds, a television program which follows a team of profilers at the FBI's Behavioral Analysis Unit. On January 18, 2012, the episode "True Genius" was aired, featuring a Zodiac Killer copycat active in the Bay Area. Recurring villain George Foyet, a.k.a. "The Boston Reaper", was heavily based on the Zodiac.
- In the American Horror Story series, the Zodiac Killer is depicted as a masked figure and first appears as a ghost in the American Horror Story: Hotel episode "Devil's Night", attending James Patrick March's dead serial killer party while apologizing for being late from "writing some letters". In American Horror Story: Cult, the Zodiac Killer is suggested to be a member of Valerie Solanas' SCUM cult and that the "Zodiac Killer" was coined by a homosexual member who took credit for the series murders and sent the infamous cryptic letters to the police.
- The "Magnifying Glass" episode of the MacGyver reboot (original air date 02/10/17) features the team tracking down a Zodiac Killer copycat.
- The episode "Chapter Seventeen: The Town That Dreaded Sundown" from the second season of Riverdale features a Zodiac copycat killer called the "Black Hood" killer, who like Zodiac sends taunting letters and cryptograms.
- Myth of the Zodiac Killer is a 2-part documentary series released by Peacock. It explores the theory that there never was a Zodiac Killer.
- This Is the Zodiac Speaking is a 3-part 2024 Netflix documentary, directed by Ari Mark and Phil Lott, that points to Arthur Leigh Allen as The Zodiac Killer.
- The Zodiac Killer appears in the Robot Chicken episode "May Cause Season 11 to End" where he's shown advertising his own breakfast cereal called "Z-Oh-Diacs!"
- "Samaritan," the seventeenth episode of the second season of the TV series Lou Grant has the newspaper staff investigating several attacks attributed to the so-called "Samaritan Killer," who resembles Zodiac. The attacks turn out to be the responsibility of a retired journalist obsessed with the Samaritan case.

== Video games ==
- In the 2007 video game Manhunt 2, the player character Daniel Lamb is modeled after the Zodiac Killer's composite sketch.
- The main antagonist of 2010's Cause of Death volume 4, "Zero", is largely inspired by the Zodiac Killer.
- Watch Dogs 2 features a pre-order mission where the protagonist Marcus Holloway has to find a Zodiac Killer copycat and solve his mystery.
- Zodiac is a passive item added in the Binding of Isaac: Afterbirth expansion, represented by the crosshair symbol.
- In the 2017 game Serial Cleaner, one of the levels the protagonist has to remove evidence from is based on the killings.
- The 2020 video game This Is the Zodiac Speaking revolves around journalist Robert Hartnell as he undergoes therapy after he survives an encounter with the Zodiac. Whilst undergoing it, he visits the Zodiac's crime scenes through his dreams and attempts to piece together the timeline of events of each murder case. The game's protagonist is based on Bryan Hartnell, who survived eight stab wounds to the back from the Zodiac Killer.
- In the 2026 game, Mewgenics, the boss "Zodiac", is largely inspired by the Zodiac Killer.

== Literature ==
- The California Crime Book, "Horror-Scope for Murder (The Zodiac Killer)", (1971) by Robert Colby.
- Great Crimes of San Francisco: True Tales of Intrigue by the Bay, "This is the Zodiac Speaking...", (1974) by Duffy Jennings.
- Great Unsolved Mysteries, "Zodiac-The Sign of Death", a 1978 novel by James Purvis.
- The Zodiac Killer, a 1979 novel by Jerry Weissman.
- Zodiac: The Shocking True Story of the Hunt for the Nation's Most Elusive Serial Killer, a 1986 non-fiction book by Robert Graysmith.
- One Was Not Enough: True Stories of Multiple Murderers, "The Zodiac Killer", (1986) by Georgina Lloyd.
- Duet For The Devil, a 2000 horror novel by T. Winter-Damon & Randy Chandler.
- Zodiac Unmasked, a 2002 true crime book by Robert Graysmith.
- San Francisco's Finest: Gunning for the Zodiac, a 2012 crime suspense thriller by Joseph Covino Jr.
- The Zodiac Paradox, a 2013 tie-in novel with the television series Fringe, features the Zodiac Killer being brought from the show's parallel universe due to one of Walter's experiments.
- The Most Dangerous Animal of All: Searching for My Father... And Finding the Zodiac Killer a 2014 novel by Gary L. Stewart.
- The Stringer, a 2016 thriller by Terry Cubbins.
- Unsub, a 2017 crime thriller by Meg Gardiner.
- Trail of the Zodiac, a 2017 crime thriller by Jon Mills.
- In the 2016 R. S. Belcher novel The Brotherhood of the Wheel Zodiac is the code name for a loose confederation of serial killers who maintain lodges and hunting grounds scattered across the USA.
- Tempus Investigations - Season Three, a 2020 supernatural thriller by Claus Holm has a story about the Zodiac, where the main character confronts and kills him.

== Miscellaneous ==
- During the 2016 United States presidential campaign, various opponents of Texas Senator Ted Cruz's candidacy initiated a farcical rumor on Twitter that Cruz was the Zodiac Killer. The topic has picked up interest as an internet meme, even as claimants have stated that they do not seriously believe it. In a February 2016 survey of Florida voters done by Public Policy Polling, 10% of respondents stated that they believed Cruz was the killer, while 28% felt that the possibility could not be ruled out. Cruz was born in 1970, the year after the last confirmed Zodiac-related murder was committed. One columnist observed that the rumor campaign's persistence, despite its complete implausibility, is "a matter of style over substance". Several people involved with the meme acknowledged to National Public Radio that they were well aware that Cruz could not possibly be the killer, and added, "... it's all about a feeling they have about Cruz: they think he's creepy." Cruz himself has acknowledged the meme, tweeting a photo of one of the killer's coded messages in October 2017. In 2020, following the decryption of a previously undecipherable letter from the Zodiac Killer, Cruz once again acknowledged the meme.
