= Ted Cruz–Zodiac Killer meme =

Mock conspiracy theory

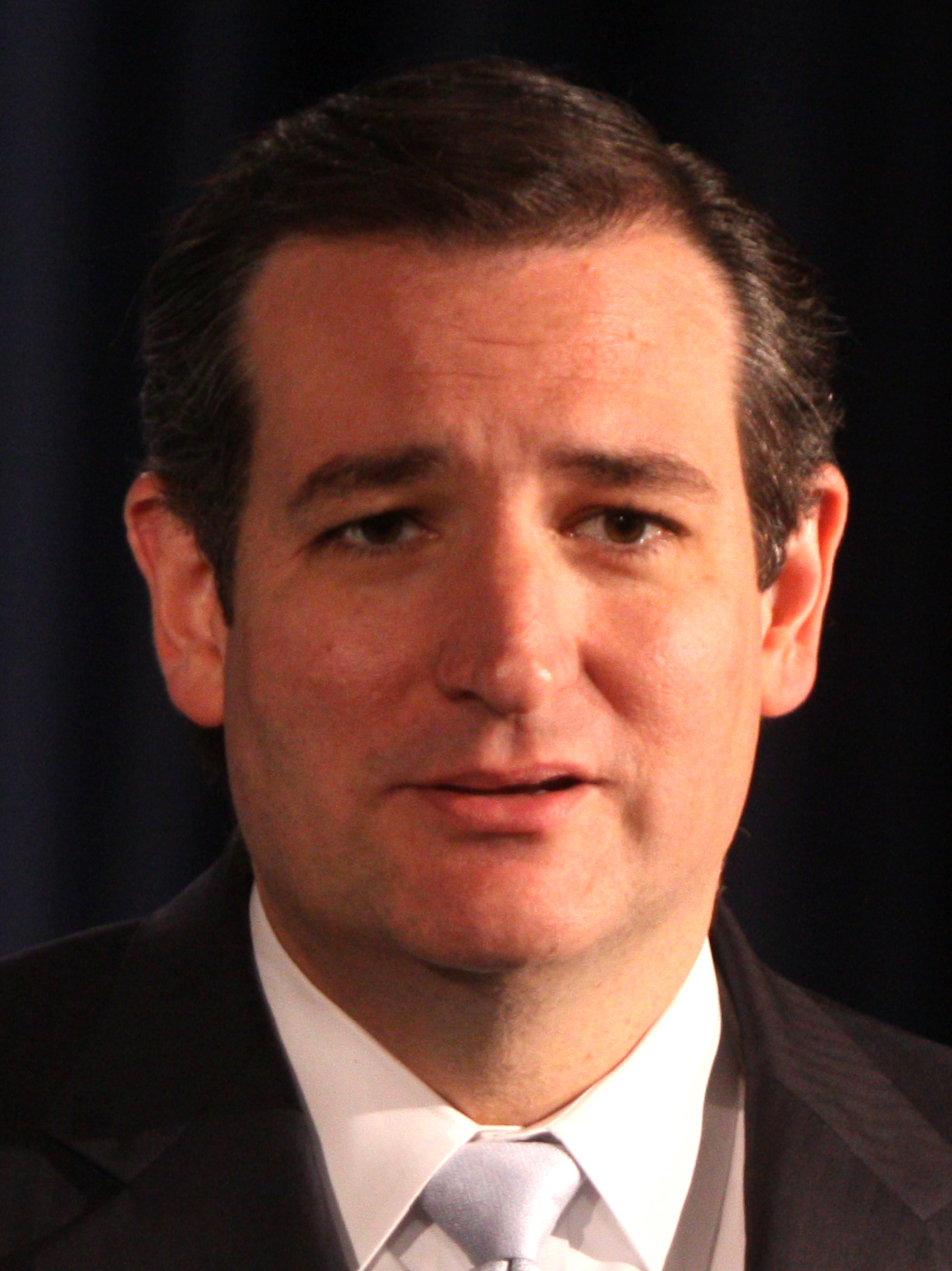
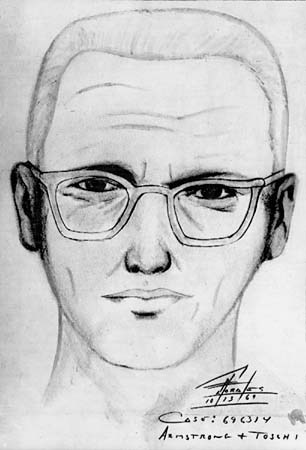
Ted Cruz, born in 1970, and a 1969 sketch of the Zodiac Killer

The Ted Cruz–Zodiac Killer meme is an Internet meme which originated in 2013 and gained popularity in 2015. The meme is a satirical conspiracy theory claiming that United States senator Ted Cruz is the real identity of the Zodiac Killer, despite Cruz being born on December 22, 1970, 14 months after the last confirmed Zodiac killing. Proponents of this meme generally do not believe that Cruz is the Zodiac Killer. According to NPR, the meme captures an unease with Cruz, "[people] think he's creepy. And they want to point that out, as clearly as they can."

== Origin and spread ==
To be clear: the Zodiac Killer line is a joke. But it's a prolific joke, and one you can find printed on bumper stickers and a variety of black metal tees across the country. For Cruz, the Baptist senator for Texas and right-wing Republican presidential candidate, it's an unexpected foray into popular culture.

— Dylan Baddour of the Houston Chronicle, April 26, 2016

A 2016 investigation by Miles Klee of The Daily Dot found the first use of the meme to be by a Twitter user in March 2013, as Cruz was speaking at the Conservative Political Action Conference and vowing to repeal the Affordable Care Act. The actual Tweet was, "Alert: Ted Cruz is speaking!! His speech is titled: 'This Is The Zodiac Speaking'". The meme was not repeated until November 2014, by another Twitter user writing about Cruz's proposal against net neutrality.

It continued in obscurity up to February 2016, when another Twitter user edited a picture of a Republican debate in order to include "Is Ted Cruz the Zodiac Killer?" in the interactive ticker at the bottom. That month, "is ted cruz the zodiac killer" was the second highest suggestion in Google's autocomplete for "is ted", but by April it was not in the autocomplete at all. News.com.au writer Matthew Dunn suggested that Google was censoring the search term, showing evidence that it accounted for 89% of total searches when compared to other terms in the autocomplete.

In April 2016, the Houston Chronicle said the meme "has a following. A Facebook group named for the meme has more than 27,000 members. A Google search turns up 621,000 hits, including exploratory articles by some of the biggest news publications on the web".

Cruz himself has jocularly alluded to the meme by tweeting one of the Zodiac Killer's cryptograms; first in October 2017 responding to a retweet from Senator Ben Sasse referring to Cruz as "the son of the guy who killed Kennedy" (a reference to a conspiracy theory involving Rafael Cruz) and then wishing a "Happy Halloween" in 2018. In December 2020, after the 340-character Zodiac cipher was cracked, Cruz retweeted an article about the cipher with the caption "uh oh". In October 2026 Cruz quote tweeted a post by DiscussingFilm about the announcement of Marvel television series Zodiac with the caption "Can't wait to watch it.".

== In popular culture ==
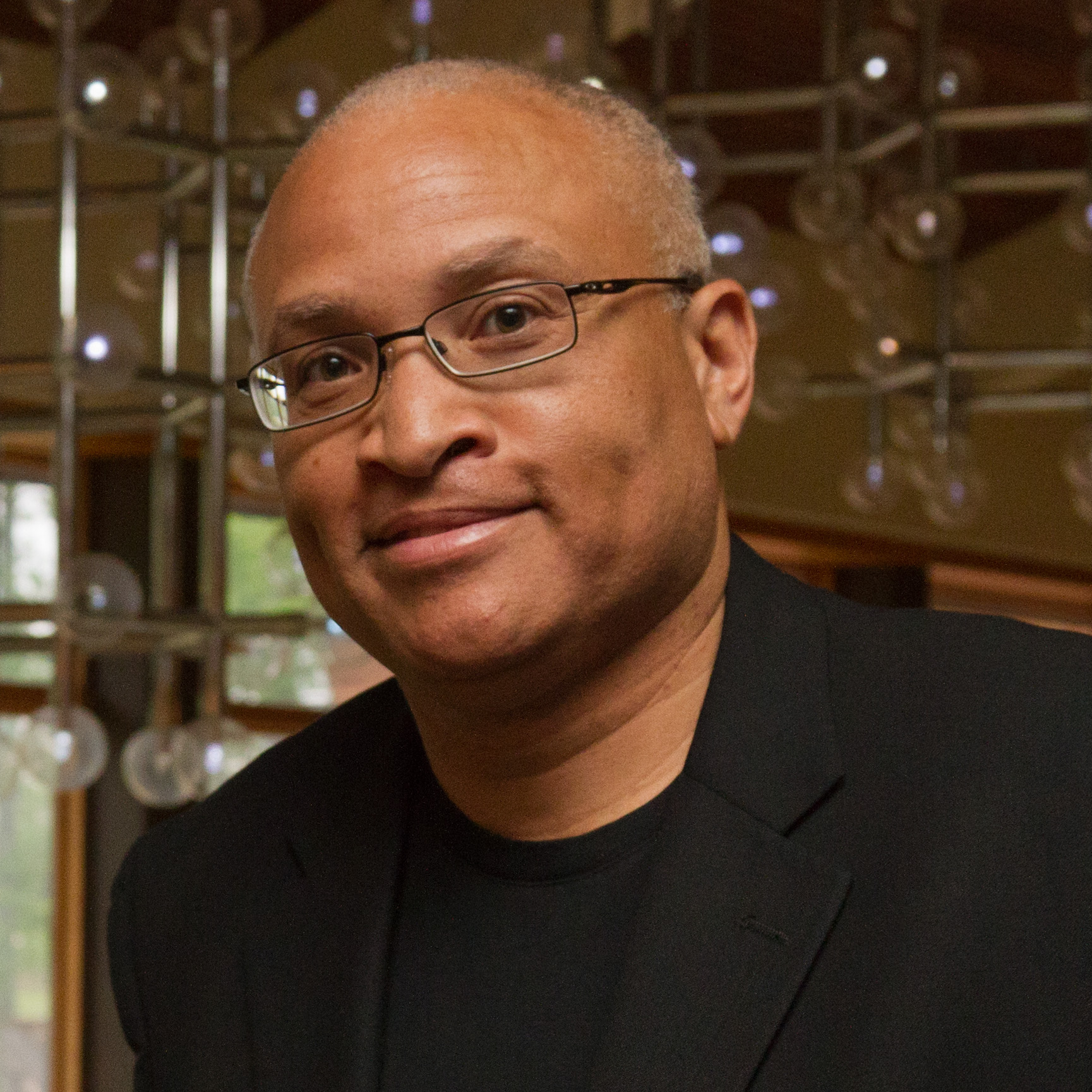
Comedian Larry Wilmore made joking suggestions that Cruz was the Zodiac Killer at the White House Correspondents' Dinner in April 2016.

After the edited image showing the question on Google trended, the meme spread into popular culture. GQ and the Chicago Tribune have referenced the meme. Books about Cruz being the Zodiac Killer, including romantic ones, were listed on Amazon.com.

In February 2016, Public Policy Polling asked registered voters in Florida ahead of the Republican primary if they believed Cruz to be the Zodiac Killer; 10% believed and 28% were not sure. The other 62% did not think he was.

Comedian Larry Wilmore made references to the meme in his April 2016 routine at the White House Correspondents' Dinner, including a joke that Cruz was not campaigning to win the nomination, but to continue a murder spree.

In October 2022, the satirical news outlet The Babylon Bee produced a sketch as part of a series following the lives of two Californians who had moved to Texas. In the sketch titled "Episode 3 – The Church", two Californians are canvassing for Beto O'Rourke as part of the 2022 US midterm elections and Cruz answers the door. In response to the canvassers, Cruz states he is short on time having "letters to write" before closing the door and inadvertently dropping one of the letters. The canvassers quickly flee after seeing that the letter is printed with a cypher. Ted Cruz plays himself in the video.

== Reception ==
Lindsey Martin, a Twitter user who helped circulate the meme, told NPR that she did so because it is "so obviously untrue ... if there was any way that it could possibly be true I would be scared to joke about it just because of the repercussions." The Verge writer Kaitlyn Tiffany opined that some may consider the subject of the meme to be "distasteful and irresponsible, even dangerous". Leigh Alexander considered its spread an example of the growing political engagement of youth, writing that in such memes, "the political figure is exaggerated, his context made grotesque or fantastical, just as in traditional political cartooning." According to Julie Lozano, an employee at Houston bar Grand Prize who named a cocktail she created "Ted Cruz is the Zodiac Killer", the point of the meme is to "[demonize] his character". Heidi Cruz responded to the meme by stating that she has "been married to him for 15 years, and I know pretty well who he is, so it doesn't bother me at all. There's a lot of garbage out there".

== See also ==
- List of conspiracy theories
- Zodiac Killer in popular culture
