= Prognosis Negative =

Prognosis Negative may be:

- Dark Victory (1939 ) film score title, Prognosis Negative
- "Prognosis Negative", 3 March 1974 episode of CBS Radio Mystery Theater, written by Sidney Slon
- "Prognosis Negative". an article by E. E. Rehmus published in The Ecphorizer, Issue 28, December 1983.
- Prognosis Negative, a fictional movie, within the "The Dog" episode of Seinfeld
- Larry David's script, entitled, "Prognosis Negative", related to Curb Your Enthusiasm
