= Gareth Penn =

American author and amateur detective

- Born: Gareth Sewell Penn; January 1, 1941 (age 85); Carmel, California, U.S.
- Education: Bachelor of Arts; Master of Arts; Master of Library Science
- Alma mater: University of California, Berkeley
- Occupations: German linguist Freelance writer True-crime Author; Amateur Detective

Gareth Sewell Penn (born January 1, 1941) is an American true crime author and amateur detective known for being among the first non-journalists to write about the Zodiac Killer case. He published a theory about the killer's motives, publicly accused a noted UC Berkeley public policy professor of the crimes, and labeled himself a one-time suspect.

Reviewing the 2007 David Fincher film Zodiac for the Las Vegas Weekly, Mike D'Angelo wrote, "I think the movie erred in selecting author Robert Graysmith as its source and nominal protagonist. Zodiac buffs know well that the true obsessive is a fellow named Gareth Penn."

== Early life ==
Penn graduated from the University of California, Berkeley in 1962 with a Bachelor of Arts degree (BA) in Germanic languages and again in 1965 with a Master of Arts (MA) in Medieval Germanic languages. He received a Master of Library Science (MLS) from U.C. Berkeley in 1971.

In 1965, Penn entered the United States Army in Berlin, Germany and received basic training at Fort Dix, New Jersey. He received artillery survey training at Fort Sill, Oklahoma, where he became an Artillery Surveyor Instructor. He received the National Defense Service Medal and the designation of Expert Rifle Marksman. In 1967, Penn moved back to Berkeley, California, where he was transferred to the Army reserves. He was honorably discharged in 1971.

== Career ==
=== Writing ===
Penn's writing, mostly focused on the Zodiac case, was largely published in The Ecphorizer, the newsletter of the San Francisco chapter of Mensa International, which had a peak readership of 700 and was published between 1981 and 1995 A 1972 piece he wrote while attending UC Berkeley, Gottfried von Strassburg and the Invisible Art was published in the peer-reviewed journal of Germanic studies Colloquia Germanica. The piece is a reflection on the legend of Tristan, a 12th-century hero of Celtic folklore.

Penn says his father, Hugh Scott Penn, who had been a U.S. Army cryptographer during World War II, introduced him to the Zodiac case while he was working for the California Department of Justice.

Penn wrote two self-published books: Times 17: The Amazing Story of the Zodiac Murders in California and Massachusetts, 1966-1981 released in 1987; and The Second Power: A Mathematical Analysis of the letters attributed to the Zodiac murderer and supplement to Times 17 in 1999.

=== Zodiac Killer ===
Gareth Penn started writing about the Zodiac case in a 1981 article for California Magazine entitled Portrait of the Artist as a Mass Murderer.

In Portrait, Penn theorized that the Zodiac crime scenes were selected by the killer in order to create a geometric shape over the surface of the San Francisco Bay Area as a sort of "murderous art project." Part of Penn's commentary about that theory included the observation that, "Other artists had sought to remove their work from the ordinary human perspective. Zodiac trumped them all."

Penn then spent the better part of two decades publicly accusing University of California, Berkeley public policy professor Michael O'Hare of the Zodiac murders.

==== Accusation against Michael O'Hare ====
Starting around 1981, Penn began publicly accusing University of California, Berkeley public policy professor Michael O'Hare of the Zodiac murders in amateur newsletters and self-published books. Penn openly accused O'Hare on at least two occasions. The basis for these accusations was Penn's cryptographic analysis of a Zodiac letter, which he claimed yielded the name "Mike O." He also accused O'Hare of the murder of Joan Webster, a graduate architecture student at Harvard who disappeared in 1981 and whose remains were found near Boston in 1990. Penn argued that a "geometric design" yielded similarities between the Webster murder and the Zodiac killings in California. On that basis, he accused O'Hare of murdering Webster. O'Hare denied being involved in any murder, and has written about his strange experience.

O'Hare filed an FBI complaint against Penn and in May 1981, the Bureau investigated Penn for possible extortion. According to FBI memos, an agent "contacted Penn by telephone and told him that if he was responsible for the correspondence to [O'Hare] he should immediately cease and desist, pointing out that it could jeopardize any investigation and he could possibly be subject to both civil and criminal penalties."

In a May 1981 meeting with FBI agents, Penn "freely admitted sending material to [O'Hare] but stated he had no intent to extort anything.

== Cryptography blog ==
Penn continues writing about the case, maintaining a narrative blog entitled D550.

== Books ==
- Penn, Gareth, Times 17: The Amazing Story of the Zodiac Murders in California and Massachusetts, 1966-1981 (CA: The Foxglove Press, April 1987) ISBN 0-9618494-0-1.
- Penn, Gareth, The Second Power: A mathematical analysis of the letters attributed to the Zodiac murderer, (CA: The Foxglove Press, December 1999).
