= This Is the Zodiac Speaking =

2020 video game

This is the Zodiac Speaking
- Developer: Punch Punk Games
- Publisher: Klabater
- Director: Krzysztof Grudzinski
- Writers: Krzysztof Grudzinski; Łukasz Orbitowski
- Platforms: PC; XBox One; PlayStation 4; Nintendo Switch
- Release: 15 October 2020
- Genres: Stealth; Mystery; Puzzle
- Mode: Single-player

This Is the Zodiac Speaking is a 2020 stealth mystery puzzle game developed by Punch Punk Games and published by Klabater. The game is centered around the Zodiac Killer, a serial killer who was active in California in the late 1960s and early '70s. The story follows journalist Robert Hartnell as he undergoes dream therapy after surviving an encounter with the titular killer. During these dream sessions Robert visits various locations relating to the Zodiac's crimes and must piece together a timeline of events.

== Gameplay ==
This Is the Zodiac Speaking is a first-person game that puts players in control of the protagonist Robert Hartnell. Gameplay primarily revolves around the player finding clues by exploring the setting and interacting with various objects. The game is mainly set in two locations: Robert's house, where clues are collected, and Dr. Landau's office where Robert undergoes dream therapy that transports him subconsciously to a location that relates to one of the Zodiac's victims.

Throughout the investigative phase, the player is stalked by the Zodiac Killer, who roams freely around the location. To counter this the player must use stealth and avoid being in Zodiac's direct line of sight. If the player is caught they are taken back to their starting location. However, an option to remove Zodiac from the investigation sequences exists in the game's settings, allowing the player to explore the scene without hindrance. Once the investigation is completed, the player must find a cipher somewhere in the scene to return to Landau's office.

== Synopsis ==
Robert Hartnell is an investigative journalist who has become enamored with the Zodiac case. After receiving a letter from the killer himself, Robert travels to Mount Diablo where he comes face-to-face with Zodiac, leading to an altercation that leaves Robert mentally scarred. Following the attempt on his life, Robert starts visiting Psychiatrist Dr. Landau where he undergoes experimental dream therapy to help him recover from his trauma. During his dreams he has to piece together the events around the killings of Cheri Jo Bates and Cecelia Shepard as well as uncover a repressed memory from his childhood.

== Development and release ==
This Is the Zodiac Speaking was developed by Polish video game developers Punch Punk Games and published by Klabater. The game was conceived by Krzysztof Grudzinski, the director of Punch Punk Games, who had a long fascination with the Zodiac case. For the game's visuals a low poly aesthetic was chosen. According to Grudzinski, this was done so the game could "be modern and in noir style and mood" whilst at the same time make it "more distinct from the usual styles in which thriller stories are told".

The story was written by Grudzinski alongside author Łukasz Orbitowski. Grudzinski also cited David Fincher's Zodiac and the television series Mindhunter as influences.

Although initially reported to have a 24 September release date, the game was released on 15 October 2020 on PC, Xbox One, PlayStation 4 and Nintendo Switch.

== Reception ==
This Is the Zodiac Speaking received "mixed or average" reviews according review to aggregator Metacritic, whilst only 8% of critics recommended the game on OpenCritic.

Push Square's Graham Banas described the game's narrative as "indecipherable" and criticized the game's mechanics, calling it repetitive. Banas, however, praised the environments of the game's dream sequences though noted that these were prone to frequent glitches. In closing he stated: "Ultimately the game feels like the first draft of a really great idea. Add some polish, and we'd love to see what it could become".

Cameron Corliss from Game Rant panned the game for its clunky dialogue, visuals, performance issues and gameplay, stating: "This is the Zodiac Speaking desperately wants to be a game like The Vanishing of Ethan Carter, but it doesn't invest in its dialogue, gameplay, or environments enough to achieve that goal". Corliss also noted that the Zodiac's AI was inconsistent, stating "...it's impossible to tell if the Zodiac will be thwarted by sidestepping him and crouching [...] or if he'll activate x-ray vision and spot the player while crouched on the opposite side of a car". Ollie Reynolds from Nintendo Life also did not like the game's art style and visuals. He also pointed out glitches where parts of the environment would "pop in and out constantly", comparing it to "looking into a kaleidoscope". Reynolds also criticized the stealth gameplay believing that Zodiac was too easy to avoid.

James McMahon of NME criticized the game for using the Zodiac Killer arguing that it was disrespectful to his surviving victims, and that it only served to "embolden [his] celebrity status".
