= Zodiac Killer =

Serial killer in California in the 1960s

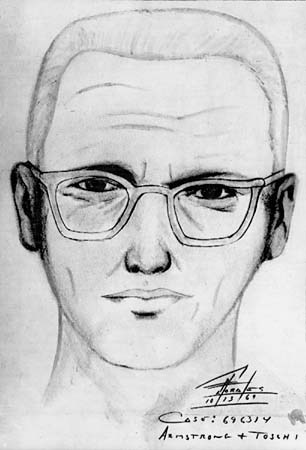
- Composite sketch made in 1969 based on eyewitness accounts of the Presidio Heights murder
- Status: Unidentified
- Motive: Unclear
- Wanted by: Federal Bureau of Investigation
- Wanted since: 1968

Details
- Span of crimes: 1968–1969
- Country: United States
- State: California
- Locations: San Francisco Bay Area; Napa Valley
- Killed: 5 (confirmed); 37 (claimed)
- Injured: 2 (confirmed)
- Weapons: 9 mm pistol (2 different weapons); .22 caliber pistol; 10–12-inch knife

The Zodiac Killer (also known by the pseudonym The Zodiac) is an unidentified serial killer who murdered at least five people in the San Francisco Bay Area between December 1968 and October 1969. The Zodiac attacked three couples and a cab driver in Benicia, Vallejo, unincorporated Napa County, and the city of San Francisco. Two of the Zodiac's seven victims survived.

In a series of letters mailed to Bay Area newspapers, the Zodiac took credit for the murders, described details known only to police, threatened bombings and more murders if the newspapers did not print his letters, and included cryptograms with his correspondence. Two of the Zodiac's four cryptograms were decrypted in 1969 and 2020, and the other two remain unsolved. The Zodiac's last letter was received by the San Francisco Chronicle in 1974. In the letter, the Zodiac claimed to have killed 37 people.

Despite several theories about the Zodiac's true identity, the only suspect police named was Arthur Leigh Allen, a former elementary school teacher and convicted sex offender who died in 1992. The Zodiac's murders, cryptograms, and letters to newspapers have made the case one of the most famous unsolved cases in American history. The Zodiac has become a fixture of popular culture, and the search for his identity continues to be pursued by amateur detectives all over the world.

In 2004, the San Francisco Police Department marked the case "inactive", but subsequently re-opened the case in 2006. The California Department of Justice, the Federal Bureau of Investigation, the city of Vallejo, and the Napa and Solano county sheriffs maintain the case status as "open".

== Murders and correspondence ==
Map of the Zodiac Killer attacks
1 Murders of David Faraday and Betty Lou Jensen
2 Attack on Michael Mageau and Darlene Ferrin
3 Attack on Bryan Hartnell and Cecelia Shepard
4 Murder of Paul Lee Stine

Police and investigators concur The Zodiac attacked seven people on four occasions in California. Five victims died; two survived:

1. David Arthur Faraday (17) and Betty Lou Jensen (16) were shot and killed on December 20, 1968, on Lake Herman Road in Benicia.
2. Michael Renault Mageau (19) and Darlene Elizabeth Ferrin (22) were shot around midnight between July 4 and 5, 1969, in the parking lot of Blue Rock Springs Park in Vallejo. Mageau survived the attack; Ferrin died at Kaiser Foundation Hospital.
3. Bryan Calvin Hartnell (20) and Cecelia Ann Shepard (22) were stabbed on September 27, 1969, at Lake Berryessa in Napa County. Hartnell survived; Shepard died from her injuries on September 29 at Queen of the Valley Hospital.
4. Paul Lee Stine (29) was shot and killed on October 11, 1969, in the Presidio Heights neighborhood of San Francisco.

From 1969 to 1974, the Zodiac sent over twenty letters to newspapers, police, Chronicle writer Paul Avery, and attorney Melvin Belli. In the first sentence of the third letter, the writer identified himself as "This is The Zodiac speaking," and signed all his letters with a symbol resembling the crosshairs of a gunsight:. Four of the mailings included cryptograms; only two have been solved. The letters were postmarked in San Francisco and Pleasanton.

The Zodiac's confirmed correspondence with date, recipient, and incipit:

1. July 31st 1969: San Francisco Chronicle, San Francisco Examiner, and Vallejo Times. One-third of "Z408 cryptogram" enclosed with each letter. "I am the killer of the 2 teenagers last Christmass..."
2. August 4th 1969: Examiner. "This is the Zodiac speaking."
3. October 13th 1969: Chronicle. Swatch of Paul Stine's shirt. "I am the murderer of the taxi driver..."
4. November 8th 1969: Chronicle. "Z340 cryptogram." The "Dripping Pen" card. "I though you would need a good laugh..."
5. November 9th 1969: Chronicle. Bomb diagram. "...I have killed 7 people".
6. December 20th 1969: Melvin Belli. Swatch of Stine's shirt. "...happy Christmass."
7. April 20th 1970: Chronicle. "Z13 cryptogram." "My name is..."
8. April 28th 1970: Chronicle. Greeting card. "I hope you enjoy yourselves..."
9. June 26th 1970: Chronicle. "Z32 cryptogram." "I have become very upset..."
10. July 24th 1970: Chronicle. "I am rather unhappy..."
11. July 26th 1970: Chronicle. "Being that you will not wear some nice ⌖ buttons..."
12. October 5th 1970: Chronicle. Thirteen-hole punch card. "You'll hate me..."
13. October 27th 1970: Paul Avery at Chronicle. Halloween card. "From your secret pal..."
14. March 13th 1971: Los Angeles Times. "...I am crack proof."
15. January 29th 1974: Chronicle. The "Exorcist" letter.

=== Lake Herman Road murders ===
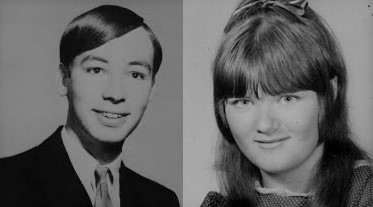
David Arthur Faraday and Betty Lou Jensen

The first murders retroactively attributed to the Zodiac were the shootings of high school students Betty Lou Jensen (16) and David Arthur Faraday (17) on December 20, 1968. Faraday was a student at Vallejo High School, while Jensen was a student at Hogan High School. At 8:30 p.m. Faraday picked up Jensen, and the couple visited one of Jensen's friends. Sometime after 9 p.m., they drove to the outskirts of Vallejo and parked at a lover's lane on Lake Herman Road, just inside the Benicia city limits. Between 10:15 and 10:30 p.m., a passing motorist noticed the couple parked on a gravel runoff near the gate to a water pumping station. The couple was spotted again at 11 p.m.

Between 11:05 and 11:10 p.m., Faraday and Jensen were attacked. Police determined that their assailant parked his vehicle about ten feet alongside the passenger side of Faraday's car. He fired several shots at Faraday's car as he walked around to the driver's side. None of the shots hit Faraday and Jensen. The couple scrambled to get out through the passenger door; Jensen succeeded. As Faraday was exiting, the killer shot him in the head with a .22-caliber pistol. The assailant chased Jensen as she fled, firing six shots at her back. Only one missed. Police theorized the whole attack took two to three minutes.

At 11:10 p.m., a motorist spotted the couple's bodies and alerted police. Jensen was dead. Faraday was still breathing. He died at the hospital. There were no witnesses and no usable tire or foot prints. The only motive the police could deduce was a "madman" wanting to kill. Despite an intense investigation in the following months, no viable suspects emerged. The murders were extensively covered by the media.

=== Blue Rock Springs murder ===
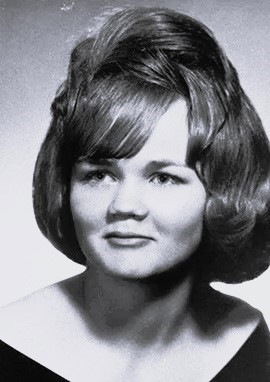
Darlene Ferrin

Darlene Ferrin (22) and Michael Mageau (19) were shot shortly after midnight on July 4, 1969. Ferrin was popular in Vallejo due to her job at a local restaurant, where she met Mageau. On July 4, they went on a date despite the fact that Ferrin was married. After 11:30 p.m., Ferrin received a phone call at her house. She arrived at Mageau's house around 11:50 p.m.

Immediately after leaving Mageau's house, the couple noticed they were being followed by a man in a light-colored car. Ferrin drove out of Vallejo in the direction of Lake Herman Road. Shortly before midnight, she turned her car into an empty parking lot at Blue Rock Springs Park. This was another lover's lane, located just two miles from Lake Herman Road. Ferrin either parked or stalled 70 feet from the lot entrance. Another vehicle parked about 80 feet to their left. The driver turned his headlights off and sat motionless. Mageau asked who the driver was. Ferrin told him not to worry. The stranger abruptly tore away from the parked couple.

Five minutes later, the stranger returned, parked a few feet next to Mageau's side of the car and got out. He shone a flashlight into Ferrin's car as he approached. Assuming he was a police officer, the couple rolled down Mageau's window. Without speaking, the stranger fired a 9mm pistol into the car. One bullet hit Mageau in the right arm, and the other hit Ferrin in the neck. Mageau tried to leave the car, but his door handle was missing or removed. The assailant returned to his car, opened the door, and did something Mageau could not see. As Mageau struggled to exit the vehicle, the stranger shot him and Ferrin two more times each. The killer hurried into his car and drove off. A golf course caretaker heard the shots around 12:10 a.m. The perpetrator left no clues that could be traced back to him.

Three teenagers drove into the parking lot, saw the wounded couple, and got help. Police arrived at 12:20 a.m. Twenty minutes later, Ferrin was pronounced dead at the hospital. Mageau survived and described the attacker as a heavyset White man, around 5'8" tall. He estimated the assailant's weight as 195–200 pounds, with a large face and curly light brown hair. The killer wore dark clothes and no glasses. These details were not enough to develop a suspect. Moments after 12:40 a.m., the Vallejo Police Department (VPD) received a phone call from a payphone two blocks from headquarters. The man on the other end of the line said:

"I want to report a double murder. If you go one mile east on Columbus Parkway to the public park you will find kids in a brown car. They were shot with a 9-millimeter Luger. I also killed those kids last year. Goodbye."

Serial killers will commonly pause to reflect on their actions. Authors Michael Kelleher and David Van Nuys speculated that the seven months between the attacks on Lake Herman Road and at Blue Rock Springs was a "cooling off period" for the Zodiac.

==== Ferrin–Zodiac prior relationship theory ====
A 1966 photo of Ferrin and a man who resembles the Zodiac composite sketch from the Stine murder.

Many have speculated that Darlene Ferrin knew her killer. Kelleher and Nuys credit the origin of the theory to Robert Graysmith's 1986 book Zodiac. He argued extensively for a connection based on interviews with Ferrin's friends. A definitive connection has not been proven.

Mageau gave conflicting accounts on whether Ferrin knew her killer. At the hospital, he stated he did not know the murderer. At another point, he said the assailant's name was "Richard". Ferrin's sister claimed one of Darlene's boyfriends was named Richard. In the Zodiac's later correspondence, he only ever refers to Ferrin as "girl".

In Graysmith's telling, Ferrin and Mageau were chased. They only stopped when their car hit a log and stalled. The detective on the scene noticed that the car was still on and in low gear. Kelleher and Nuys suggest that Ferrin would not tell Mageau to ignore the mystery driver, nor would they assume he was a police officer, if they had not stopped at the spot by choice.

Ferrin did know Betty Lou Jensen and David Faraday. She lived less than two blocks from Jensen and attended Hogan High School. She was also familiar with Lake Herman Road's status as a lover's lane. There is a picture of Ferrin and an unknown man who closely resembles a composite sketch of the Zodiac. In a 2011 episode of America's Most Wanted, police stated they believe the photo was taken in San Francisco in either 1966 or 1967.

=== First letters from the Zodiac ===
Zodiac letter to the San Francisco Chronicle, August 1, 1969.

On August 1, 1969, the Vallejo Times, San Francisco Chronicle and San Francisco Examiner all received letters written by someone taking credit for the attacks in Vallejo. The three letters were nearly identical and began, "I am the killer of the 2 teenagers last Christmass at Lake Herman & the girl last 4th of July." The three letters were rife with misspellings and presented the first definitive link between the two separate attacks in Vallejo.

Enclosed in all three letters was a different cryptogram. They combined to form a 408-symbol cipher (Z408). The writer claimed, "In this cipher is my idenity. [sic]" He demanded the codes be printed on each newspaper's front page. If they were not, he threatened to "cruise around all weekend killing lone people in the night then move on to kill again, until I end up with a dozen people over the weekend." The Chronicle published its third of the cryptogram inside the August 2 edition. In the accompanying article, Vallejo Police Chief Jack E. Stiltz said, "We're not satisfied that the letter was written by the murderer". He requested the killer send more facts to prove his identity.

On August 4, the Examiner received a letter with the salutation, "Dear Editor This is the Zodiac speaking." This letter marked the debut of the Zodiac persona. It was the first time the killer called himself by this nickname.

In this second letter to the media, the killer wrote at much greater length. He happily obliged Chief Stiltz's request for more information about both murders. He provided minute details about how he shot Michael Mageau. He described the golf course caretaker. Regarding the Lake Herman Road attack, he revealed that he had taped a flashlight to his gun in order to aim easily in the dark. The August 4 letter also referred investigators back to the Z408 cipher. The killer wrote, "when they do crack it they will have me".

Part 1 of Z408 cipher and its decryption by Donald and Bettye Harden. (Parts 2 & 3)

The decoded message did not reveal the Zodiac's identity. Both the Federal Bureau of Investigation (FBI) and Central Intelligence Agency (CIA) attempted to decrypt the Z408 cipher. On August 5, it was cracked by Donald and Bettye Harden, a couple in Salinas. Neither was a cryptologist. Bettye deployed a crib by correctly guessing the word "kill" would appear in the message.

The message was rife with misspellings and referred to Richard Connell's 1924 short story "The Most Dangerous Game". The Zodiac explained killing was a way of collecting slaves for his afterlife. The full text of the decoded Z408 cipher reads:

I like killing people because it is so much fun it is more fun than killing wild game in the forrest because man is the most dangeroue anamal of all to kill something gives me the most thrilling experence it is even better than getting your rocks off with a girl the best part of it is thae when I die I will be reborn in paradice and all the I have killed will become my slaves I will not give you my name because you will try to sloi down or atop my collectiog of slaves for my afterlife ebeorietemethhpiti

VPD asked a psychiatrist at the California Medical Facility in Vacaville to analyze the Zodiac's message. The doctor concluded the writer felt omnipotent based on his fantasy about collecting spiritual slaves. The analysis described the Zodiac as "someone you would expect to be brooding and isolated". The psychiatrist speculated the killer's praise of murder over sex could be "an expression of inadequacy".

=== Lake Berryessa murder ===
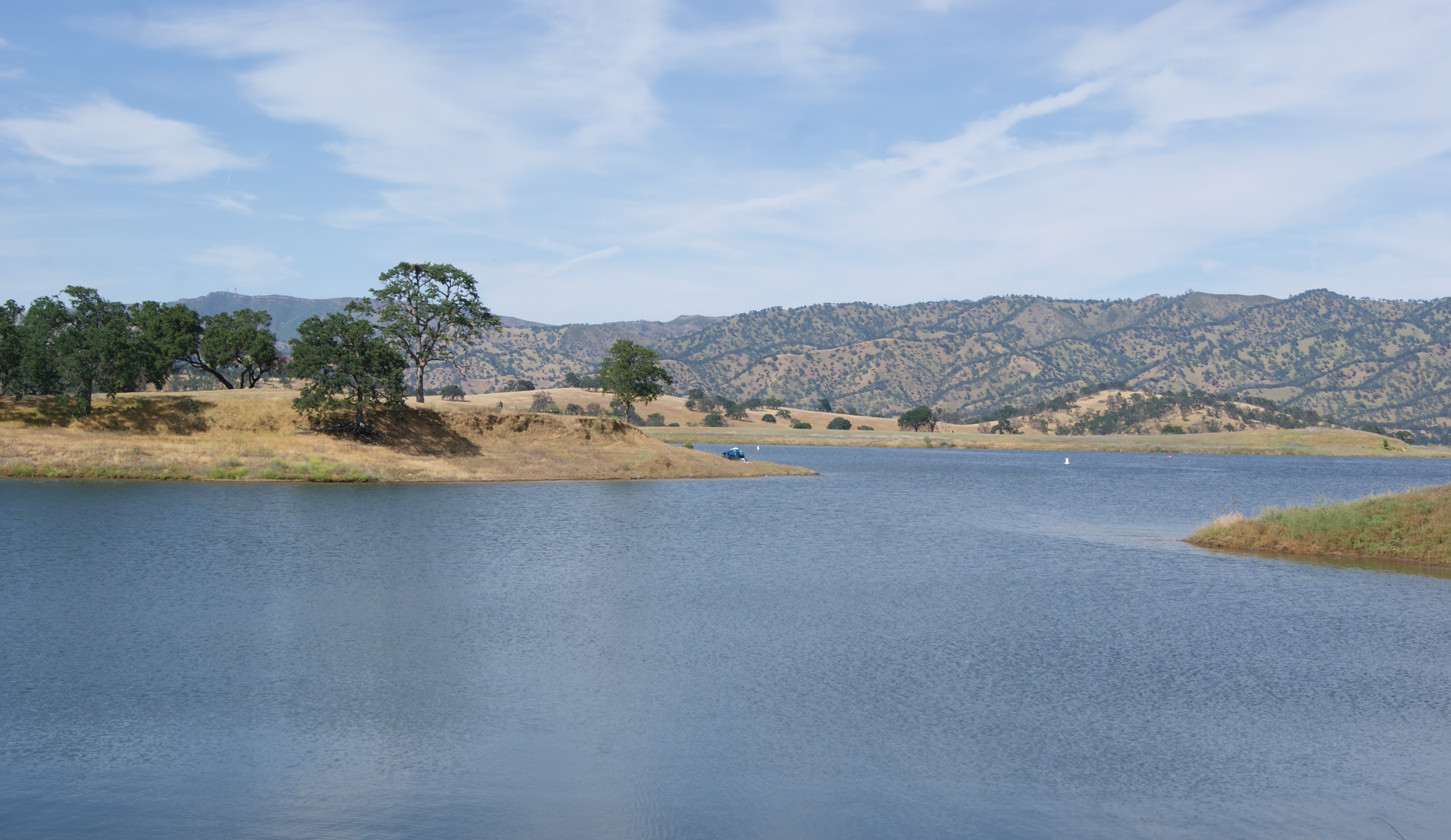
Lake Berryessa

Zodiac crosshairs symbol

At 4:00 p.m. on September 27, 1969, Pacific Union College students Bryan Hartnell (20) and Cecelia Shepard (22) were picnicking at Lake Berryessa on a small island connected by a sand spit to Twin Oak Ridge. Sometime later, Shepard noticed a man watching them. When he emerged from behind a tree, he put on a black executioner's hood with clip-on sunglasses. He wore a bib with a white 3x3" symbol on it. He brandished a gun, which Hartnell believed was a .45. The Zodiac said he escaped from jail after killing a guard and needed their car and money to travel to Mexico.

Before tying up Shepard, the Zodiac made Shepard bind Hartnell with precut lengths of plastic clothesline. He tightened Hartnell's bonds because Shepard's knots were too loose. Hartnell still believed they were being robbed when the Zodiac drew a knife and stabbed them. Hartnell suffered six wounds and Shepard ten.

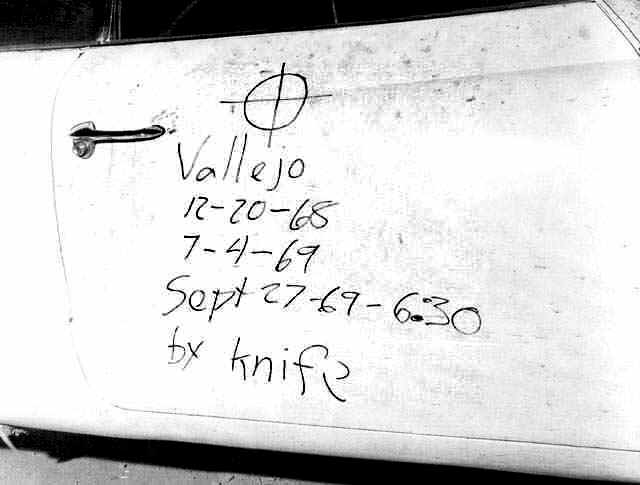
Photo of Bryan Hartnell's car door, where the Zodiac tallied his crimes

The Zodiac hiked 500 yards to Knoxville Road, leaving several footprints for investigators to study. The killer drew the symbol on Hartnell's car door with a black felt-tip pen and wrote beneath it:

Vallejo
12-20-68
7-4-69
Sept 27–69–6:30
by knife

After hearing the victims' screams, a fisherman and his son sought help. Hartnell untied Shepard's ropes with his teeth, and she freed him. Two park rangers arrived and tended to the stricken couple until the ambulance arrived. Napa County deputies Dave Collins and Ray Land responded to the report of the attack. Shepard was conscious and gave a detailed description of their attacker. She and Hartnell were taken to a hospital in Napa. Shepard lapsed into a coma during transport; she never regained consciousness and died two days later. Hartnell survived to recount his tale to the press.

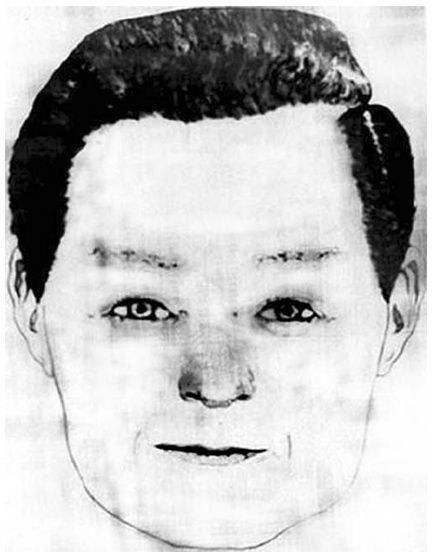
Witness sketch of man seen at Lake Berryessa shortly before the murder

Earlier that day, a suspicious man had been seen around Lake Berryessa by several people. A dentist and his son saw a heavyset man looking at them from a distance before he hurried off. Around 2:50 p.m., three women noticed a strange man as they stopped on their way to Lake Berryessa. After they had arrived to sunbathe, they noticed the man again. Since they had potentially seen the Zodiac without his hood, the women worked with Napa Valley Register photographer Robert McKenzie to create a composite sketch using an Identi-Kit facial compositing device. Police showed the image to other potential witnesses.

The suspect was described as being roughly 6' tall and weighing 200 pounds, which matched the descriptions by Shepard and Hartnell. Graysmith also drew a sketch of the Zodiac's costume after Hartnell described it to him. Napa County detective Ken Narlow was assigned to the case from the outset and worked on solving the crime until his retirement in 1987.

The Zodiac drove 27 miles from the crime scene to a car wash in downtown Napa. He used a payphone to call the Napa County Sheriff's Department at 7:40 p.m. He told the dispatcher he wished to "report a murder – no, a double murder" and confessed to the crime. He did not hang up the phone. KVON radio reporter Pat Stanley found the phone off the hook a few minutes later. The payphone was located a few blocks from the sheriff's office. Detectives lifted a wet palm print from the phone but were never able to match it to any suspect.

=== Presidio Heights murder ===
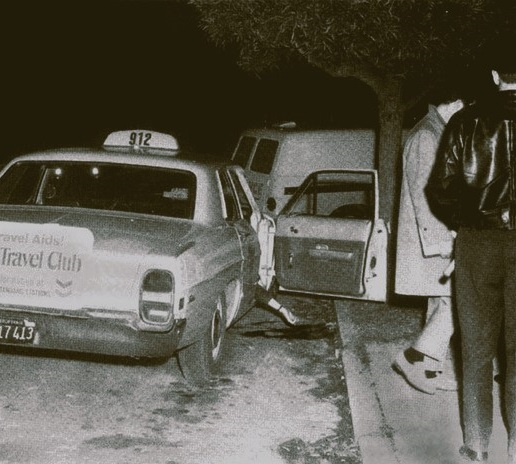
Crime scene image at Washington and Cherry Street, October 11, 1969

The last confirmed Zodiac murder took place two weeks after the Lake Berryessa attacks. Around 9:40 p.m. on October 11 in downtown San Francisco, the Zodiac hailed a cab which was driven by a doctoral student named Paul Stine. The killer gave a destination in Presidio Heights. When the taxi arrived at Washington and Maple streets, the killer asked to be driven another block. At Washington and Cherry around 9:55 p.m., the Zodiac shot Stine in the head with a handgun and took his wallet and car keys.

Three teenagers witnessed the crime from a house directly across the street from Stine's cab. The Zodiac's face was clearly visible by streetlight. The teenagers watched as the Zodiac wiped down the vehicle and rifled through Stine's clothes. He left behind two partial fingerprints from his right hand. While the Zodiac was tending to the cab, the kids called the San Francisco Police Department (SFPD). They described the criminal as a "husky" White man in a "dark or black jacket". The dispatcher mistakenly alerted SFPD that the suspect was Black.

Just two minutes after the call to SFPD, two nearby patrol officers responded to the radio dispatch. They encountered a White man in dark clothes walking north towards the Presidio army base. They pulled alongside the man and asked if he had seen anything suspicious. The man confirmed he had seen someone waving a gun and heading east. The officers hurried away. The Zodiac later claimed he was the witness that spoke to the two officers. When police arrived at the scene, Stine was declared dead. SFPD canvassed the area, including the Presidio. The Zodiac had probably fled the area in a car by then.

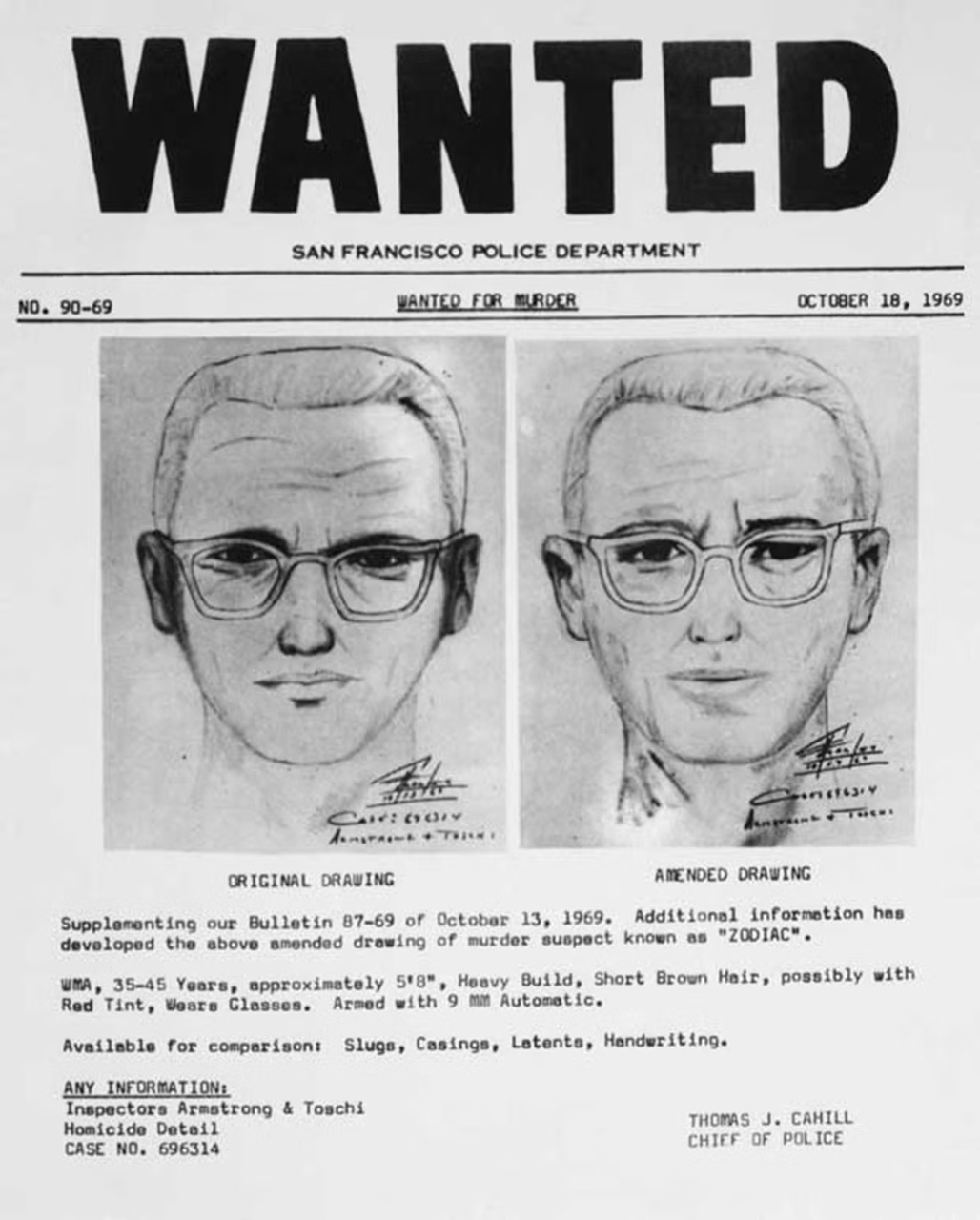
October 1969 SFPD poster featuring initial sketch made from the teenagers' description (left), and one based on the officers' description of the man they encountered (right).

Police assumed the murder was a result of the robbery. However, the Zodiac mailed a bloody piece of Paul Stine's shirt to the San Francisco Chronicle on October 13. He enclosed it in a letter where he boasted about the murder and claimed to have clandestinely watched SFPD search for him. The Zodiac also threatened to shoot a tire on a school bus and kill children as they exited.

The teenage witnesses helped a police artist make a composite sketch of the man they saw at Stine's cab. The two patrol officers who questioned the witness near the scene realized it may have been the Zodiac. They also helped develop a sketch of the suspect.

SFPD detectives Bill Armstrong and Dave Toschi were assigned to the case. Toschi ended up working on the case by himself and filled eight filing cabinets with potential suspects. In 1976, he told the Associated Press that Zodiac's letters were an "ego game". He believed the killer lived and worked in the San Francisco Bay Area. "He's a weekend killer. Why can't he get away Monday through Thursday? Does his job keep him close to home? I would speculate he maybe has a menial job, is well thought of and blends into the crowd...I think he's quite intelligent and better educated than someone who misspells words as frequently as he does in his letters."

After working on the Zodiac case for seven years, Toschi started writing anonymous letters praising his own investigative work to Chronicle columnist Armistead Maupin. Two years later in 1978, Toschi was removed from the case and demoted to pawn shop detail. He expressed regret for the hoax. That same year, Maupin also received a purported Zodiac letter. SFPD investigated whether Toschi wrote it as well and concluded he did not.

=== A.M. San Francisco interview ===
On October 22, 1969, a man claiming to be Zodiac called the Oakland Police Department and demanded to speak to either Melvin Belli or F. Lee Bailey live on KGO-TV's A.M. San Francisco. Melvin Belli agreed to appear, and during the live broadcast, a man calling himself "Sam" phoned the show's producers. "Sam" told Belli he would not reveal his identity for fear of being executed, but requested Belli meet him that morning in front of the St. Vincent de Paul thrift shop, on Mission Street in Daly City. Belli, followed by police and camera crews, waited forty-five minutes, but "Sam" never showed up. In subsequent calls to Belli, "Sam" was discovered to be Eric Weill, a patient at a psychiatric hospital.

=== November & December 1969 correspondence ===
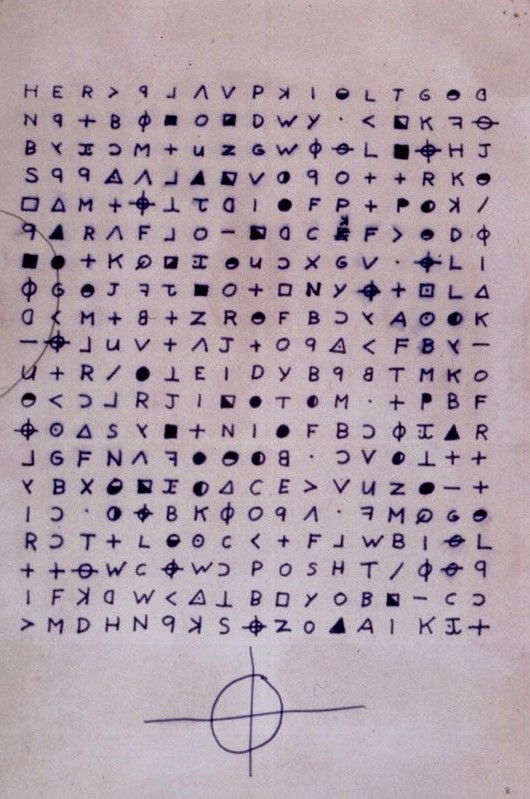
The Zodiac's Z340 cypher, November 8, 1969

On November 8, 1969, Zodiac mailed a card with a 340-character cryptogram (Z340) to the Chronicle, and demanded the cryptogram be printed on the front page. For 51 years, the Z340 cryptogram remained unsolved until it was deciphered by an international team of private citizens on December 5, 2020.

The cryptology group included American software engineer David Oranchak, Australian mathematician Sam Blake, and Belgian programmer Jarl Van Eycke. Using a program made by Van Eycke called AZdecrypt, the team ran 650,000 possible solutions for the cipher until the program came up with the best possible encryption key. The Zodiac had apparently made a mistake when creating the cipher, which made it more difficult to solve.

In the decrypted message, Zodiac denied being the "Sam," who spoke on A.M. San Francisco, and explained he was not afraid of the gas chamber "because it will send me to paradice all the sooner." The team submitted their findings to the FBI's Cryptographic and Racketeering Records Unit. The FBI verified the decryption and concluded the decoded message provided no further clues to Zodiac's identity. Subsequent analysis confirmed the Z340 decryption using unicity distance as a measure.

The decoded Z340 cipher contained Zodiac's deliberate misspellings:

I hope you are having lots of fan in trying to catch me that wasn't me on the TV show which bringo up a point about me I am not afraid of the gas chamber becaase it will send me to paradlce all the sooher because e now have enough slaves to worv for me where every one else has nothing when they reach paradice so they are afraid of death I am not afraid because i vnow that my new life is life will be an easy one in paradice death

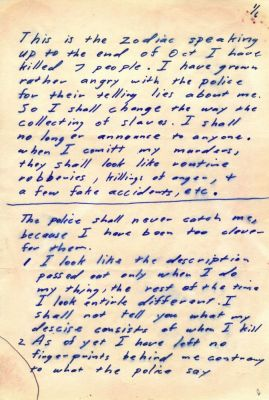
The first page of the letter sent on November 9, 1969

On November 9, the Chronicle received a seven-page letter from Zodiac. In his letter, Zodiac described being stopped and questioned by two policemen three minutes after he shot Stine, threatened to blow up a school bus, and included a diagram of a bomb. The Zodiac boasted police would never catch him because, "I have been too clever for them". On November 12, the Chronicle printed an edited version of the letter.

One year after the Lake Herman Road murders on December 20, the Zodiac mailed a letter to Melvin Belli and enclosed another swatch of Paul Stine's shirt. In the letter, Zodiac pleaded, "Please help me I am drownding...I can not remain in control for much longer."

=== April 1970 letter and card ===
For the remainder of 1970, the Zodiac continued to communicate with authorities and the press by mail. In a letter to the San Francisco Chronicle postmarked April 20, he wrote, "My name is—". It was followed by a 13-character cipher (Z13) which has not been definitively solved.

The Z13 cipher:

The cryptologist Craig P. Bauer proposed the solution "Alfred E. Neuman", the mascot of humor magazine Mad. Ryan Garlick, a University of North Texas computer science and engineering professor, used the key to the Z340 to get the solution "Dr. Eat a Torpedo", torpedo possibly referring to a railway torpedo or to bang snap fireworks. Garlick believes that this is an insult directed at D. C. B. Marsh, then president of the American Cryptogram Association, who had publicly challenged Zodiac to reveal his full name in a cipher.

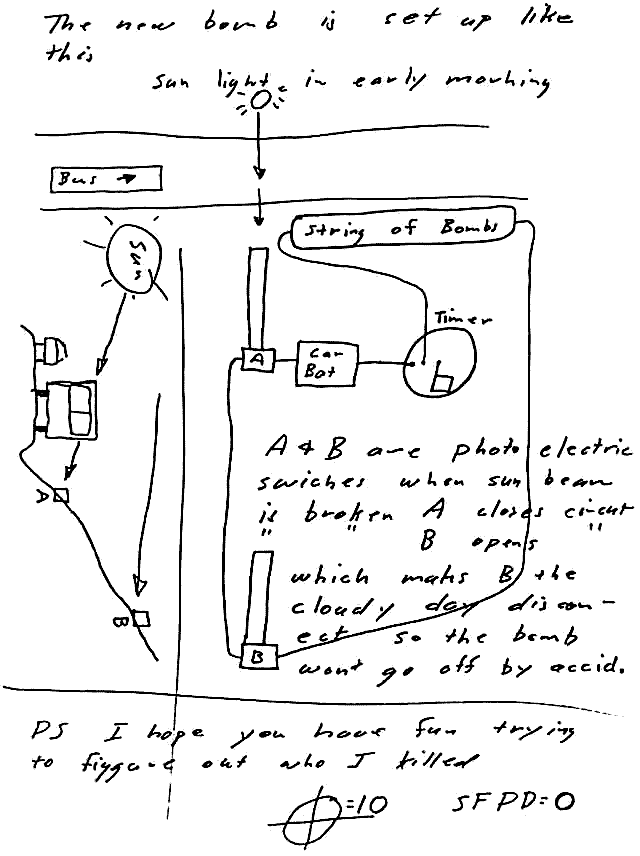
Bomb diagram, April 20, 1970

Dragon Card, postmarked April 28, 1970

In the same letter, the Zodiac denied responsibility for the fatal bombing of an SFPD police station in Golden Gate Park. He added, "there is more glory to killing a cop than a cid because a cop can shoot back." He also included a diagram of another school bus bomb. At the bottom of the diagram, he wrote: " = 10, SFPD = 0."

On April 28, 1970, the Zodiac mailed a greeting card to the Chronicle. He wrote, "I hope you enjoy yourselves when I have my BLAST." On the back of the card, the Zodiac threatened to use his bus bomb unless two things happened: the Chronicle should write about his bomb, and people should wear "some nice Zodiac butons".

=== June 1970 letter and map ===
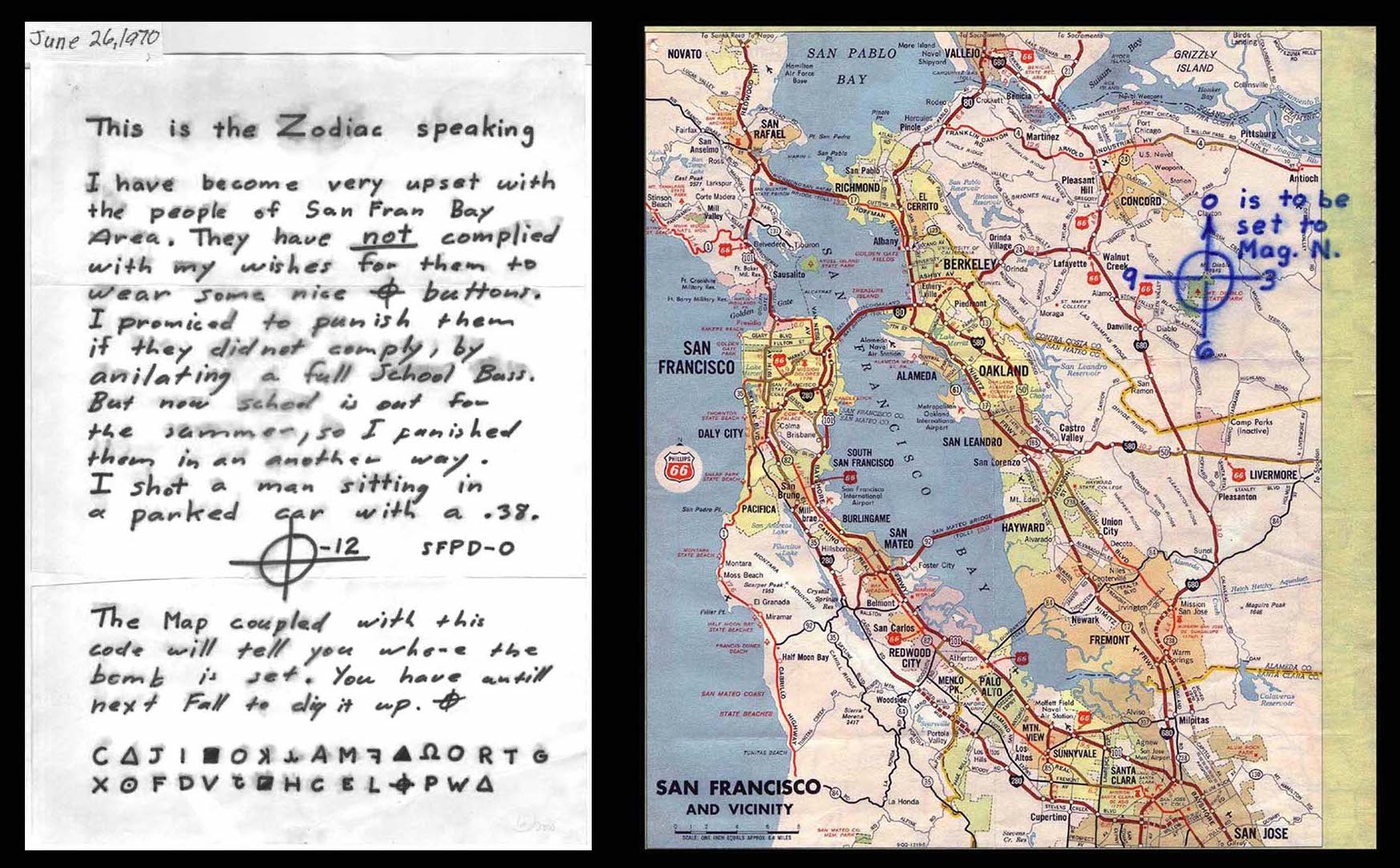
The Z32 cipher letter with its map of the Bay Area, June 26, 1970

In a letter to the Chronicle postmarked June 26, 1970, the killer was upset no one was wearing Zodiac buttons. He claimed, "...I punished them in another way. I shot a man sitting in a parked car with a .38." This may have been a reference to the murder of SFPD Sergeant Richard Radetich. He was shot through the window of his squad car by an unidentified gunman during a routine traffic stop. Radetich's murder is unsolved, but the SFPD denies that Zodiac is a suspect in the case.

A Phillips 66 roadmap of the San Francisco Bay Area was enclosed with the letter. At Mount Diablo, the Zodiac drew a modified symbol as a compass rose. The cardinal points were labeled 0, 3, 6, 9 clockwise from the top. The Zodiac confirmed that 0 "to be set to Mag. N."

The letter concluded with a 32-character cipher (Z32):

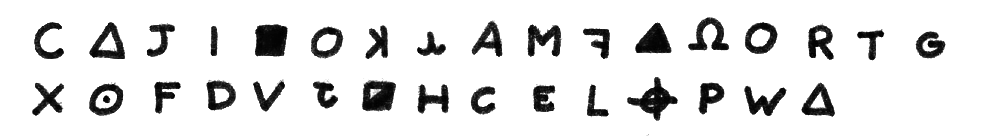

The Zodiac claimed that the map and the cipher would reveal where he had buried his bomb. Z32 has never been definitively decoded and no bomb was ever located. In another letter, the Zodiac explained, "The Mt. Diablo code concerns Radians + # inches along the radians." In 1981, Gareth Penn deduced that when the map was divided as per the Zodiac's hint, three of his attacks aligned along one radian. On one arm of the radian lay the Blue Rock Springs and Lake Herman Road murders. The other arm of the radian centered on Mount Diablo extended to the site of Paul Stine's murder.

Hundreds of solutions to the Z13 and Z32 have been proposed and, according to Oranchak, “it is practically impossible to determine if any of them are correct” due to how short the ciphers are.

=== July 1970 letters ===
In a letter postmarked July 24, 1970 to the Chronicle, the Zodiac again complained about no one wearing Zodiac-themed buttons. He claimed to have "a little list" of victims which included the woman and her baby he drove around for several hours. The details match Kathleen Johns' description of her abduction on March 22, four months earlier.

Two days later on July 26, the Zodiac mailed another letter to the Chronicle. He again parodied "As Some Day It May Happen (I Have a Little List)" from The Mikado, adding his own lyrics about his potential victims. The letter was signed with a large Zodiac symbol and a new score: " = 13, SFPD = 0". The letter's postscript explained the Mount Diablo code from his previous letter.

=== October 1970 cards ===
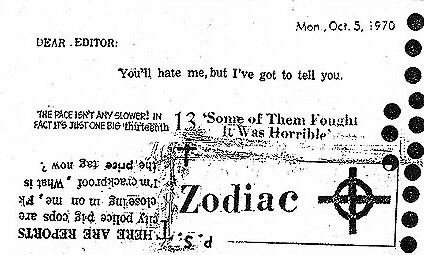
The "13 Hole Punch Card", October 7, 1970

The "Halloween Card", October 27, 1970

On October 7, 1970, the Chronicle received a three-by-five-inch card (nicknamed the "13 Hole Punch Card") signed by Zodiac with the symbol and a small cross reportedly drawn in blood. Thirteen holes were punched across the card, and its message was formed by pasting type from the Chronicle. Bill Armstrong and Dave Toschi agreed it was "highly probable" that Zodiac sent the card.

On October 27, 1970, Paul Avery received a Halloween card signed by "Z" alongside the symbol. A handwritten note read, "Peek-a-boo, you are doomed." The Chronicle covered this threat on its front page. The card's postmark was from a San Francisco mailbox that afternoon. The implication of a fourteenth Zodiac victim was speculated based on the phrase "4-teen" found in the card. Avery refused police protection and started carrying a pistol. His colleagues wore "I Am Not Avery" buttons. Shortly after the "Halloween Card", Avery also received an anonymous letter about the parallels between the 1966 murder of Cheri Jo Bates and the Zodiac.

=== March 1971 letter ===
In a March 13, 1971, letter to the Los Angeles Times, the Zodiac taunted police and claimed 17 victims. Zodiac expert Tom Voigt theorized that the letter's postmark was a joke about an unpleasant letter coming from a town called "Pleasanton".

=== January 1974 letter ===
Zodiac remained silent for nearly three years. The Chronicle received a letter from the Zodiac, postmarked January 29, 1974 from San Mateo County. It praised The Exorcist (1973) as "the best saterical comidy [sic] that I have ever seen." The letter included part of a verse from "Tit-willow Song" in The Mikado and an unusual symbol at the bottom that has remained unexplained. Zodiac concluded the letter with a new score, "Me = 37, SFPD = 0."

Psychiatrist David Van Nuys theorized Zodiac stopped killing because he had multiple personality disorder. It may have lessened over time as it often can, which would also explain the reduced intensity of Zodiac's letters.

== Letters of suspicious authorship ==
Many more unconfirmed Zodiac letters were sent to the media. On August 1, 1973, a letter was mailed to the Albany Times Union in New York. The return address was the symbol. The writer promised to kill again on August 10. A three-line code in the letter was supposed to reveal the name and location of the victim. FBI cryptanalysts deciphered the code as "[redacted by the FBI] Albany Medical Center. This is only the beginning." No murder matched the details in the letter, and the handwriting was not a definitive match for Zodiac's.

The Chronicle received a letter postmarked February 14, 1974, explaining that the Symbionese Liberation Army's initials spelled out an Old Norse word meaning "kill." The SLA had recently kidnapped newspaper heiress Patricia Hearst. The handwriting was not authenticated as the Zodiac's.

A letter to the Chronicle postmarked May 8, 1974, opined that Badlands (1973) was "murder-glorification" and asked the paper to remove its advertisements. Signed by "A citizen", the handwriting, tone and sarcasm were similar to Zodiac's letters. The Chronicle also received an anonymous letter postmarked July 8, 1974, complaining about antifeminist columnist Marco Spinelli. The letter was signed, "the Red Phantom (red with rage)".

A letter arrived at the Chronicle, postmarked May 6, 1986, with the author claiming to have killed 100+ people across California and Nevada. On October 27, 1987, the Vallejo Times Herald received a correspondence, with the author saying they will be "out driving around on Halloween in my death machine looking for some kiddies to run over". The authorship of these two letters is debated.

In 2007, an American Greetings Christmas card was discovered in the Chronicle's photo files. Its postmark was from 1990 in Eureka. The card was handed over to the Vallejo police. A photocopy of two United States Post Office keys on a magnet key chain was enclosed. The handwriting on the envelope resembled Zodiac's; however, a forensic document examiner deemed it inauthentic. The discovery electrified Zodiac researchers. It suggested the killing spree may not have been stopped by death or imprisonment and that the Zodiac might be alive.

== Other possible victims ==
Police have not reached a consensus regarding the total number of victims killed by the Zodiac, or the length of his criminal spree. In 1976, SFPD detective Dave Toschi said, "We know for sure he killed at least six", and the Zodiac had "a personal boxscore of 37". Robert Graysmith estimated 49 Zodiac victims. Many murders and attacks in the 1960s and 1970s were considered possible Zodiac crimes, but none have been confirmed.

=== Raymond Davis ===
On April 9, 1962, a man called police in Oceanside, California, and said, "I am going to pull something here in Oceanside and you'll never be able to figure it out." At 11:10 p.m. on April 10, cab driver Raymond Davis (29) told his dispatcher he was taking a fare to South Oceanside. The next day, his body was found near the mayor's house in St. Malo, a gated community in Oceanside. Days later, the suspected killer again called police, "Do you remember me calling you last week and telling you that I was going to pull a real baffling crime? I killed the cab driver and I am going to get me a bus driver next." Oceanside police immediately placed armed guards on buses.

In 2019, Kristi Hawthorne, the Director of the Oceanside Historical Society, connected Davis' murder to the Zodiac Killer. While researching St. Malo, Hawthorne discovered several similarities between Davis' murder and other confirmed murders by the Zodiac. Davis' murder preceded Paul Stine's by seven years. Both murders involved cab drivers in wealthy neighborhoods, both victims were 29 years old, and Davis's killer used .22 caliber bullets identical to the ammunition used in the Lake Herman Road murders. The killer also taunted police and threatened attacks on buses, both of which were tactics and behavior of Zodiac. Hawthorne presented her findings to the Oceanside Police Department, and OPD began an inquiry.

=== Robert Domingos and Linda Edwards ===
On June 2, 1963, an unidentified sniper shot at a group of teenagers on the beach at Tajiguas in Santa Barbara County, California. The sniper fired two shots from a .22 caliber weapon, but missed. Two days later, an unidentified person shot and killed two Lompoc High School students on a beach within Gaviota State Park, just west of Tajiguas. On June 4, Robert George Domingos (18) and his fiancée Linda Faye Edwards (17) were spending Senior Ditch Day at the beach. When the couple did not return home, their parents called police. Police conducted a search, and discovered Edwards's purse and several of the couple's belongings inside Domingos's car.

Based on the evidence at the scene, detectives believed the killer bound the couple with pre-cut rope, using the same modus operandi in the Lake Berryessa attacks. Detectives theorized the victims managed to free themselves, and the killer shot them repeatedly in their backs and chests as they tried to flee. Domingos was shot 11 times; Edwards was shot 8 times. The killer placed the bodies in a nearby shack, and set it afire. Police believed the weapon was a .22 caliber semi-automatic rifle, similar to the Tajiguas and Lake Herman Road incidents. Like Zodiac, the killer used Winchester Western Super X copper-coated ammunition. Investigators traced the ammunition lot number to a purchase in April from one of two locations: a store in Santa Barbara, or Vandenberg Air Force Base near Lompoc.

In a 1972 press conference, Santa Barbara County Sheriff John Carpenter stated "there now appears to be a high degree of probability" the Zodiac committed the murders, and "although the anticipated response to this statement would be one of skepticism, let me say we do not make this assertion frivolously." When SFPD detectives Bill Armstrong and Dave Toschi investigated the murders in 1972, Toschi said a connection is possible. A classmate of Domingos and Edwards, who later became a clinical psychologist and police officer, said in 2011, "I believe the murders were the work of the Zodiac killer, but I can't prove it."

=== Johnny Ray Swindle and Joyce Ann Swindle ===
On February 5, 1964, Johnny Ray Swindle and Joyce Ann Swindle (both 19), a newlywed couple from Alabama on their honeymoon, were shot while walking along Ocean Beach in San Diego. A sniper with a .22 caliber rifle shot them five times from a nearby cliff. The killer then shot each of them once in the head at close range. Similar to the Zodiac murders, Johnny was shot behind the ear. Despite multiple bullet wounds, he remained alive for hours and died at the hospital. Joyce died almost instantly from shots to her back, left arm, and head. The killer took Joyce's necklace, as well as Johnny's wallet and Timex watch—the same brand watch found at the Cheri Jo Bates crime scene, and assumed to belong to Bates's killer.

Johnny's mother said she could not think of him having any enemies. His sister theorized the Zodiac may have been the culprit. Police investigated a 51-year-old man living in a nearby beach shack, a teenager alleged by a priest to be violent, and a 19-year-old Marine from San Diego who killed his parents and sister in Illinois. Police speculated that the Swindles were victims of a "thrill killer", and they also saw a parallel with the Domingos and Edwards murders. In both the Santa Barbara and Ocean Beach killings, the victims were shot from a distance, then again at close range. Both the Ocean Beach and Lake Herman Road murders used a .22 Remington Arms Model 550-1 rifle, but the ballistics did not match between the cartridges found at the two scenes. The San Diego Reader noted that the murders at Lake Berryessa, Santa Barbara, and Ocean Beach were all near bodies of water.

=== Cheri Jo Bates ===
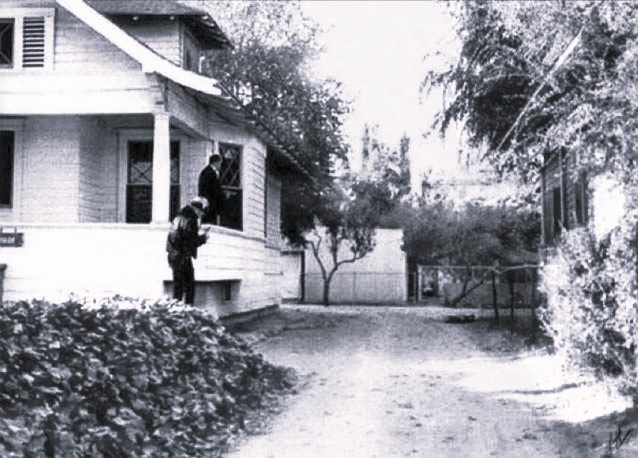
Officers from the Riverside Police Department examining the Bates crime scene at Terracina Drive, Riverside, in 1966. Bates' body lies at the right of the gravel path.

On October 30, 1966, Cheri Jo Bates, an 18-year-old student at Riverside City College (RCC), spent the evening at the campus library annex until it closed at 9:00 p.m. Neighbors reported hearing a scream around 10:30. Her father reported her missing, and she was found dead the next morning at 6:30 a.m. She was found a short distance from the library, between two abandoned houses slated to be demolished for campus renovations. She had been brutally beaten and stabbed to death. The wires in her Volkswagen's distributor cap had been pulled out. A man's paint-spattered Timex watch with a torn wristband was found nearby. The watch stopped at 12:24, but police believe that the attack had occurred much earlier.

One month later, on November 29, nearly identical typewritten letters were mailed to Riverside police and the Riverside Press-Enterprise, titled "The Confession." The author claimed responsibility for the Bates murder, providing details of the crime that were not released to the public. The author warned that Bates "is not the first and she will not be the last."

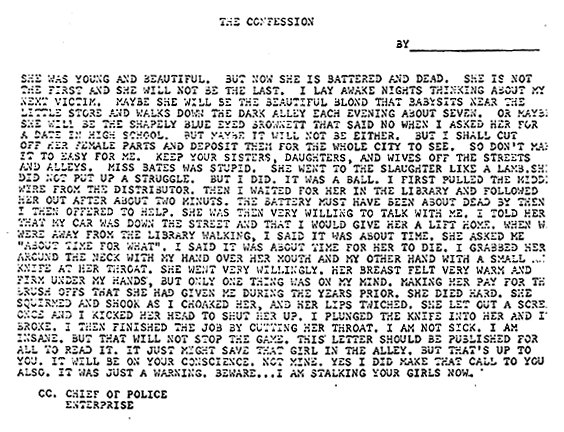
The typewritten confession received by the Riverside Police Department and The Press-Enterprise on November 29, 1966

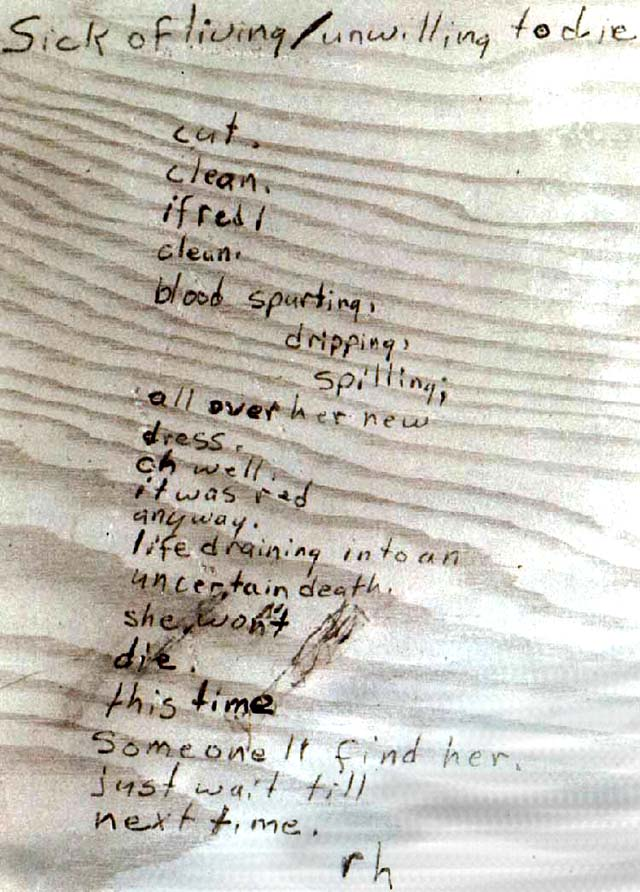
The inscription upon the Riverside City College library desk, discovered in 1967

In December 1966, a macabre poem was discovered carved into the bottom side of a desktop in the RCC library. Titled "Sick of living/unwilling to die," the poem's language and handwriting resembled that of the Zodiac's letters. It was signed with what were assumed to be a set of lowercase initials (r h) inscribed below. During the 1970 investigation, Sherwood Morrill, California's top "questioned documents" examiner, expressed his opinion that the poem was written by the Zodiac.

In 1970, Paul Avery wrote an article connecting the Zodiac to Bates' murder. Five months later, on March 13, 1971, the Zodiac mailed a letter to the Los Angeles Times, credited the police, instead of Avery, for discovering his "Riverside activity, but they are only finding the easy ones, there are a hell of a lot more down there." Zodiac's culpability in Bates' murder is unconfirmed.

=== Enedine Molina and Fermin Rodriguez ===
On June 8, 1967, Enedine Molina (35) and Fermin Rodriguez (36) were parked on Vallecitos Road in Alameda County, California. A stranger approached and told them to get out of the car. Rodriguez was fatally shot and Molina was abducted. The killer stopped near Sunol Regional Wilderness. Molina tried to escape and was killed. Rape and robbery were ruled out as motives. The murders occurred near Pleasanton. The March 1971 Zodiac letter to the Los Angeles Times was postmarked in Pleasanton.

=== John Franklin Hood and Sandra Garcia ===
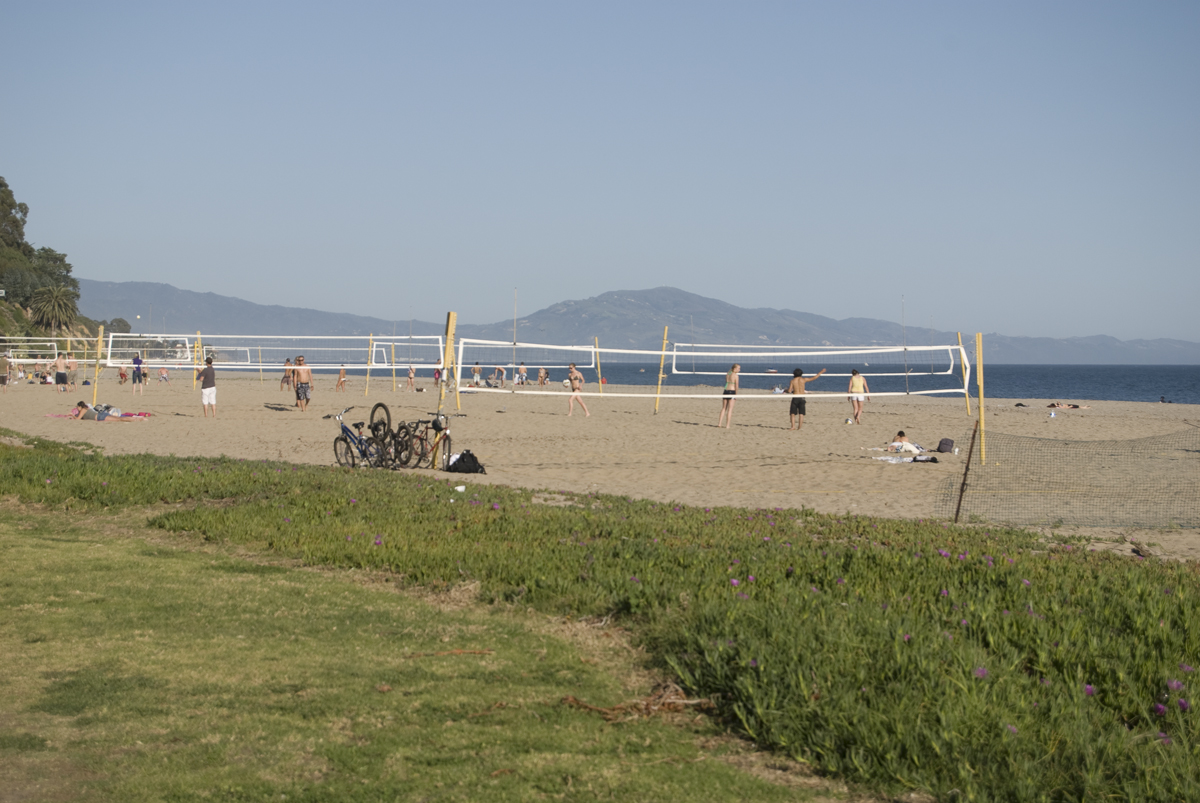
Santa Barbara's East Beach

On February 21, 1970, John Franklin Hood (24) and his fiancée, Sandra Garcia (20), visited East Beach in Santa Barbara. The couple left their Santa Barbara home at 6 p.m. Early the following day, their fully-clothed bodies were discovered under their blanket. Hood was stabbed eleven times, mainly in the face and back. Garcia received the brunt of the vicious attack, leaving her almost unrecognizable. The bone-handled 4-inch fish knife used in their murder was partially buried in the sand beneath the blanket. There appeared to be no sexual interference, and robbery was ruled out. The double-murder was similar to the 1963 killing of Domingos and Edwards, thirty miles west. It also paralleled the 1969 Lake Berryessa attack.

=== Kathleen Johns ===
On the night of March 22, 1970, Kathleen Johns (22) was driving to Petaluma, California, with her 10-month-old daughter. Johns was also seven months pregnant. She left San Bernardino at 4:30 p.m. At 11:30 p.m. on Highway 132 near Patterson, a vehicle behind her blinked its lights. A man pulled alongside and convinced her to pull over because her left rear wheel was loose. He fixed it, but when she pulled away it immediately fell off. Johns told Paul Avery that the man offered to drive her to a gas station that was in sight just up the road.

Johns asked the man if he always helped strangers this way. He replied, "By the time I get through with them, they won't need my help." He drove past the gas station and kept Johns captive for two hours. He told her repeatedly, "you know I'm going to kill you". When he abruptly stopped, Johns jumped out of the car with her infant and hid in an irrigation ditch. The man searched for her with a flashlight before leaving. A passing farmer drove Johns to a police station in Patterson. When she saw the Wanted poster from Paul Stine's murder, she exclaimed, "Oh my god...that's him". Johns's car was found in flames on Highway 132. A few months later, the Zodiac referenced this kidnapping in a letter to the Chronicle.

=== Richard Radetich ===
Around 5:25 a.m. on June 19, 1970, SFPD Sergeant Richard Phillip "Rich" Radetich (25) was shot three times by a .38 caliber revolver. He was serving a parking ticket in Haight-Ashbury when he was shot through the driver's window of his squad car. The SFPD started assigning two officers to every patrol car. A week later, the Zodiac claimed to have shot a man "in a parked car with a .38". Police never found direct evidence that Zodiac killed Radetich. In 2004, the SFPD reopened the Radetich investigation.

=== Donna Lass ===
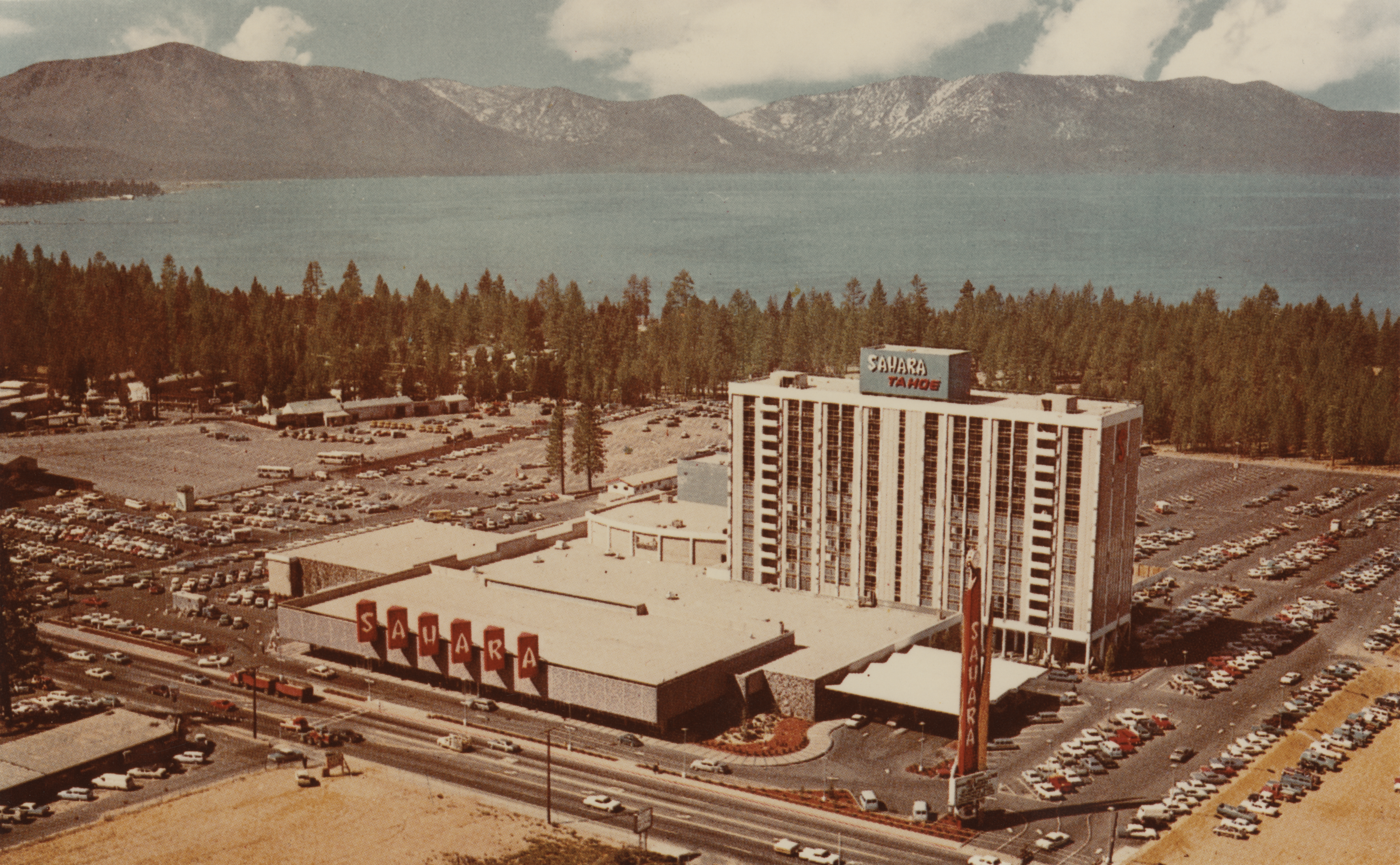
The Sahara Tahoe casino in Stateline, Nevada, in 1965

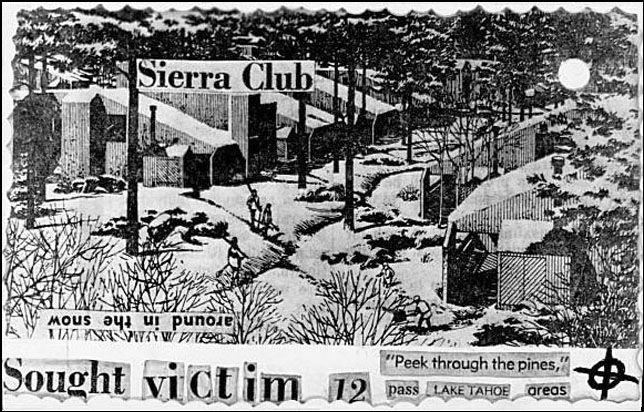
Lake Tahoe postcard sent to Paul Avery, March 22, 1971

Registered nurse Donna Lass (25) was last seen on September 6, 1970, in Stateline, Nevada. She worked at the Sahara Tahoe casino until 2:00 a.m. that morning. Her boss and landlord both received phone calls from an anonymous man who claimed Lass had an illness in her family and would not be returning. Her car was parked near her apartment, which was undisturbed.

Paul Avery received a Lake Tahoe postcard several months later with potential connections to Lass's disappearance. Like the "13-Hole Punch Card", placed over the original image is a collage of phrases like "Peek through the pines...around in the snow". It also said, "Sought Victim 12" and included the symbol.

In 1986, the Placer County, California, Sheriff's Office located a skull near Emigrant Gap along California State Route 20 in the Sierra Nevada. The South Lake Tahoe Police Department began investigating a connection to the Zodiac killing spree in 2001. DNA profiling determined it was Donna Lass's skull in 2023.

=== Potentially related serial murders ===
==== Astrological murders ====
The "Astrological Murders" were committed by a suspected serial killer who was also active in the same region of California and around the same time as the Zodiac. Police across multiple jurisdictions made a tentative connection between a single culprit and at least a dozen unsolved homicides that occurred between the late 1960s and early 1970s. All of the victims were female and were killed in a variety of ways, including strangulation, drowning, throat-cutting and bludgeoning, occasionally after being drugged. The killings were linked because victims were dumped in ravines and killed in conjunction with astrological events, such as the winter solstice, equinox and Friday the 13th.

==== Santa Rosa hitchhiker murders ====
The Zodiac was also suspected of being the perpetrator behind the Santa Rosa hitchhiker murders. Between 1972 and 1973, at least seven female hitchhikers were murdered in Sonoma County and Santa Rosa, California. In the Zodiac's January 29, 1974 "Exorcist letter" to the Chronicle, he claims thirty-seven victims. A symbol in that letter matched Chinese characters on a soy barrel carried by one of the Santa Rosa victims. The Zodiac had warned he would vary his modus operandi in a previous letter, "when I comitt [sic] my murders, they shall look like routine robberies, killings of anger, + a few fake accidents, etc."

One of the main Zodiac suspects, Arthur Leigh Allen, was also suspected of being the Santa Rosa killer.

== 21st-century developments ==
In 2002, Cydne Holt of the SFPD crime lab developed a partial DNA profile from saliva on stamps and envelopes of the Zodiac's letters – especially the stamp on the November 8, 1969, card – for the ABC News program Primetime Thursday. The DNA of prime Zodiac suspect Arthur Leigh Allen was not a match; however, in 2018, Zodiac researcher Tom Voigt claimed that the DNA material was obtained from the "outside of the stamp" and could belong to someone else other than the Zodiac.

In April 2004, the SFPD cited caseload pressure and marked the Zodiac case "inactive." By March 2007, they reactivated the case. The case remains open in Riverside and Napa County.

In 2010, Napa County failed to obtain Zodiac's DNA from items that were retrieved from the 1969 Lake Berryessa crime scene.

In 2018, the Vallejo Police Department attempted to use investigative genetic genealogy to catch the Zodiac, a method which led that year to the capture of serial killer Joseph James DeAngelo. They did not receive definitive results. The FBI's investigation was still ongoing as of 2021, although Voigt claims the case is no longer being investigated as of 2025.

== Suspects ==
In 2009, The Guardian reported that the SFPD had investigated an estimated 2,500 Zodiac suspects, and only a half-dozen of them were seen as credible by the department. Richard Grinell, who runs the website Zodiac Ciphers, stated in 2022 that "there are probably 50 or 100 suspects named every year."

The only man ever named by the police as a suspect is Arthur Leigh Allen, a former elementary school teacher and convicted sex offender who died in 1992. Allen denied being the Zodiac. He was interviewed by police from the early days of the investigation, and was subject to several related search warrants over a twenty-year period. In 2007, Robert Graysmith said that several detectives described Allen as the most likely suspect. In 2010, Dave Toschi stated that all the evidence against Allen ultimately "turned out to be negative." Other suspects widely seen as viable by professional or amateur investigators include Earl Van Best Jr., Gary Francis Poste, Giuseppe Bevilacqua, Lawrence Kane, Paul Doerr, Richard Gaikowski, Richard Marshall, and Ross Sullivan.

== Legacy ==
This is the case that won't go away. The killer's catch-me-if-you-can taunting of police, the mind-puzzlers he sent to the press, the way he dropped off the face of the Earth in the early 1970s combined to give the Zodiac case a legendary status that in some ways outstripped the magnitude of the murders.

— Michael Taylor

In 2020, the Chronicle called the Zodiac case "the most famous unsolved murder case in American history." The unusual nature of the spree has sustained international interest for years. A cottage industry of "Zodiologists" sprung up in the wake of the killings. They try to solve the case and have informal annual meetings. Several websites collect information about the crimes and ciphers.

Dozens of books and documentaries have focused on the Zodiac. The original and most influential amateur book was Robert Graysmith's Zodiac (1986). He was working at the San Francisco Chronicle as a cartoonist while the Zodiac was corresponding with the paper. Graysmith compiled his research into an authoritative investigation that remains a touchstone for other researchers.

Theories about the Zodiac's identity are rampant. In Zodiac, Graysmith refers to Arthur Leigh Allen as "Robert Hall Starr" to protect his identity and avoid litigation. In 2002, Graysmith wrote directly about Allen in Zodiac Unmasked. Attributing victims to the Zodiac is also a popular pastime. One Zodiologist has persistently claimed to also be a target of the killer. Since 2013, accusing United States Senator Ted Cruz of being the Zodiac has been a popular Internet meme.

The Zodiac inspired copycat killers like Heriberto Seda in New York City and Shinichiro Azuma in Japan, both of whom called themselves "the Zodiac". In 2021, an anonymous author sent letters to media outlets in Albany using a "Chinese Zodiac Killer" sobriquet.

Brian Draper and Torey Adamcik, who perpetrated the 2006 murder of Cassie Jo Stoddart, cited the Zodiac as one of their inspirations in their homemade videos.

=== Popular culture ===
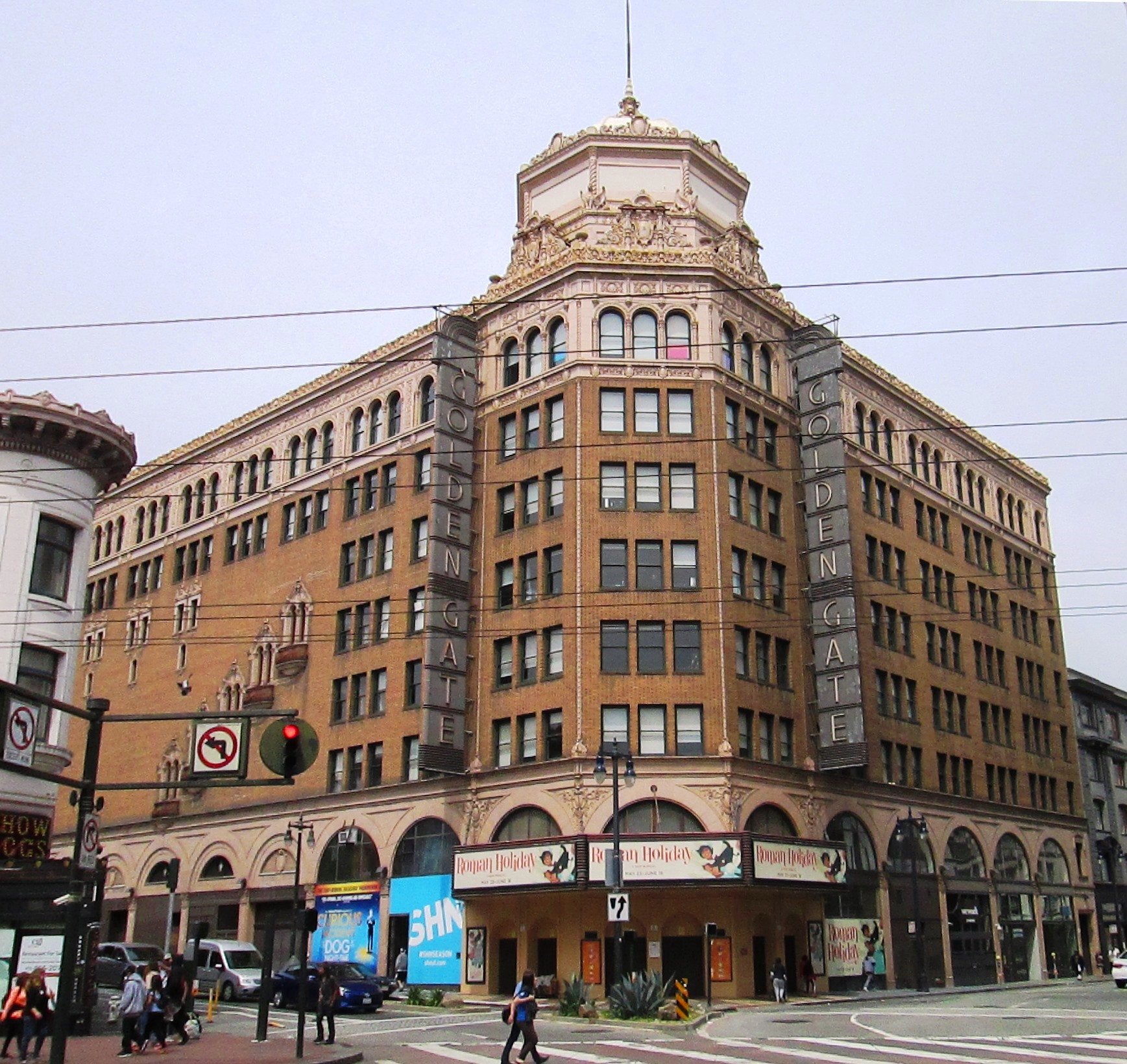
The Golden Gate Theater in San Francisco

The first film about the Zodiac Killer was produced two years after his last confirmed murder during his letter-writing campaign. Tom Hanson's The Zodiac Killer was made as a scheme to capture the culprit. The film premiered on April 19, 1971, at the Golden Gate Theater in San Francisco. The audience were given a survey with the prompt, "I think the Zodiac kills because..." They were asked to complete the sentence and promised the best response would be rewarded with a Kawasaki motorcycle. The audience surveys were secretly compared to the Zodiac's handwriting. Hanson hoped the killer's supposed egotism would lure him to the movie, and deployed volunteers to detain anyone whose handwriting matched the Zodiac's. The scheme lasted for several screenings, and in one, the volunteers actually confronted one potential suspect and held the suspect before releasing him due to lack of evidence.

The Zodiac has inspired villains in multiple movies, including Scorpio in Dirty Harry (1971), the Gemini Killer in The Exorcist III (1990), John Doe in Seven (1995), and the Riddler in The Batman (2022). The Zodiac case is also the subject of the film Zodiac (2007), directed by David Fincher, who also directed Seven. Fincher grew up in the Bay Area during the Zodiac killings. The film was an adaptation of Robert Graysmith's books, focusing on Graysmith and Paul Avery's investigation over 23 years. The filmmakers extensively researched the case, conducting interviews with people involved in the case. The film posits Arthur Leigh Allen's culpability and led to more public interest in the Zodiac.

== See also ==
- List of serial killers in the United States
- List of fugitives from justice who disappeared
- David Berkowitz
- Dennis Rader
