= The Ecphorizer =

The Ecphorizer was a literary journal originally published from 1981 to 1995 by members of San Francisco Regional Mensa, a local chapter of American Mensa. The annual subscription price of The Ecphorizer was $5.00. The size of the journal was 24 pages octavio.

The original mission of the magazine ran thus:

The Ecphorizer has been created to provide an intellectual forum for the members of San Francisco Regional Mensa — a place to listen and sound off, to hear and be heard. Our aim is to generate in print the same sort of stimulating views and interchanges that enliven good Mensa gatherings.

In 1983, The Ecphorizer creator, George Towner, had the journal listed in The International Directory of Little Magazines and Small Presses, effectively soliciting “Poetry, fiction, articles, satire, criticism, reviews, letters, non-fiction” from non-Mensa members, explaining “As the readership is primarily (but not exclusively) members of Mensa, material of interest to people of high intelligence is desired.” Circulation (in 1983) rose to 600.

Contributors included E. E. Rehmus and Gareth Penn.

Though the magazine is now defunct, its contents are preserved and made available at The Ecphorizer website.
