= E. E. Rehmus =

American linguist

- Born: June 1929; Upper Michigan, United States
- Died: March 2004 (aged 74); San Francisco
- Occupations: Writer, illustrator, occultist
- Partner: Joseph Haskew
- Writing career
- Language: English
- Subjects: Occult, language, mythology, religion
- Notable work: The Magician's Dictionary

E. E. Rehmus, also alternatively given as Ed Rehmus, Edward Rehmus or Edward E. Rehmus (June 1929 – March 2004), was an American occultist, linguist, Egyptologist, classicist, writer, editor, translator, illustrator, cartoonist, and occasional graphic artist primarily known for being the author of The Magician's Dictionary.

== Biography ==
=== Early life and youth ===
Joseph Haskew, his long-term partner, wrote of Rehmus's early life and youth:

Edward, an only child, was born midsummer's eve 1929 in Upper Michigan, of German ancestry. His father was a musician, a pianist, who played in the "Big Bands" and his mother was a housewife. They were "modern" for their time, spending time in restaurants and night clubs, and, aside from the usual love and nurturing, were unexceptional parents, so the child was left to his own devices, resulting in a lively imagination. Later, when they moved to Detroit, they lived in a mainly Jewish neighborhood, and Ed attributed to this experience a lifelong love of learning and solid study habits.
The family moved to southern California, in the late 1940s, where he found the ambience suffocating and so resolved to get away whenever the opportunity arose. When his mother died, he went to Tulane for a brief spell, then into the U.S. Army (for an even briefer spell), then to San Francisco. He went to the University of California at Berkeley off and on for many years, but always became bored and so never pursued a degree.

=== Maturity ===
Haskew further adds:

His life in San Francisco was in the company of the Bohemian intelligentsia of writers, artists, poets, philosophers, and metaphysicians, and in those days San Francisco was a hotbed of post-war intellectual ferment. Over the years he studied extensively in comparative religions, comparative languages, psychology, and Eastern philosophy, among other disciplines. Always he kept up his writing, his correspondence, his teaching, and his translations. Occasionally he would find a book that he felt had particular merit, that had no English language version in print and he would translate it, for free because he felt it needed a wider audience. This might take six months, or a couple of years, but no matter – "It's important."

=== Involvement with High-IQ societies ===
As a polymath and philomath, Rehmus was actively involved with the quest to understand and expand human intelligence, himself being a member of several high-IQ support groups. Among these affiliations was his involvement with the San Francisco area Mensa society; he often contributed to that local society's publication, The Ecphorizer. His contributor notice from The Ecphorizer runs thus:

Ed Rehmus was well-known within San Francisco Regional Mensa in the 70s through the 80s as the "weird" cover artist of the newsletter Intelligencer. He later created an irregular comic strip called "The Clonies." Ed also wrote the occasional story for the Intelligencer.

=== Author of The Magician's Dictionary ===
His public reputation rests mainly on his contribution to the study of the occult through his renowned book The Magician's Dictionary, a vast pseudo-encyclopaedic work first published in 1990 that proposes a re-evaluation of some of the core building blocks of modern belief structures through definition and commentary on key words and phrases, from "Aaron" to "Zuvuya".

=== Other activities ===
Apart from founding and editing various magazines and journals (sometimes under pseudonyms), Rehmus was a regular contributor to numerous and diverse scholarly and amateur publications, providing articles, texts, artworks, and even erudite crossword puzzles. While he remained an obscure figure to the public eye during his lifetime, the posthumous volume The Magic of Ed Rehmus, compiled and edited by Fred Vaughan and published in 2006, sheds light on his personal life and many other previously inaccessible aspects of his thought, wide interests, and activities.

== Selected works ==
(Note: It is now known that Rehmus' academic, intellectual, and artistic production is much larger than accounted for in this article. Those interested in obtaining further information pertaining to his works are directed to Fred Vaughan's The Magic of Ed Rehmus, and especially the "Forward" (pages xi–xii), which contains more than the list provided here, albeit lacking a formal bibliography. The following list of works, considerably incomplete, is limited to those observed and verified.)

=== Books and articles ===
- I'm Over Here. Sausalito: Contact Editions/Angel Island Publications, 1962.
- The Magician's Dictionary: An Apocalyptic Cyclopaedia of Advanced Magic(k)al Arts and Alternate Meanings. 1st edition. Los Angeles: Feral House, March 1990. ISBN 0-922915-01-6. ISBN 978-0-922915-01-9.
- The Magician's Dictionary: An Apocalyptic Cyclopaedia of Advanced Magic(k)al Arts and Alternate Meanings. 2nd edition. October 1996. (Available on-line here.)
- The Magic of Ed Rehmus. Edited by Fred Vaughan. Seattle: Russell Vaughan, 2006. (Note: Some material from this book was posthumously posted between 2006 and 2007 as contributions from Edward Rehmus on the "Reason and Rhyme" blog. Fred Vaughan, who owns the rights to Rehmus' written materials (see The Magic of Ed Rehmus, "Forward", page xii), is an active member of the blog as well as being an editor and publisher.) (Available to download here and to buy from Lulu.com.)

=== Contributions to The Ecphorizer ===
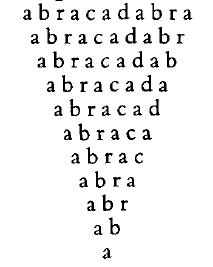
Gradual and triangular decomposition of the magical formula "Abracadabra"

- "Sermon No. P=P+1 (IF P=502 THEN 86)". The Ecphorizer, Issue 26, October 1983.
- "Prognosis Negative". The Ecphorizer, Issue 28, December 1983.
- "The Miracle of Pennsylvania Avenue". The Ecphorizer, Issue 29, January 1984.
- "Tennis, Anyone?". The Ecphorizer, Issue 30, February 1984.
- "Porphyry & Pomegranates". The Ecphorizer, Issue 41, January 1985.
- "Deeper Into Hemp". The Ecphorizer, Issue 42, February 1985.
- "An Aëroplane for Icarus (An Achronism) I". The Ecphorizer, Issue 43, March 1985.
- "An Aëroplane for Icarus (An Achronism) II". The Ecphorizer, Issue 44, April 1985.
- "An Aëroplane for Icarus (An Achronism) III". The Ecphorizer, Issue 46, June 1985.
- "An Aëroplane for Icarus (An Achronism) IV". The Ecphorizer, Issue 47, July 1985.
- "An Aëroplane for Icarus (An Achronism) V". The Ecphorizer, Issue 48, August 1985.
- "An Aëroplane for Icarus (An Achronism) VI". The Ecphorizer, Issue 49, September 1985.
- "An Aëroplane for Icarus (An Achronism) VII". The Ecphorizer, Issue 50, October 1985.
- "An Aëroplane for Icarus (An Achronism) VIII". The Ecphorizer, Issue 51, November 1985.
- "An Aëroplane for Icarus (An Achronism) IX". The Ecphorizer, Issue 52, December 1985.
- "The Cream of Christ ". The Ecphorizer, Issue 54, February 1986.
- "Seven Heavens". The Ecphorizer, Issue 55, March 1986.
- "Your Roving Wordsleuth". The Ecphorizer, Issue 59, October 1986.
- "Harry J. Anslinger". The Ecphorizer, Issue 62, January 1987.
- "Two Cosmologies". The Ecphorizer, Issue 63, February 1987.
- "The Nature of Translation". The Ecphorizer, Issue 69, August 1987.
- "The Something-From-Nothing World". The Ecphorizer, Issue 70, September 1987.

=== Translations ===
- Evola, Julius. The Hermetic Tradition: Symbols and Teachings of the Royal Art. Trans. by E. E. Rehmus. Rochester: Inner Traditions, 1995. ISBN 0-89281-451-9. ISBN 978-0-89281-451-0. (Link to the Inner Traditions website's book page).
- Vincenot, Henri. The Prophet of Compostela: A Novel of Apprenticeship and Initiation. Trans. by E. E. Rehmus. Rochester: Inner Traditions, 1995. ISBN 0-89281-524-8. ISBN 978-0-89281-524-1. (Link to the Inner Traditions website's book page. Limited preview available on-line from Google Books here. )
