= The Zodiac Killer (film) =

1971 American serial killer film directed by Tom Hanson

- Theatrical poster
- Directed by: Tom Hanson
- Written by: Ray Cantrell; Manny Cardoza
- Produced by: Tom Hanson
- Starring: Hal Reed; Bob Jones; Ray Lynch; Tom Pittman
- Cinematography: Robert Birchall; Wilson S. Hong
- Music by: Dennis Thomann
- Distributed by: Adventure Productions, Inc.
- Release date: April 7, 1971
- Running time: 87 minutes
- Country: United States
- Language: English

The Zodiac Killer is a 1971 slasher film directed by Tom Hanson and starring Hal Reed, Bob Jones, Ray Lynch and Tom Pittman. The plot is based on the murders committed by the Zodiac Killer in the San Francisco area, though it takes many liberties with the actual investigation with the film providing a name and back story for the killer.

== Plot ==
The film is a highly fictionalized telling of a month in the life of the Zodiac Killer (played by Hal Reed). The film follows the killer (whose identity as the Zodiac Killer is not revealed until the end of the first act of the film) and a friend, Grover (a drunk, toupée-wearing truck driver who is divorced from his wife and in financial trouble from his divorce) as they meet and go about their normal day. Grover eventually has a nervous breakdown due to the upheaval in his life caused by his divorce, as he is denied the right to visit his daughter when he makes a surprise visit to his ex-wife. Taking his daughter hostage, the police are called and as he tries to escape, Grover sees the day's paper laying on the front steps announcing another murder by the Zodiac Killer. In a fit of madness, he declares himself the Zodiac Killer and lets his daughter go in order to flee. The police shoot him dead as he falls into a nearby pool.

The second act of the film follows the real Zodiac Killer, who the film positions as having a day job as a much put upon postal carrier. The death of his friend causes him to phone the police to announce that the man they killed was not the Zodiac Killer, then goes about a major killing spree culminating in him murdering a pair of lovers in a park. The film also portrays him as a Satanist and one who actively kills those in his personal life who mock him or are mean to him in his normal life or who he hears mock his alter-ego.

The final act of the film attempts to provide a motive for the crime. The Zodiac Killer visits his father in a hospital, where he is kept in a caged room on the top floor. It is implied that the Zodiac's father is mentally ill and has to be restrained 24/7 and refuses any verbal communication with his son. The Zodiac Killer begs for his father to talk to him only to be rebuked. The staff of the facility ask the Zodiac Killer to leave, claiming his presence "upsets" his father. On his way out, the Zodiac Killer takes out his anger on two patients, wounding one and killing another.

The film ends with a voice over monologue as the Zodiac Killer goes about his normal routine. The Zodiac Killer brags about how he will never be caught and taunts the viewers of the film telling them that other monsters like himself lurk out there, able to blend in with normal people to avoid being caught while doing evil.

== Cast ==
- Hal Reed as Jerry
- Bob Jones as Grover
- Ray Lynch as Sgt. Pittman
- Tom Pittman as Officer Heller
- Mary Darrington as First Murder
- Frank Sanabek as Joe
- Ed Quigley as Tony
- Bertha Dahl as Mrs. Crocker
- Dion Marinkovich as Helen
- Doodles Weaver as Doc
- Gloria Gunn as Marilyn
- Richard Styles as Judd
- Manny Cardoza as Hippy
- Norma Takaki as Lakey
- Donna Register as Donna

== Production & Release ==
In interviews in 2012 and 2017, Hanson revealed the film's production was part of an elaborate plot to catch The Zodiac who, reasoned Hanson, would not be able to resist attending the film's premier. On April 7, 1971, the movie opened at San Francisco's RKO Golden Gate Theater, and featured a contest to win a motorcycle donated by Kawasaki. Moviegoers entering the theater were given cards printed with, "I think the Zodiac kills because," invited to complete the phrase, and drop their entries into a large box. Inside the box, a volunteer read each entry as it was slipped through the slot, and compared the handwriting on the cards to samples of The Zodiac's handwriting. If the volunteer spotted a suspicious card, plainclothes police officers would be notified to apprehend and interrogate anyone claiming to be The Zodiac or whose handwriting was similar to The Zodiac's.

=== Home media ===
The Blu-ray for The Zodiac Killer was released on July 25, 2017, by the American Genre Film Archive and Something Weird Video. The Zodiac Killer was the first film restored by the American Genre Film Archive. Special features on the Blu-ray include a commentary track and an interview with director Tom Hanson and actor Manny Nedwick.
