= Tom Hanson (actor) =

American actor

- Years active: 1966-1971

Tom Hanson is an American actor and director.

== Filmography ==
=== Director ===
- The Zodiac Killer (1971)
- A Ton of Grass Goes to Pot (1972)

=== Actor ===
- Night Train To Mundo Fine (1966)
- The Hellcats (1967)
- The Zodiac Killer (1971)
