= Cryptogram =

Puzzle

Example cryptogram. When decoded it reads: "Style and structure are the essence of a book; great ideas are hogwash." -Vladimir Nabokov

A cryptogram is a type of puzzle that consists of a short piece of encrypted text. Generally the cipher used to encrypt the text is simple enough that the cryptogram can be solved by hand. Substitution ciphers where each letter is replaced by a different letter, number, or symbol are frequently used. To solve the puzzle, one must recover the original lettering. Though once used in more serious applications, they are now mainly printed for entertainment in newspapers and magazines.

Other types of classical ciphers are sometimes used to create cryptograms. An example is the book cipher, where a book or article is used to encrypt a message.

== History ==
The ciphers used in cryptograms were created not for entertainment purposes, but for real encryption of military or personal secrets.

The first use of the cryptogram for entertainment purposes occurred during the Middle Ages by monks who had spare time for intellectual games. A manuscript found at Bamberg states that Irish visitors to the court of Merfyn Frych ap Gwriad (died 844), king of Gwynedd in Wales, were given a cryptogram which could only be solved by transposing the letters from Latin into Greek. Around the thirteenth century, the English monk Roger Bacon wrote a book in which he listed seven cipher methods, and stated that "a man is crazy who writes a secret in any other way than one which will conceal it from the vulgar." In the 19th century Edgar Allan Poe helped to popularize cryptograms with many newspaper and magazine articles.

Well-known examples of cryptograms in contemporary culture are the syndicated newspaper puzzles Cryptoquip and Cryptoquote, from King Features.

In a public challenge, writer J.M. Appel announced on September 28, 2014, that the table of contents page of his short story collection, Scouting for the Reaper, doubled as a cryptogram, and he pledged an award for the first to solve it.

== Solving a cryptogram ==
Cryptograms based on substitution ciphers can often be solved by frequency analysis and by recognizing letter patterns in words, such as one-letter words, which, in English, can only be "i" or "a" (and sometimes "o"). Double letters, apostrophes, and the fact that no letter can substitute for itself in the cipher also offer clues to the solution. Occasionally, cryptogram puzzle makers will start the solver off with a few letters.

A printed code key form (the alphabet with a blank under each letter to fill in the substituted letter) is usually not provided but can be drawn to use as a solving aid if needed. Skilled puzzle solvers should require neither a code key form nor starter clue letters.

== Other crypto puzzles ==
While the cryptogram has remained popular, over time other puzzles similar to it have emerged. One of these is the Cryptoquote, which is a famous quote encrypted in the same way as a cryptogram. A more recent version, with a biblical twist, is CodedWord. This puzzle makes the solution available only online, where it provides a short exegesis on the biblical text. A third is the Cryptoquiz. The top of this puzzle has a category (unencrypted), such as "Flowers". Below this is a list of encrypted words which are related to the stated category. The person must then solve for the entire list to finish the puzzle. Yet another type involves using numbers as they relate to texting to solve the puzzle.

The Zodiac Killer sent four cryptograms to police while he was still active. Despite much research, only two of these have been translated, which was of no help in identifying the serial killer.

== See also ==
- List of famous ciphertexts
- Musical cryptogram
- American Cryptogram Association
- Verbal arithmetic
