= Ted Cruz's speech at the 2016 Republican National Convention =

American political speech

- Cruz at the convention lectern during his speech
- Date: July 20, 2016; 10 years ago
- Duration: 27 minutes
- Venue: Quicken Loans Arena
- Location: Cleveland, Ohio

On July 20, 2016, at the 2016 Republican National Convention, Ted Cruz (the runner-up of the 2016 Republican Party presidential primaries) delivered a lengthy prime time address. In his speech, Cruz notably failed to endorse the party's presidential nominee, Donald Trump. The convention speech followed a primary race in which the two exchanged heated attacks. Cruz's speech received great applause up until the convention crowd had realized that he was not endorsing Trump, after which point he was bombarded by jeers and boos. Cruz initially resisted pressure to endorse Trump after his speech. However, two months later he offered an endorsement.

== Background ==
Cruz campaigning for president

Trump campaigning during the primaries

Cruz had been the runner-up in the Republican presidential primaries, losing to Donald Trump (whose nomination was made official at the convention). During the primaries, Cruz and other candidates had made a blanket pledge to back the party's eventual nominee if they lost.

Initially, Cruz and Trump maintained a mutually-convenient peace as candidates in the primaries. This prevented them from angering each other's supporters. As the campaign dragged on, and the field narrowed without Trump losing a lead or Cruz being pressured out of the field, their once-convenient public peace began fracturing, and the two began criticizing each other on the campaign trail and on debate stages. In a January 2016 debate that marked an escalation to this fracture, Cruz accused Trump of having liberal "New York values", while Trump (inaccurately) alleged that Cruz's birth in Canada meant he possibly failed to meet the "natural born citizen" requirement for eligibility to hold the presidency.

After Cruz won Iowa caucuses, Trump alleged that Cruz had "stolen" the caucuses through fraud. Trump claimed Cruz had only won by misleading supporters of the campaign of Ben Carson into believing Carson was planning to withdraw from the race; and called for the Cruz victory to be nullified.

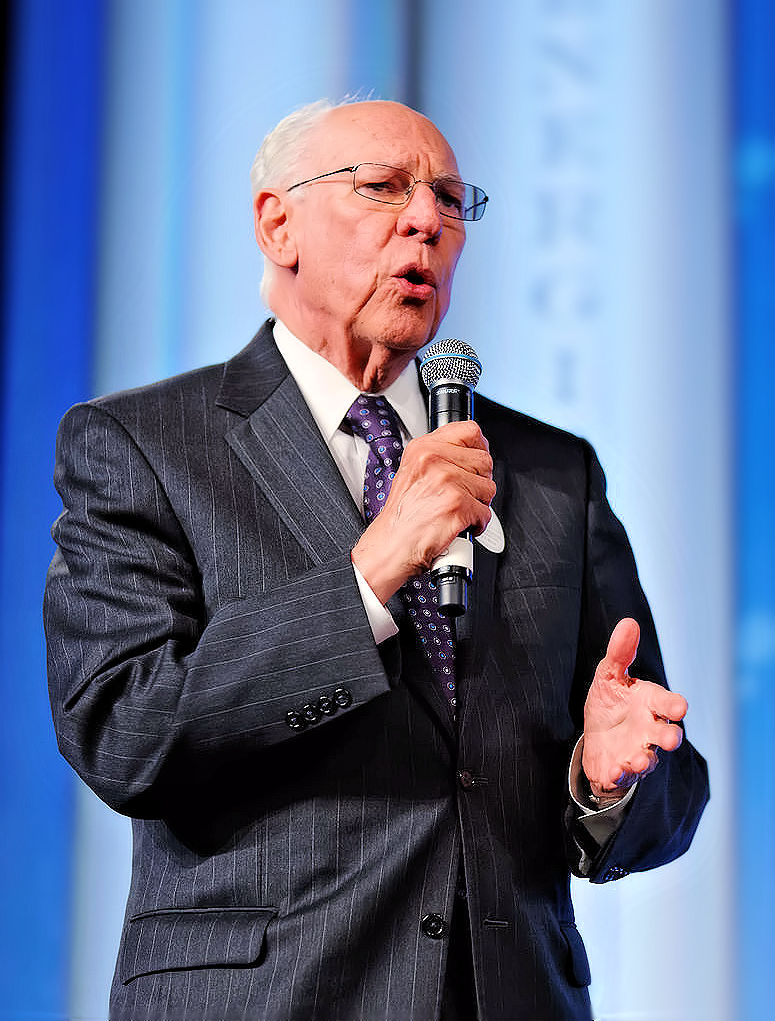
Cruz had pushed back against Trump's attacks on his wife, Heidi (left), and his father, Rafael (right).

Trump had labeled Cruz "Lyin' Ted". Trump had insulted the appearance of Cruz's wife, Heidi. In response to this attack on his wife, Cruz called Trump a, "sniveling coward". Ahead of the Indiana primary, Trump falsely suggested that Cruz's father (Rafael Cruz) had been involved in the assassination of John F. Kennedy. This was repeating an unsubstantiated story planted in the National Enquirer. In response to this, Cruz called Trump a "pathological liar" and "serial philanderer". During the 2024 Manhattan criminal trial of Trump, National Enquirer publisher David Pecker testified under oath that the story was false and had been fabricated by the publication as part of efforts in collaboration with Michael Cohen, a personal fixer for Trump, to print headlines beneficial to the Trump campaign.

Cruz had been endorsed in the Indiana primary by the state's governor, Mike Pence. After losing the Indiana primary, Cruz suspended his presidential candidacy, ultimately finishing a distant second to Trump in the delegate count of the primaries. Trump subsequently selected Pence to be his running mate in the 2016 presidential election. Pence delivered his vice presidential nomination acceptance speech later the same evening as Cruz's speech.

By the time of the convention, Cruz remained one of the most prominent Republican politicians yet to give an endorsement of Trump. Most Republicans with ambitions for future presidential runs had already embraced Trump as the party's 2016 nominee. Cruz was regarded as likely planning to run for president again in 2020 if Trump were to lose the general election in 2016. Some officials inside the Republican Party even speculated at the time that he was intent on running in the 2020 primaries regardless of whether Trump lost or won in 2016.

== Summary of speech ==
Cruz approaching the lectern at the start of his speech

In a prime time convention speaking slot, Cruz delivered a lengthy (27 minutes long) speech centered upon acclaiming the virtue of the conservative principles Cruz personally touted. It also focused on assailing the Democratic Party and its presumptive presidential nominee, Hillary Clinton." The speech also spoke about the shooting of Dallas police officers weeks earlier.

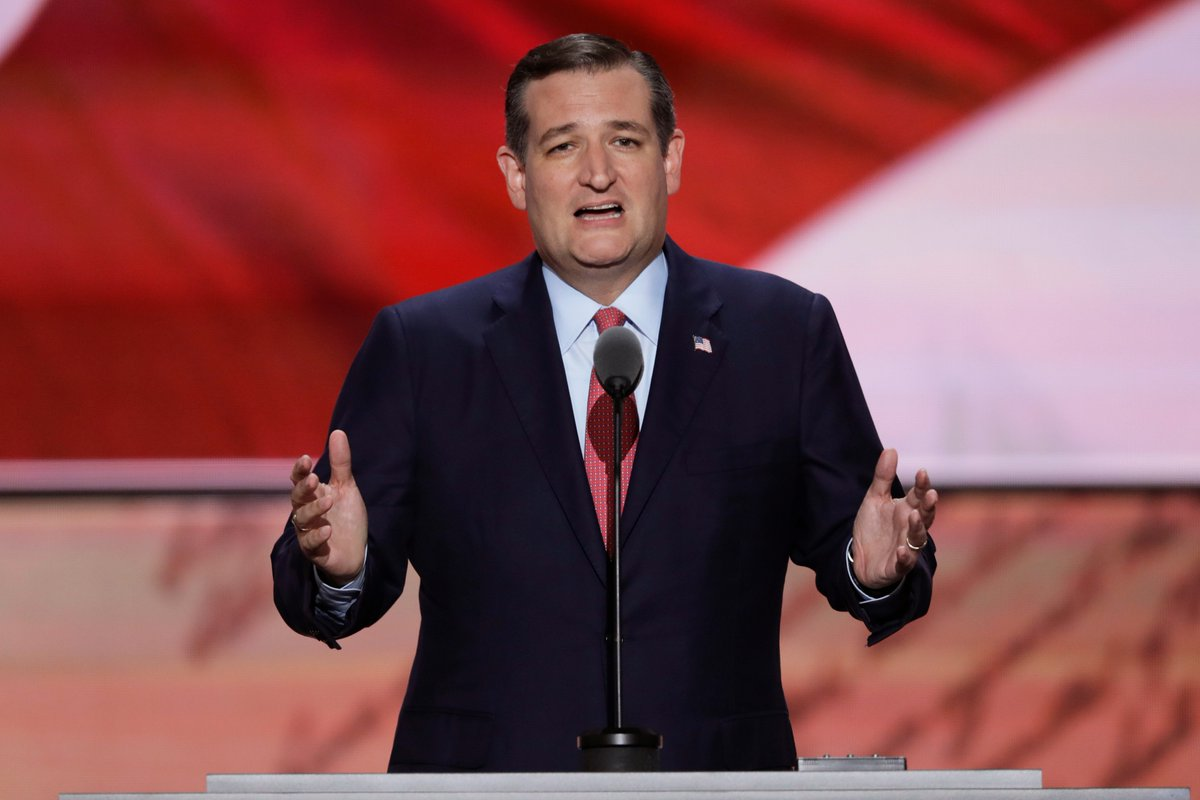
Cruz delivering his remarks

While Cruz briefly congratulated Trump on securing the nomination towards the start of the speech, he did not deliver an endorsement of Trump's presidential candidacy. His congratulations early in his speech was the only mention made of Trump. Instead of endorsing Trump, Cruz urged Republicans not to "stay home in November" and to "vote your conscience, vote for candidates up and down the ticket who you trust to defend our freedom and to be faithful to the Constitution." Cruz also remarked, "I want to see the principles that our party believes prevail in November".

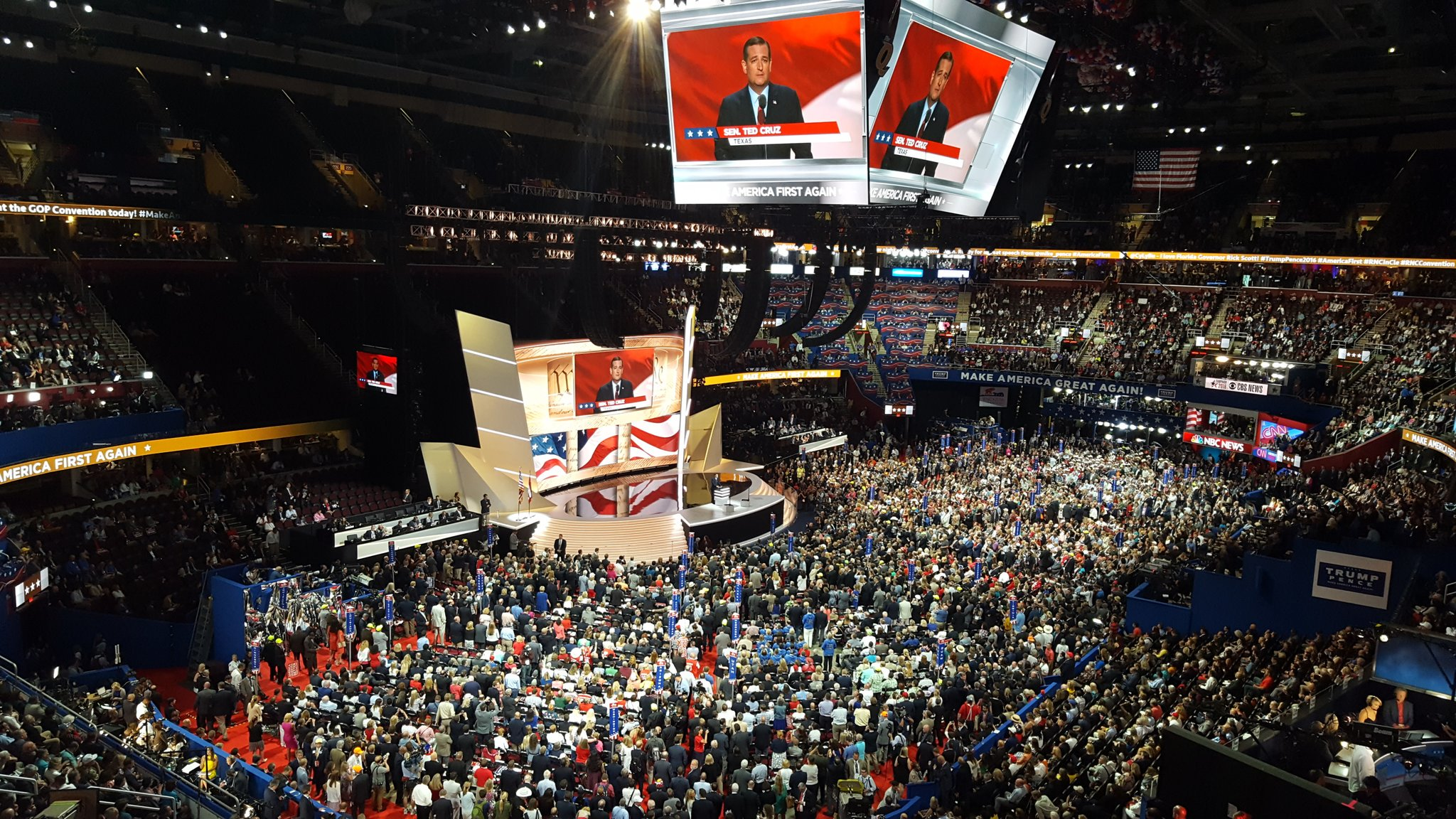
Convention hall during the speech

For much of its duration, the speech attracted significant applause. However; this changed towards the end of the speech when the crowd (including many Trump-pledged delegates) had realized that Cruz was not endorsing Trump in his remarks. Upon this collective realization, large portions of the crowd booed and jeered Cruz, with audible jeers including "say [Trump's] name", and "go home", "we want Trump", "endorse Trump!", and "endorse". There were audible chants of "say it" and "vote for Trump". Recognizing the onslaught of jeers, Cruz made an impromptu comment about excusing the outbursts as being due to the enthusiasm of the delegates from Trump's home state of New York (who were seated upfront near the stage). Around the same time that the crowd began to turn on Cruz, Trump entered the seating bowl and took his seat in his family's private box. In the audience at the end of the speech, Trump was seen sitting stone faced beside his own adult children.

As Cruz ended his speech, his wife was escorted from the seating bowl by convention security personnel and by Cruz advisor Ken Cuccinelli, fearing for her safety. As she left, she faced direct jeers herself. At least one convention goer was heard shouting "Goldman Sachs" disparagingly at her, naming her employer.

As Cruz left the stage at the end of his speech, showered with boos, he gave waves and a thumbs up gesture.

== Aftermath ==
The speech drew some initial comparison to Ted Kennedy's "The Dream Shall Never Die" speech at the 1980 Democratic National Convention. Similar to Cruz in 2016, Kennedy was the runner-up for the Democratic Party presidential nomination, and delivered a convention speech in which he outlined his ideological vision without offering an immediate endorsement of the nominee. Some comparison was also made to Nelson Rockefeller's speech at the 1964 Republican National Convention, in which he criticized the stances of presidential nominee Barry Goldwater.

After the speech, Michael Cohen, Trump's fixer and campaign counsel, claimed Cruz had "committed political suicide". Trump bragged on Twitter about the barrage of jeers Cruz had faced towards the end of his speech, "Wow, Ted Cruz got booed off the stage." Newt Gingrich, who spoke following Cruz, said: "I had the text of what Ted Cruz was gonna say, and I thought it was funny," Gingrich said. "I mean, Ted gets up and he says, 'Look, vote your conscience for someone who will support the Constitution.' Well, in this particular election year, that by definition cannot be for Hillary Clinton."

The speech was regarded to be a major moment of convention-stage drama not seen in decades, as recent conventions had been more carefully curated and scripted affairs. It garnered major media attention, as a result. The New York Times described the speech and its reception as "the most electric moment of the convention". Trump had invited Cruz to speak without requiring a commitment to endorse, and Trump and his team were given two days advance notice by Cruz that his speech was not going to contain an endorsement. Political commentators raised question why the Trump campaign would allow Cruz a high-profile convention speaking slot without assurances of an endorsement.

After his speech, Cruz was heckled in the arena corridors. He was also refused entry to the luxury suite of casino magnate and Republican superdonor Sheldon Adelson. Cruz again faced verbal backlash at a meeting of Texas delegates the following morning. CNN labeled this, "a remarkable 25-minute back-and-forth with his own constituents, defying appeals from his own Texas delegation to put the party above his inhibitions and back Trump." Cruz told the Texas delegates, "I am not in the habit of supporting people who attack my wife and attack my father," and claimed that he had days earlier informed Trump that he was not planning to endorse him, and he would have withdrawn from making a speech at the convention if Trump's campaign had asked him to. Cruz defended his non-endorsement as not violating his earlier pledge to back the eventual nominee, remarking, "That was not a blanket commitment that if you go and slander and attack Heidi, that I'm going to nonetheless come like a servile puppy dog and say, 'thank you very much for maligning my wife and maligning my father'". Cruz, however, clarified that he would not be voting for Hillary Clinton.

Columnist Ruben Navarrette of the Statesman Journal praised Cruz as being "courageous" and a "man of principle" following the speech.

Opinion polling registered a significant rise in Cruz's unpopularity among Republican voters coming out of the convention. After his speech, Cruz was immediately faced with Republican pressure to endorse. Analysts speculated on whether his non-endorsement hurt his political future due to Republican Party backlash, or whether it would aid his future by insulating him from being saddled with Trump-related baggage if Trump were to lose the election. Journalists described Cruz as having made a risky "gamble". Cruz faced significant backlash from Republicans, including negative reactions from prominent Republicans supporting Trump. New Jersey governor and former presidential candidate Chris Christie called the speech "awful" and "selfish." New York Representative Peter T. King called Cruz a "fraud" and a "self-centered liar." Senator Dan Coats of Indiana responded that Cruz was a "self-centered, narcissistic, pathological liar." Representative Marsha Blackburn of Tennessee, when asked about Cruz's speech, responded that she "would tell [Cruz] the same thing I would tell my kids, 'get over yourself.'" Susan Hutchison, chair of the Washington State Republican Party, confronted Cruz after his speech and labeled Cruz a "traitor to the party." Conservative radio host Rush Limbaugh speculated that Cruz was trying to mimic Ronald Reagan's speech at the 1976 Republican National Convention, in that "he wanted to deliver a speech that was Reaganesque in that the delegates would walk out of there thinking that they should have nominated him. He didn't get there." Instead, Limbaugh compared his speech to Ted Kennedy's at the 1980 Democratic National Convention, arguing Cruz had similarly put his own interests ahead of the interests of his party. In the wake of Cruz's non-endorsement of Trump, his critics believed that an intraparty challenge could be possible. Republican donors and Texas politicians asked Representative Mike McCaul to run to unseat him in the next cycle's Texas U.S. Senate primary in 2018, before McCaul declined to run.

On September 23, 2016, Cruz endorsed Trump's campaign, posting on Facebook,

After many months of careful consideration, of prayer and searching my own conscience, I have decided that on Election Day, I will vote for the Republican nominee, Donald Trump. A year ago, I pledged to endorse the Republican nominee, and I am honoring that commitment. And if you don’t want to see a Hillary Clinton presidency, I encourage you to vote for him.

Cruz (right) with Trump, in September 2024

In the years that followed, Cruz positioned himself as a loyalist to Trump and Trumpism. Cruz has aided Trump in the years first, including advising Trump's defense efforts during his first impeachment trial and leading Senate efforts to object to the certification of Trump's loss in the 2020 United States presidential election. Despite his subsequent embrace of Trump, the convention snub has remained famous.
