= Ted Cruz =

American politician and attorney (born 1970)

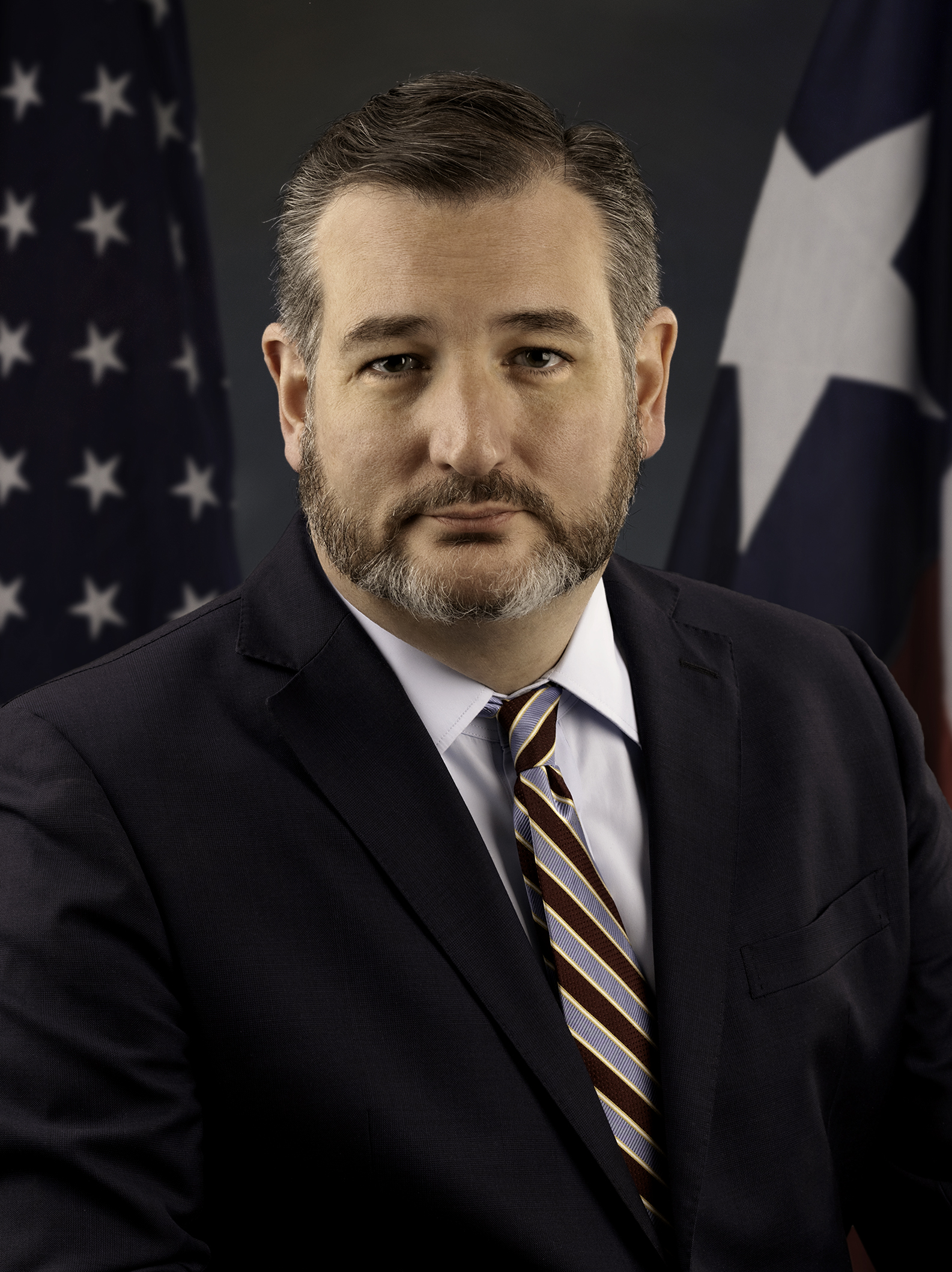
- Official portrait, 2019

Chair of the Senate Commerce Committee
- Incumbent
- Assumed office January 3, 2025
- Preceded by: Maria Cantwell

United States Senator from Texas
- Incumbent
- Assumed office January 3, 2013 Serving with John Cornyn
- Preceded by: Kay Bailey Hutchison
Senate positions
Ranking Member of the Senate Commerce Committee
In office January 3, 2023 – January 3, 2025
Preceded by	Roger Wicker
Succeeded by	Maria Cantwell

3rd Solicitor General of Texas
- In office January 9, 2003 – May 12, 2008
- Appointed by: Greg Abbott
- Preceded by: Julie Parsley
- Succeeded by: James C. Ho

Personal details
- Born: Rafael Edward Cruz; December 22, 1970 (age 55) Calgary, Alberta, Canada
- Citizenship: United States; Canada (until 2014)
- Party: Republican
- Spouse: Heidi Nelson (m. 2001)
- Children: 2
- Parent: Rafael Cruz (father)
- Education: Princeton University (BA); Harvard University (JD)
- Website: Senate website Campaign website
- Ted Cruz's voice Cruz commemorates Juneteenth; Recorded June 18, 2021

Rafael Edward "Ted" Cruz (born December 22, 1970) is an American politician and attorney serving since 2013 as the junior United States senator from Texas. A member of the Republican Party, he served from 2003 to 2008 as the third solicitor general of Texas. He has been described as a movement conservative, a social conservative, and a constitutional conservative with libertarian leanings. Cruz has chaired the Senate Commerce Committee since 2025.

After graduating from Princeton University with a Bachelor of Arts and earning a Juris Doctor from Harvard Law School, Cruz pursued a career in politics, eventually becoming a policy advisor in the George W. Bush administration. In 2003, Texas attorney general Greg Abbott appointed Cruz solicitor general, a position he held until 2008.

First elected to the U.S. Senate in 2012, Cruz is the first Hispanic American to be a U.S. senator from Texas. He played a leading role in the 2013 federal government shutdown, unsuccessfully seeking to force Congress and President Barack Obama to defund the Affordable Care Act. Cruz was reelected in a close race in 2018 and in 2024. In 2025, he drafted and led the effort to pass the TAKE IT DOWN Act, signed into law by President Donald Trump. In May 2025, Cruz introduced a bill to create what later became Trump accounts.

In 2016, Cruz sought the Republican presidential nomination, emerging as a serious competitor to Trump in a primary marked by intense and often personal exchanges. Cruz initially withheld his endorsement after Trump won the nomination, but became a supporter during Trump's first term. Cruz is set to become Texas's senior senator when John Cornyn leaves office in 2027.

== Early life, family, and education ==
Rafael Edward Cruz was born on December 22, 1970, at Foothills Medical Centre in Calgary, Alberta, Canada, to Eleanor Elizabeth (née Darragh) Wilson and Rafael Cruz. Cruz's mother was born in Wilmington, Delaware. She is of three-quarters Irish and one-quarter Italian descent, and earned an undergraduate degree in mathematics from Rice University in the 1950s.

Cruz's father, Rafael, was born and raised in Cuba, the son of a Spaniard—from the Canary Islands—who immigrated to Cuba as a child. As a teenager in the 1950s, Rafael Cruz was beaten by agents of Fulgencio Batista for opposing the Batista regime. He left Cuba in 1957 to attend the University of Texas at Austin and obtained political asylum in the United States after his four-year student visa expired. He earned Canadian citizenship in 1973 and became a naturalized United States citizen in 2005.

At the time of his birth, Ted Cruz's parents had lived in Calgary for three years and were working in the oil business as owners of a seismic-data processing firm for oil drilling. Cruz has said that he is the son of "two mathematicians/computer programmers". In 1974, Cruz's father left the family and moved to Texas. Later that year, Cruz's parents reconciled and relocated the family to Houston. They divorced in 1997. Cruz has two older half-sisters, Miriam Ceferina Cruz and Roxana Lourdes Cruz, from his father's first marriage. Miriam died in 2011 from a drug overdose.

Cruz began using the moniker "Ted" at age 13.

=== Education ===
For junior high school, Cruz went to Awty International School in Houston. Cruz attended two private high schools: Faith West Academy, near Katy, Texas; and Second Baptist High School in Houston, from which he graduated as valedictorian in 1988. During high school, Cruz participated in a Houston-based group known at the time as the Free Market Education Foundation, a program that taught high school students the philosophies of economists such as Milton Friedman and Frédéric Bastiat.

After high school, Cruz studied public policy at Princeton University. While at Princeton, he competed for the American Whig-Cliosophic Society's Debate Panel and won the top speaker award at both the 1992 U.S. National Debating Championship and the 1992 North American Debating Championship. In 1992, he was named U.S. National Speaker of the Year and, with his debate partner David Panton, Team of the Year by the American Parliamentary Debate Association. Cruz and Panton later represented Harvard Law School at the 1995 World Debating Championship, losing in the semifinals to a team from Australia. Princeton's debate team named their annual novice championship after Cruz. At Princeton, Cruz was a member of Colonial Club. His 115-page senior thesis at Princeton investigated the separation of powers; its title, Clipping the Wings of Angels: The History and Theory Behind the Ninth and Tenth Amendments of the United States Constitution, was inspired by a passage attributed to James Madison from the 51st essay of the Federalist Papers: "If angels were to govern men, neither external nor internal controls on government would be necessary." Cruz argued that the drafters of the Constitution intended to protect their constituents' rights, and that the last two items in the Bill of Rights offer an explicit stop against an all-powerful state. Cruz graduated from Princeton in 1992 with a Bachelor of Arts, cum laude.

Cruz then attended Harvard Law School, where he was a John M. Olin Fellow in Law and Economics. He was a primary editor of the Harvard Law Review, an executive editor of the Harvard Journal of Law and Public Policy, and a founding editor of the Harvard Latino Law Review. Referring to Cruz's time as a student at Harvard Law, professor Alan Dershowitz said that Cruz was "off-the-charts brilliant". Cruz graduated from Harvard Law in 1995 with a Juris Doctor degree, magna cum laude.

== Legal career ==
=== Clerkships ===
After law school, Cruz served as a law clerk for Judge J. Michael Luttig of the U.S. Court of Appeals for the Fourth Circuit from 1995 to 1996, and then for Chief Justice William Rehnquist of the U.S. Supreme Court from 1996 to 1997.

=== Private practice ===
After his Supreme Court clerkship, Cruz worked in private practice as an associate at the law firm Cooper, Carvin & Rosenthal (now Cooper & Kirk, PLLC) from 1997 to 1998. At the firm, Cruz worked on matters relating to the National Rifle Association and helped prepare testimony for the impeachment proceedings against President Bill Clinton. In 1998, Cruz was briefly one of the attorneys who represented Representative John Boehner during his litigation against Representative Jim McDermott over the alleged leak of an illegal recording of a phone conversation whose participants included Boehner.

=== Bush administration ===
Cruz joined the George W. Bush presidential campaign in 1999 as a domestic policy adviser, advising then-governor Bush on a wide range of policy and legal matters, including civil justice, criminal justice, constitutional law, immigration, and government reform. During the 2000 Florida presidential recounts, he assisted in assembling the Bush legal team, devising strategy, and drafting pleadings for filing with the Supreme Court of Florida and U.S. Supreme Court in the case Bush v. Gore. Cruz recruited future chief justice John Roberts and noted attorney Mike Carvin to Bush's legal team.

After Bush took office, Cruz served as an associate deputy attorney general in the United States Department of Justice and as the director of policy planning at the Federal Trade Commission.

=== Texas solicitor general ===
In 2003, Texas Attorney General Greg Abbott appointed Cruz to be the solicitor general of Texas. The office was established in 1999 to handle appeals involving the Texas state government, but Abbott hired Cruz with the idea that Cruz would take a "leadership role in the United States in articulating a vision of strict constructionism". As Texas solicitor general, Cruz argued before the U.S. Supreme Court nine times, winning five cases and losing four. He authored 70 U.S. Supreme Court briefs and presented 34 appellate oral arguments. His nine appearances before the Supreme Court are the most by any practicing lawyer in Texas or current member of Congress. Cruz has said, "We ended up year after year arguing some of the biggest cases in the country. There was a degree of serendipity in that, but there was also a concerted effort to seek out and lead conservative fights."

In 2003, while Cruz was Texas solicitor general, the Texas attorney general's office declined to defend Texas's sodomy law in Lawrence v. Texas, in which the U.S. Supreme Court ruled that state laws banning homosexual sex were unconstitutional. In the landmark case District of Columbia v. Heller, Cruz drafted the amicus brief signed by the attorneys general of 31 states arguing that the Washington, D.C. handgun ban should be struck down as infringing upon the Second Amendment right to keep and bear arms. He also presented oral argument for the amici states in the companion case to Heller before the United States Court of Appeals for the District of Columbia Circuit.

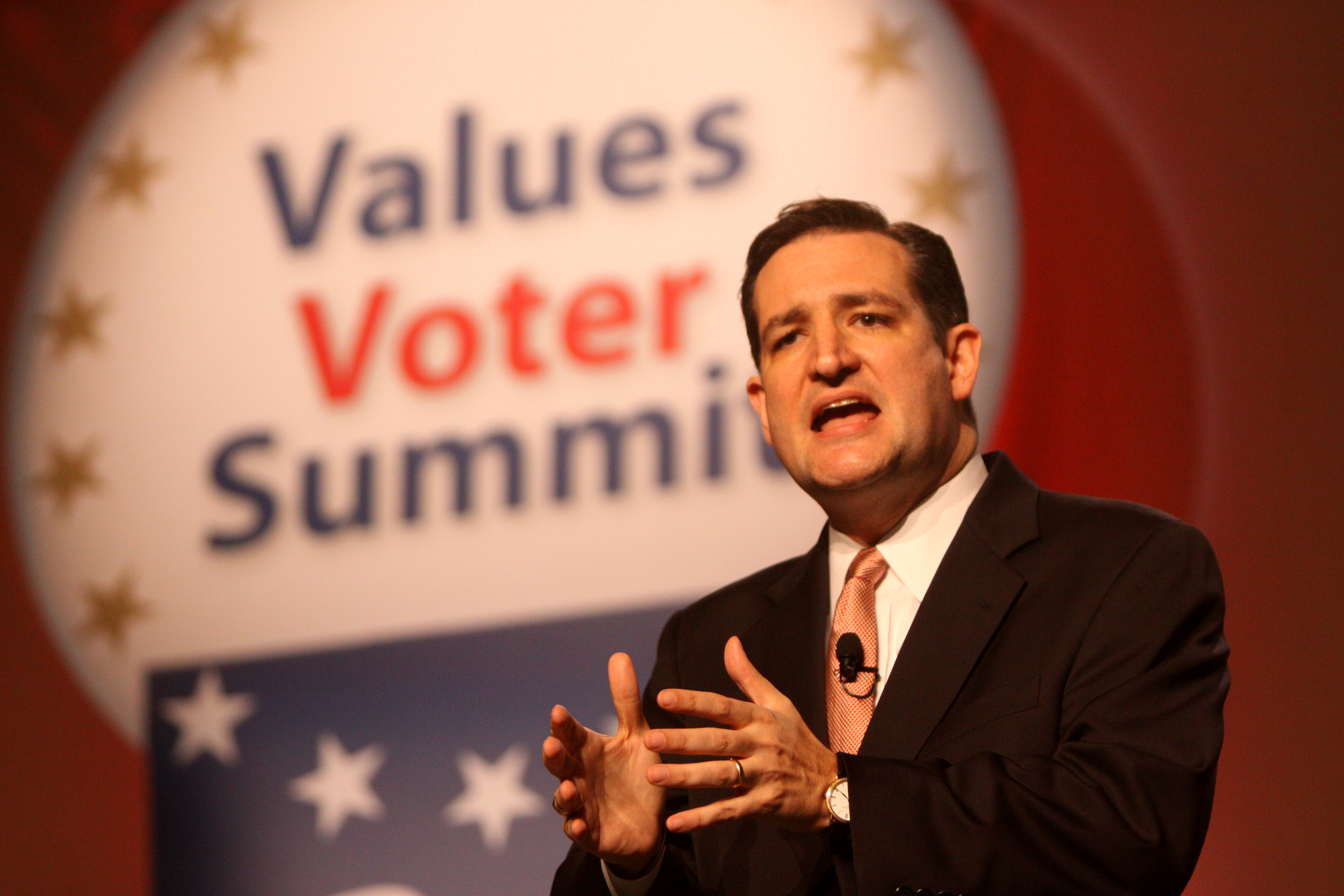
Cruz at the Values Voter Summit in October 2011

Cruz successfully defended the constitutionality of the Ten Commandments monument on the Texas State Capitol grounds before the Fifth Circuit and the U.S. Supreme Court, winning 5–4 in Van Orden v. Perry.

In 2004, Cruz was involved in the high-profile case surrounding a challenge to the constitutionality of public schools' requiring students to recite the Pledge of Allegiance (including the words "under God", legally a part of the pledge since 1954), Elk Grove Unified School District v. Newdow. He wrote a brief on behalf of all 50 states that argued that the plaintiff, a non-custodial parent, did not have standing to file suit on his daughter's behalf. The Supreme Court upheld the position of Cruz's brief.

Cruz served as lead counsel for the state and successfully defended the multiple litigation challenges to the 2003 Texas congressional redistricting plan in state and federal district courts and before the U.S. Supreme Court, which was decided 5–4 in his favor in League of United Latin American Citizens v. Perry.

In Medellín v. Texas, Cruz successfully defended Texas against an attempt to reopen the cases of 51 Mexican nationals, all of whom were convicted of murder in the United States and on death row. With the support of the George W. Bush administration, the petitioners argued that the United States had violated the Vienna Convention on Consular Relations by failing to notify the convicted nationals of their opportunity to receive legal aid from the Mexican consulate. They based their case on a decision of the International Court of Justice in the Avena case, which ruled that by failing to allow access to the Mexican consulate, the United States had breached its obligations under the convention. Texas won the case in a 6–3 decision, the Supreme Court holding that ICJ decisions were not binding in domestic law and that the president had no power to enforce them.

Michael Wayne Haley was arrested for stealing a calculator from Walmart in 1997. Because of Haley's previous criminal convictions, he was sentenced to 16 1/2 years in prison under the Texas habitual offender law. After Haley had exhausted his appeals, it became known that Haley's robbery offense occurred three days before one of his other convictions was finalized; this raised a question about the applicability of the habitual offender statute in his case. As solicitor general, Cruz declined to vacate Haley's sentence, saying, "I think justice is being done because he had a full and fair trial and an opportunity to raise his errors." The Supreme Court later remanded the case to lower courts based on Haley's ineffective assistance of counsel claim. During oral argument, Cruz conceded that Haley had a very strong argument for ineffective assistance of counsel since Haley's attorney failed to recognize the sentencing error and that he would not move to have Haley re-incarcerated during the appeal process. After remand, Haley was re-sentenced to "time served".

In 2008 American Lawyer magazine named Cruz one of the 50 Best Litigators under 45 in America, and The National Law Journal named him one of the 50 Most Influential Minority Lawyers in America. In 2010 Texas Lawyer named him one of the 25 Greatest Texas Lawyers of the Past Quarter Century.

=== Return to private practice ===
After leaving the solicitor general position in 2008, Cruz joined the Houston office of the Philadelphia-based law firm Morgan, Lewis & Bockius, often representing corporate clients. At Morgan Lewis, he led the firm's U.S. Supreme Court and national appellate litigation practice. In 2010, he abandoned a bid for state attorney general when incumbent Attorney General Greg Abbott, who hired Cruz as solicitor general, decided to run for reelection.

At Morgan, Lewis & Bockius, Cruz represented Pfizer in a lawsuit brought by a group of public hospitals and community health centers, who accused Pfizer of overcharging. Linglong Tire was found guilty of marketing versions of tires that were based on blueprints stolen by a former employee of a Florida businessman and ordered to pay $26 million to the Floridian. Cruz worked on the Chinese company's appellant brief. The appeals court denied the appeal and affirmed the jury's award. Cruz represented drug manufacturer B. Braun before the United States Court of Appeals for the Sixth Circuit after the company was found guilty of wrongfully discharging a former employee. Cruz asserted that she had failed to prove that B. Braun had directed her to violate the law and that she had not presented sufficient evidence that her refusal to violate the law was why she had been fired. The appeals court rejected Cruz's argument and affirmed the $880,000 award. Cruz represented Toyota in an appeal to the Texas Supreme Court in a statute of limitations case, where a judge wanted to investigate Toyota for contempt after a former Toyota in-house lawyer accused Toyota of unlawfully withholding documents in a product liability case. Cruz unsuccessfully argued the judge's jurisdiction expired 30 days after the case was dismissed following an out-of-court settlement, but later won a second appeal using the same argument.

Cruz defended two record-setting $54-million personal injury awards in New Mexico at the appellate level, including one that a lower court had thrown out. He represented a mentally disabled man who was allegedly raped by an employee of the facility where he lived, and the family of a 78-year-old resident of an Albuquerque nursing home who died of internal bleeding. The settlements were sealed in both cases.

== U.S. Senate (2013–present) ==
=== Elections ===
==== 2012 ====
Final results by county in 2012: Ted Cruz: >90%; 80–90%; 70–80%; 60–70%; 50–60%; 40–50%; Paul Sadler: 80–90%; 70–80%; 60–70%; 50–60%; 40–50%

Cruz ran as a Tea Party candidate in the 2012 Republican primary, and The Washington Post called his victory "the biggest upset of 2012 ... a true grassroots victory against very long odds".

On January 19, 2011, after U.S. senator Kay Bailey Hutchison said she would not seek reelection, Cruz launched his campaign via a blogger conference call. In the Republican primary, he ran against sitting lieutenant governor David Dewhurst. Cruz was endorsed first by former Alaska governor Sarah Palin and then by the Club for Growth, a fiscally conservative political action committee; the FreedomWorks for America super PAC; nationally syndicated radio host Mark Levin; Tea Party Express; Young Conservatives of Texas; and U.S. senators Tom Coburn, Jim DeMint, Mike Lee, Rand Paul and Pat Toomey. He was also endorsed by former Texas congressman Ron Paul, George P. Bush, and former U.S. senator from Pennsylvania Rick Santorum. Former attorney general Ed Meese served as national chairman of Cruz's campaign.

Cruz won the runoff for the Republican nomination by a 14-point margin over Dewhurst, support for Dewhurst having plummeted while Cruz's vote total dramatically increased from the first round. Cruz won despite being outspent by Dewhurst, who held a statewide elected office, $19 million to $7 million.

In the November 6 general election, Cruz faced Democratic nominee Paul Sadler, an attorney and a former state representative from Henderson, Texas. Cruz won with 4.5 million votes (56.4%) to Sadler's 3.2 million (40.6%). Two minor candidates garnered the remaining 3% of the vote. According to a poll by Cruz's pollster Wilson Perkins Allen Opinion Research, Cruz received 40% of the Hispanic vote, outperforming Republican presidential candidate Mitt Romney among Hispanics in Texas.

After Time magazine reported that Cruz might have violated ethics rules by failing to publicly disclose his financial relationship with Caribbean Equity Partners Investment Holdings during the 2012 campaign, he said his failure to disclose the connection was inadvertent.

In January 2016, The New York Times reported that Cruz and his wife had taken out nearly $1 million in low-interest loans from Goldman Sachs (where she worked) and Citibank, and failed to report them on Federal Election Commission disclosure statements as required by law. Cruz disclosed the loans on his Senate financial disclosure forms in July 2012, but not on the FEC form. There is no indication that Cruz's wife had any role in providing any of the loans, or that the banks did anything wrong. The loans were largely repaid by later campaign fundraising. A spokesperson for Cruz said his failure to report the loans to the FEC was "inadvertent" and that he would file supplementary paperwork. But Cruz intentionally missed the deadline for repayment to challenge the law that only $250,000 in personal loans can be repaid with money raised after an election. In May 2022, the Supreme Court in FEC v. Ted Cruz for Senate sided with Cruz, allowing him to ask donors to help repay $555,000 he loaned to his campaigns: $545,000 he loaned to his 2012 campaign, plus $10,000 he loaned to his 2018 campaign that was over the existing limit of $250,000.

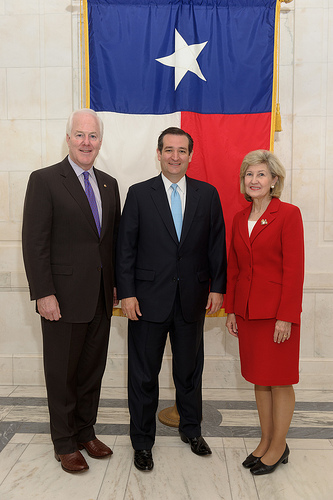
Cruz in 2012 with his predecessor-to-be (Sen. Hutchison at right) and his future fellow senator from Texas (Sen. Cornyn at left)

==== 2018 ====
Final results by county in 2018: Ted Cruz: >90%; 80–90%; 70–80%; 60–70%; 50–60%; Beto O'Rourke: 70–80%; 60–70%; 50–60%; 40–50%

Cruz ran for reelection to a second term in 2018. The primary elections for both parties were held on March 6, 2018, and he easily won the Republican nomination with over 80% of the vote.

Cruz faced the Democratic nominee, U.S. representative Beto O'Rourke, in the general election. The contest was unusually competitive for an election in Texas, with most polls showing Cruz only slightly ahead. The race received significant media attention and became the most expensive U.S. Senate election in history up to that point (until the 2020–21 Georgia special election between incumbent Kelly Loeffler and Raphael Warnock). On November 6, 2018, Cruz defeated O'Rourke by a slim margin, 50.9% to 48.3%.

==== 2024 ====
Final results by county in 2024: Ted Cruz: >90%; 80–90%; 70–80%; 60–70%; 50–60%; Colin Allred: 70–80%; 60–70%; 50–60%; 40–50%

Cruz ran for a third Senate term. On November 5, he defeated Democratic nominee Colin Allred, a former NFL player and U.S. representative, 53.1% to 44.5%.

Cruz outperformed polling and expectations and was reelected by 8.49 points, improving on his 2018 margin by six points and flipping 13 counties. Cruz won a majority of Hispanic and Latino voters, particularly those living on the border with Mexico who had traditionally supported Democratic candidates; the NBC News exit poll showed 52% of Latinos supported Cruz, a 17-point increase from 2018.

=== Legislation ===
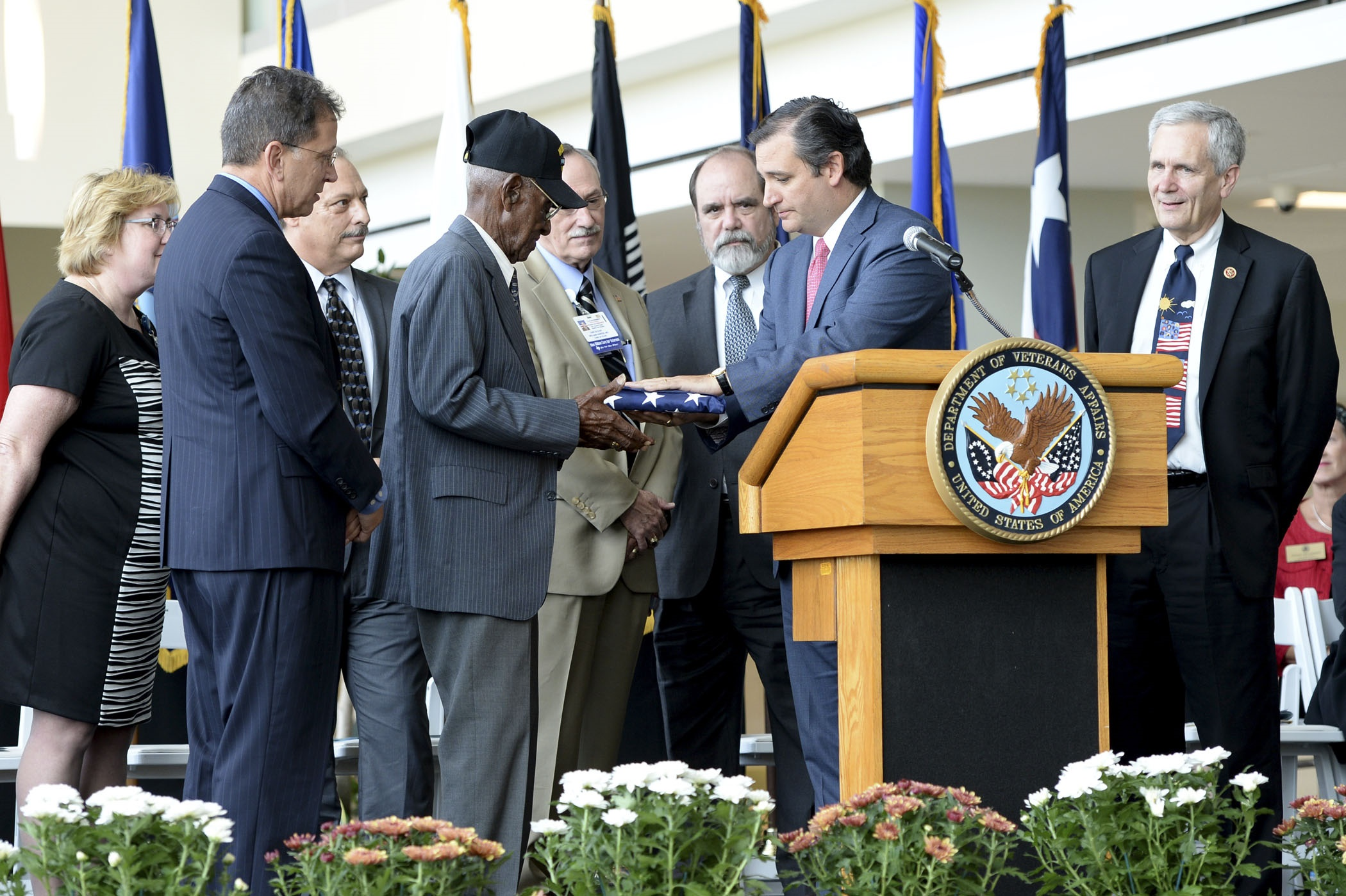
Cruz presents a U.S. flag to World War II veteran Richard Arvin Overton during an opening ceremony for an outpatient clinic in Austin on August 22, 2013.

As of November 2018, Cruz has sponsored 105 bills of his own, including:

- S.177, a bill to repeal the Patient Protection and Affordable Care Act and the health-care related provisions of the Health Care and Education Reconciliation Act of 2010, introduced January 29, 2013
- S.505, a bill to prohibit the use of drones to kill citizens of the United States within the United States, introduced March 7, 2013
- S.729 and S. 730, bills to investigate and prosecute felons and fugitives who illegally purchase firearms, and to prevent criminals from obtaining firearms through straw purchases and trafficking, introduced March 15, 2013
- S.1336, a bill to permit States to require proof of citizenship for registering to vote in federal elections, introduced July 17, 2013
- S.2170, a bill to increase coal, natural gas, and crude oil exports, to approve the construction of the Keystone XL Pipeline, to expand oil drilling offshore, onshore, in the National Petroleum Reserve–Alaska, and in Indian reservations, to give states the sole power of regulating hydraulic fracturing, to repeal the Renewable Fuel Standard, to prohibit the Environmental Protection Agency (EPA) from regulating greenhouse gases, to require the EPA to assess how new regulations will affect employment, and to earmark natural resource revenue to paying off the federal government's debt, introduced March 27, 2014
- S.2415, a bill to amend the Federal Election Campaign Act of 1971 to eliminate all limits on direct campaign contributions to candidates for public office, introduced June 3, 2014

=== Government shutdown of 2013 ===
Cruz had a leading role in the 2013 United States federal government shutdown. He gave a 21-hour Senate speech in an effort to hold up a federal budget bill and thereby defund the Affordable Care Act. Cruz persuaded the House of Representatives and House speaker John Boehner to include an ACA defunding provision in the bill.

In the Senate, majority leader Harry Reid blocked the filibuster attempt because only 18 Republican senators supported it. During the filibuster, Cruz read Green Eggs and Ham by Dr. Seuss. Among supporters, the move "signaled the depth of Cruz's commitment to rein in government" and was extremely popular, with Rick Manning of Americans for Limited Government naming Cruz "2013 Person of the Year" in an op-ed in The Hill, primarily for his filibuster against the Affordable Care Act. Cruz was also named "2013 Man of the Year" by conservative publications TheBlaze, and The American Spectator, "2013 Conservative of the Year" by Townhall, and "2013 Statesman of the Year" by the Republican Party of Sarasota County, Florida. He was a finalist for Time magazine's "Person of the Year" in 2013. To critics, including some Republican colleagues such as Senator Lindsey Graham, the move was ineffective.

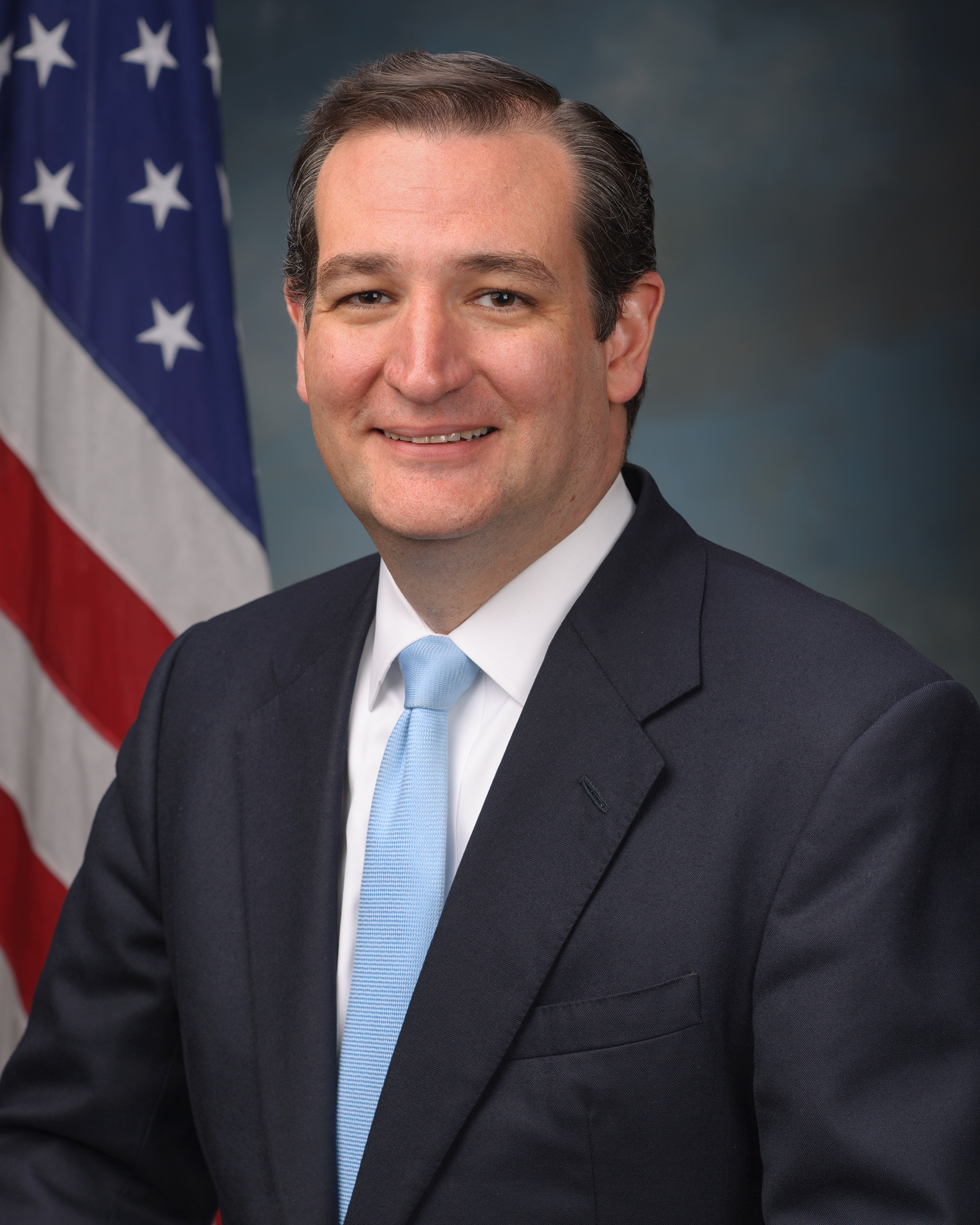
Cruz during the 113th Congress

Cruz has consistently denied any involvement in the 2013 government shutdown, even though he cast several votes to prolong it and was blamed by many in his party for prompting it.

=== S. 2195 ===
On April 1, 2014, Cruz introduced S. 2195, a bill that would allow the president of the United States to deny visas to any ambassador to the United Nations who has been found to have been engaged in espionage or terrorist activity against the United States or its allies and may pose a threat to U.S. national security interests. The bill was written in response to Iran's choice of Hamid Aboutalebi as its ambassador to the UN. Aboutalebi was involved in the Iran hostage crisis, in which of a number of American diplomats from the Embassy of the United States, Tehran were held captive in 1979.

Under the headline "A bipartisan message to Iran", Cruz thanked President Barack Obama for signing S. 2195 into law. The letter, published in the magazine Politico on April 18, 2014, starts with "Thanks to President Obama for joining a unanimous Congress and signing S. 2195 into law". Cruz also thanked senators from both political parties for "swiftly passing this legislation and sending it to the White House".

=== Comments on President Obama ===
In a November 2014 Senate speech, Cruz accused President Obama of being "openly desirous to destroy the Constitution and this Republic". In the same speech, Cruz invoked the speeches of the ancient Roman senator Cicero against Catiline to denounce Obama's planned executive actions on immigration reform. Classics Professor Jesse Weiner, writing in The Atlantic, said that Cruz's analogy was "deeply disquieting" because "In casting Obama in the role of Catiline, Cruz unsubtly suggests that the sitting president was not lawfully elected and is the perpetrator of a violent insurrection to overthrow the government ... In effect, he accuses the president of high treason. Regardless of one's views on immigration reform and the Obama administration at large, this is dangerous rhetoric."

Cruz has repeatedly said that the 2015 international nuclear agreement with Iran "will make the Obama administration the world's leading financier of radical Islamic terrorism". In response, Obama called Cruz's statements an example of "outrageous attacks" from Republican critics that crossed the line of responsible discourse: "We've had a sitting senator, who also happens to be running for President, suggest that I'm the leading state sponsor of terrorism. Maybe this is just an effort to push Mr. Trump out of the headlines, but it's not the kind of leadership that is needed for America right now." Former Republican presidential nominee Mitt Romney also criticized Cruz's remarks, writing that although he, too, opposed the Iran agreement, Cruz's statement connecting Obama to terrorism was "way over the line" and "hurts the cause".

After the death of Associate Justice Antonin Scalia, Cruz said that the winner of the 2016 U.S. presidential election, rather than Obama, should appoint a new Justice. In June 2016, Cruz blamed the Obama administration for the Orlando nightclub shooting, reasoning that it did not track the perpetrator Omar Mateen properly while he was on the terrorist watch-list. Following the terrorist attack on Nice, France, Cruz said in a statement that the country was at risk as a result of the Obama administration having a "willful blindness" to radical Islamists. With the death of Fidel Castro in November, Cruz charged Obama with celebrating and lionizing Castro in public statements he made addressing the death. On December 28, after Secretary of State John Kerry gave a speech defending the U.S.'s decision to allow a U.N. resolution to pass that condemned Israeli settlements "on land meant to be part of a future Palestinian state", Cruz denounced the speech as "disgraceful", and said that history would remember Obama and Kerry as "relentless enemies of Israel". Cruz also accused the Obama administration of having a "radical anti-Israel agenda".

=== Relationship with Donald Trump ===
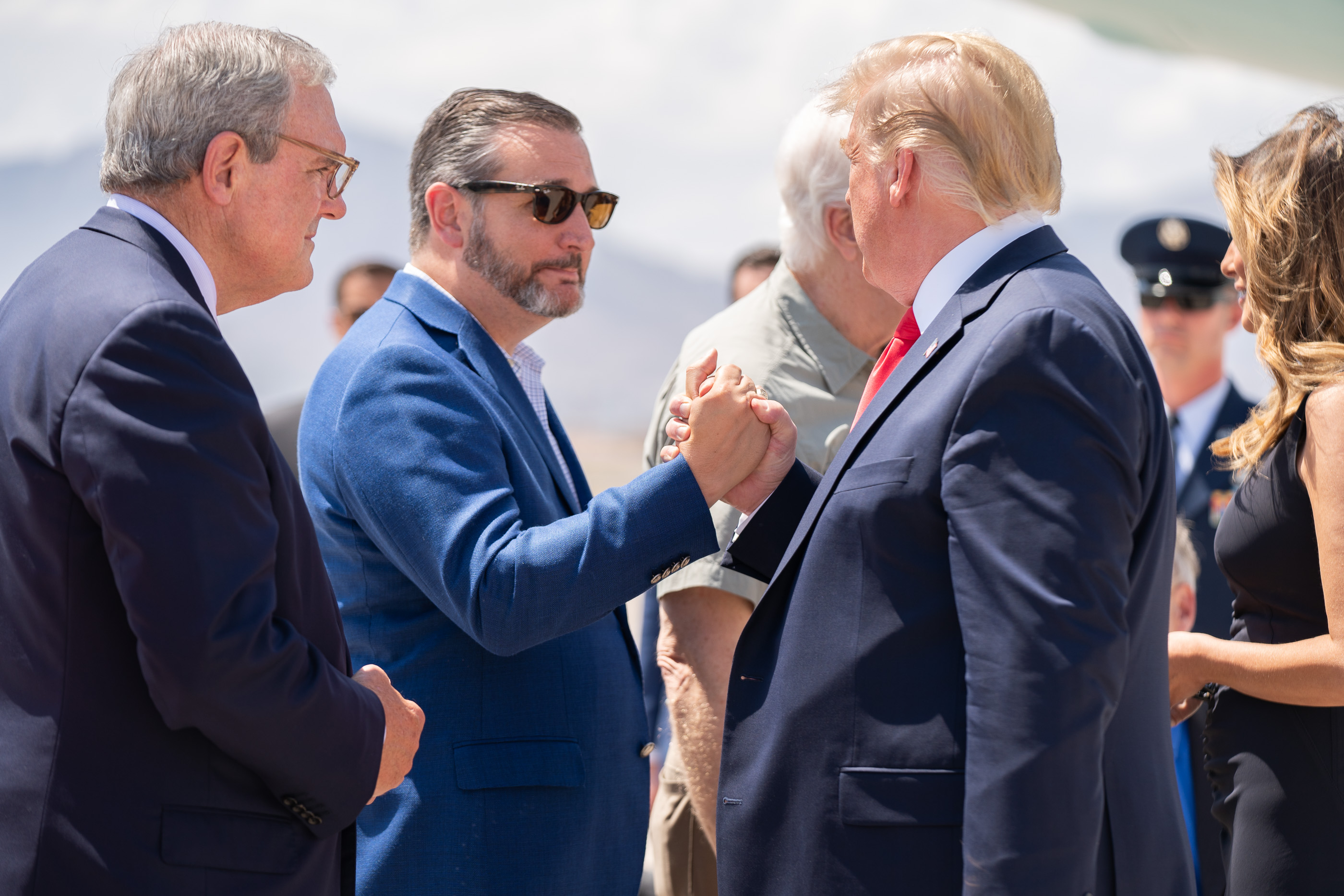
Cruz and President Donald Trump in 2019

Cruz was one of Donald Trump's most vocal critics during the 2016 presidential campaign, with the two often exchanging heated comments directed at each other, and Cruz's family.

After several contentious personal exchanges, on May 3, 2016, Cruz said of Trump:

This man is a pathological liar. He doesn't know the difference between truth and lies. He lies...practically every word that comes out of his mouth. And in a pattern that I think is straight out of a psychology textbook, his response is to accuse everybody else of lying.

But Cruz eventually became an important Trump ally in the Senate. In late January 2017, Cruz praised Supreme Court nominee Neil Gorsuch as "brilliant and immensely talented" in a written statement. On February 23, while speaking at the 2017 CPAC, Cruz showed interest in Trump's nomination of a young justice in the mold of Scalia and Clarence Thomas. On March 1, he called Trump's joint address to Congress the previous day "positive" and "unifying". Cruz said that during his visit to the Mar-a-Lago estate on March 18, he spoke with affiliates of Trump while negotiating the American Health Care Act. On April 6, shortly after the Shayrat missile strike, he released a statement displaying his interest in having Trump appeal to Congress to take "military action in Syria" to prevent Islamic terrorists from acquiring weapons stored in Syria.

In April 2018, in the copy accompanying Trump's entry on the Time 100 most influential people of 2017, Cruz wrote, "President Trump is doing what he was elected to do: disrupt the status quo." Cruz's authorship was criticized by Charles Pierce of Esquire, Jay Willis of GQ, and CNN's Chris Cillizza.

Cruz endorsed Trump for the Republican nomination in the 2024 presidential election.

=== Friction with fellow Republican members of Congress ===
Cruz has used harsh rhetoric against fellow Republican politicians, and his relationships with various Republican members of Congress have been strained. In 2013, he called Republicans he considered insufficiently resistant to Obama's proposals a "surrender caucus". He also called fellow Republicans "squishes" on gun-control issues during a Tea Party rally. Cruz's role in the United States federal government shutdown of 2013 in particular attracted criticism from a number of Republican colleagues. Republican senator John McCain was reported to have particularly disliked Cruz; in a Senate floor speech in 2013, McCain denounced Cruz's reference to Nazis when discussing the Affordable Care Act. In March 2013, McCain also called Cruz and others "wacko birds" whose beliefs are not "reflective of the views of the majority of Republicans". During the 2016 Republican presidential primaries, John Boehner described Cruz as "Lucifer in the flesh"; in an interview, Lindsey Graham said, "If you killed Ted Cruz on the floor of the Senate, and the trial was in the Senate, nobody would convict you."

In a heated Senate floor speech in July 2015, Cruz accused Senate Republican Leader Mitch McConnell of telling "a flat-out lie" over his intentions to reauthorize the Export-Import Bank of the United States, which Cruz opposes. "What we just saw today was an absolute demonstration that not only what he told every Republican senator, but what he told the press over and over and over again was a simple lie", Cruz said. His "incendiary outburst" was "unusual in the cordial atmosphere of the Senate", according to Reuters. In the same speech, Cruz assailed the "Republican majority in both houses of Congresses" for what he called an insufficiently conservative record. His speech, and especially his accusation against McConnell, was condemned by various senior Republican senators, with McCain saying that the speech was "outside the realm of Senate behavior" and "a very wrong thing to do". Orrin Hatch expressed a similar opinion: "I don't condone the use of that kind of language against another senator unless they can show definitive proof that there was a lie ... And I know the leader didn't lie." Cruz alleged that McConnell scheduled a vote on the Ex-Im Bank as part of a deal to persuade Democrats like Maria Cantwell to stop blocking a trade bill; McConnell denied there was any "deal", and that denial was what Cruz called a "lie". Hatch said McConnell did pledge to help Cantwell get a vote on the Ex-Im Bank.

Among Cruz's few close allies in the Senate is Mike Lee of Utah. Cruz has expressed pride in his reputation for having few allies, saying in June 2015 that he has been vilified for fighting "the Washington cartel".

When Boehner resigned from the House in September 2015, Cruz expressed his concern that before resigning Boehner might have "cut a deal with Nancy Pelosi to fund the Obama administration for the rest of its tenure". The next month, the budget agreement passed in the House by a vote of 266 to 187, with unanimous support from Democrats and Boehner, lifting the debt ceiling through March 2017. Cruz called the agreement "complete and utter surrender".

Cruz is one of the Senate Republicans in favor of the "nuclear option", "to speed up consideration of President Trump's nominees". Changing the Senate's rules to a simple majority vote would "ensure a quicker pace on Trump's court picks".

=== U.S. Supreme Court ===
In September 2020, Trump included Cruz on a shortlist, alongside fellow senators Tom Cotton and Josh Hawley, for possible appointment to the Supreme Court. Cruz declined consideration for the position.

=== 2020 presidential election ===
Cruz backed a failed appeal to the U.S. Supreme Court attempting to overturn or nullify the 2020 presidential election in Pennsylvania filed by U.S. representative Mike Kelly, which argued that the Pennsylvania Constitution requires in-person voting except in narrow and defined circumstances; the Supreme Court of Pennsylvania had already rejected this argument. The U.S. Supreme Court declined to take up the case or issue an injunction and Pennsylvania's Electoral College votes were cast for Joe Biden. Cruz later led an effort by a group of Republican senators to refuse to count Pennsylvania's Electoral College votes, citing baseless allegations of fraud. He attacked critics of his attempts to challenge the election results for using "angry language", suggesting that they were increasing tensions amid a volatile situation.

=== Electoral College vote count and storming of the United States Capitol ===
As part of the attempts to overturn the 2020 presidential election that Trump lost, Texas attorney general Ken Paxton filed a suit with the U.S. Supreme Court, seeking to have election results in four states nullified. Cruz, who had previously argued nine cases before the Supreme Court, agreed to Trump's request to argue the Paxton suit should it come before the Court, though it did not. Cruz also garnered the support of ten other senators for a plan by his decades-long friend, Trump attorney John Eastman, to delay the January 6 electoral vote certification for ten days to allow Republican legislatures in six key states Biden had won to consider submitting slates of Trump electors, based on false allegations of widespread voting fraud. Cruz said he was he was "leading the charge" to prevent Biden's certification as president.

On January 6, 2021, during the debate about whether Congress should accept Arizona's electoral votes, Cruz said that 39% of Americans believed the 2020 presidential election was rigged, but that "I am not arguing for setting aside the result of this election". Some observers think Cruz knew claims about fraud in the election were inaccurate and that this speech and his earlier statements were attempts to mislead for political gain. 39% of Americans said they "strongly" or "somewhat agree" that "I am concerned that the election is rigged"; an Ipsos spokesman noted that only 28% agreed the outcome was "the result of illegal voting or election rigging".

Congress's counting of the Electoral College votes was interrupted by an insurrectionist mob that stormed the United States Capitol after a rally near the White House. The attack resulted in the deaths of five people, including a police officer.

When Congress reconvened that evening to continue the count, Cruz voted to object to Arizona's and Pennsylvania's electoral votes. The Senate rejected these objections by 93–6 and 92–7, respectively. The Texas Democratic Party called on Cruz to resign, saying that his efforts to block Biden's lawful victory empowered the Trump supporters who stormed the Capitol. The Texas Democratic Party also called on the U.S. Department of Justice to open an official investigation into Cruz for inciting sedition and treason. The Houston Chronicle called for Cruz to resign. The San Antonio Express-News called for Cruz to be expelled from the Senate. Thousands of lawyers and law students called for him to be disbarred for inciting the insurrection. President-elect Biden and Republican senator Pat Toomey both said Cruz was complicit in the "big lie" of Trump's allegations of voter fraud. Republican operative Chad Sweet, the chair of Cruz's 2016 presidential campaign, denounced Cruz for "assault on our democracy". Several corporations halted donations to Cruz and other Republicans who voted to overturn the election based on Trump's false claims. Lauren Blair Bianchi, Cruz's communications director, resigned.

On May 28, 2021, Cruz voted against creating an independent commission to investigate the riot. On the eve of the anniversary of the attack, he was recorded on video calling it a "violent terrorist attack", which drew sharp criticism from Fox News host Tucker Carlson on his program that night. Cruz appeared on Carlson's program the next night to apologize for that comment as "frankly dumb" and "sloppy". The next day CNN reported that Cruz had characterized the attack as terrorism at least 17 times during the preceding year. Despite his attempts to downplay the incident, Cruz was widely condemned by pro-Trump Republicans—especially Matt Gaetz and Marjorie Taylor Greene—for his comments.

=== Cancún controversy and July 2025 Texas flash floods ===
In February 2021, during a historic winter storm, up to 4.3 million Texas residents were left without power and millions of others without drinking water, including Cruz and his family. In the middle of the storm, Cruz and his family were spotted on a plane heading to Cancún, Mexico, where they planned to stay at the luxury Ritz Carlton hotel and escape their home, which Heidi Cruz called in a text message "FREEZING". Cruz requested that the Houston police escort him and his family through the airport.

Cruz left the family poodle, Snowflake, alone inside the house without heat; reporters saw the dog through the window of the front door of the dark and empty house. Later, a self-identified security guard told a reporter he was caring for the dog.

Cruz's political allies and rivals condemned him for leaving Texas during a crisis and traveling internationally during the COVID-19 pandemic. Cruz initially said he was taking his daughters on a weeklong vacation from school at their request, in an attempt to be a "good dad". Later that day, he returned to Texas, after allowing his family to stay in Mexico, saying that the vacation was a mistake. Protesters calling for his resignation greeted him in front of his house upon his return. After returning from Cancún, Cruz volunteered in Houston to help with recovery efforts.

When the July 2025 Central Texas floods began, Cruz was on vacation in Greece. His office said he returned to Texas "as fast as humanly possible" after the flooding began, but he visited the Parthenon in Athens the day after a flash flood along the Guadalupe River in central Texas killed more than 100 people, including dozens of children and counselors at a camp. Cruz inserted language into the One Big Beautiful Bill Act that eliminated $150 million in funding to "accelerate advances & improvements in research, observation systems, modeling, forecasting, and dissemination of info to the public" about weather forecasting, prompting criticism from environmental groups.

=== Committee assignments ===
In his first two years in the Senate, Cruz attended 17 of 50 public Armed Services Committee hearings, 3 of 25 Commerce Committee hearings, and 4 of the 12 Judiciary Committee hearings, and he missed 21 of 135 roll call votes during the first three months of 2015.

==== Current ====
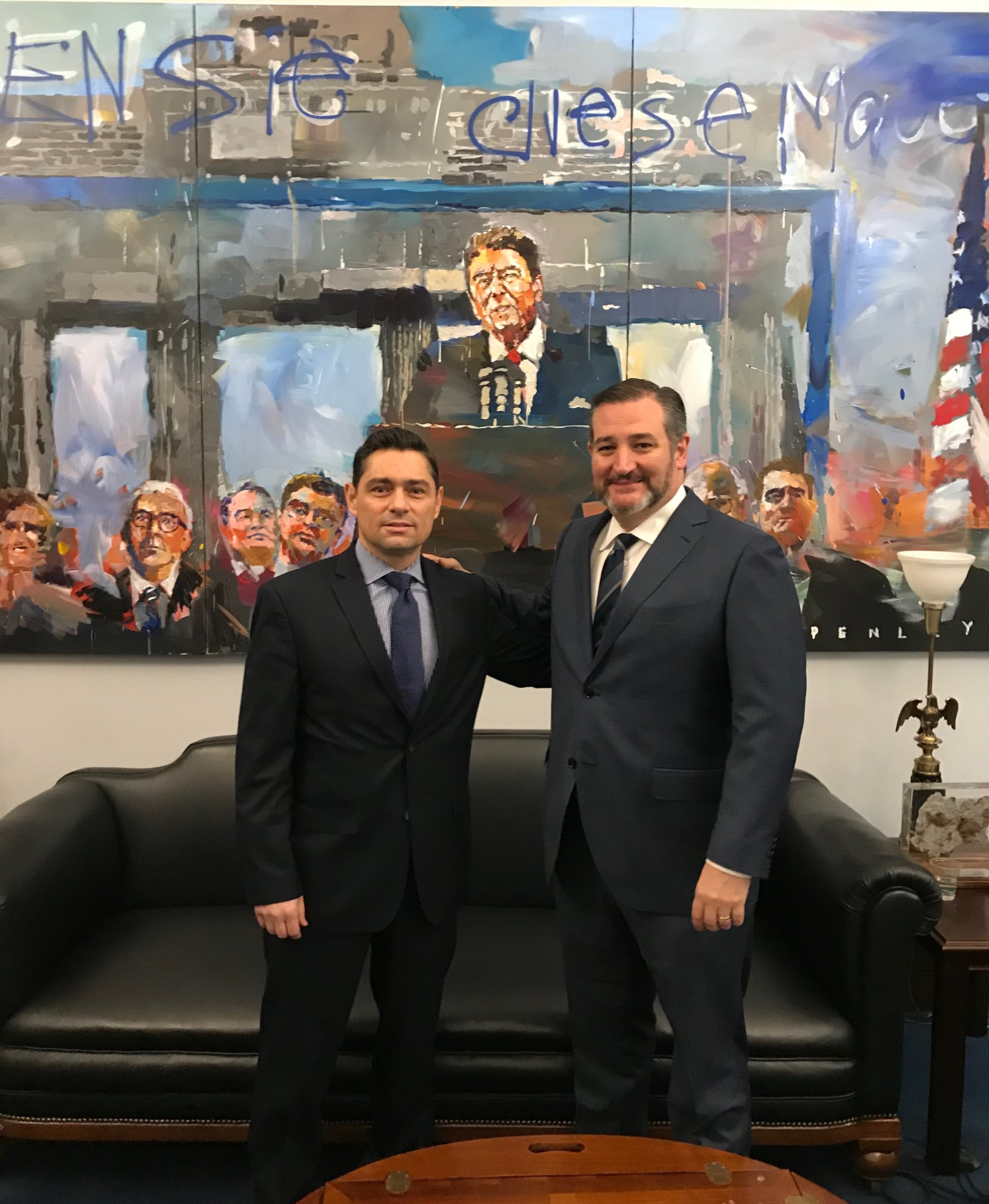
Cruz with Venezuelan Chargé d'Affaires Carlos Vecchio

- Committee on Commerce, Science, and Transportation
  - Subcommittee on Aviation Safety, Operations, and Innovation (Ranking)
  - Subcommittee on Communications, Media, and Broadband
  - Subcommittee on Oceans, Fisheries, Climate Change, and Manufacturing
  - Subcommittee on Space and Science
- Committee on Foreign Relations
  - Subcommittee on East Asia, the Pacific, and International Cybersecurity Policy
  - Subcommittee on Near East, South Asia, Central Asia, and Counterterrorism
  - Subcommittee on State Department and USAID Management, International Operations, and Bilateral International Development
  - Subcommittee on Western Hemisphere, Transnational Crime, Civilian Security, Democracy, Human Rights, and Global Women's Issues
- Committee on Rules and Administration
- Committee on the Judiciary
  - Subcommittee on Criminal Justice and Counterterrorism
  - Subcommittee on Federal Courts, Oversight, Agency Action, and Federal Rights
  - Subcommittee on Immigration, Citizenship, and Border Safety
  - Subcommittee on the Constitution (Ranking)
- Joint Economic Committee

==== Previous ====
- Committee on Armed Services (2013–2019)
- Special Committee on Aging (2013–2015)

== 2016 presidential campaign ==
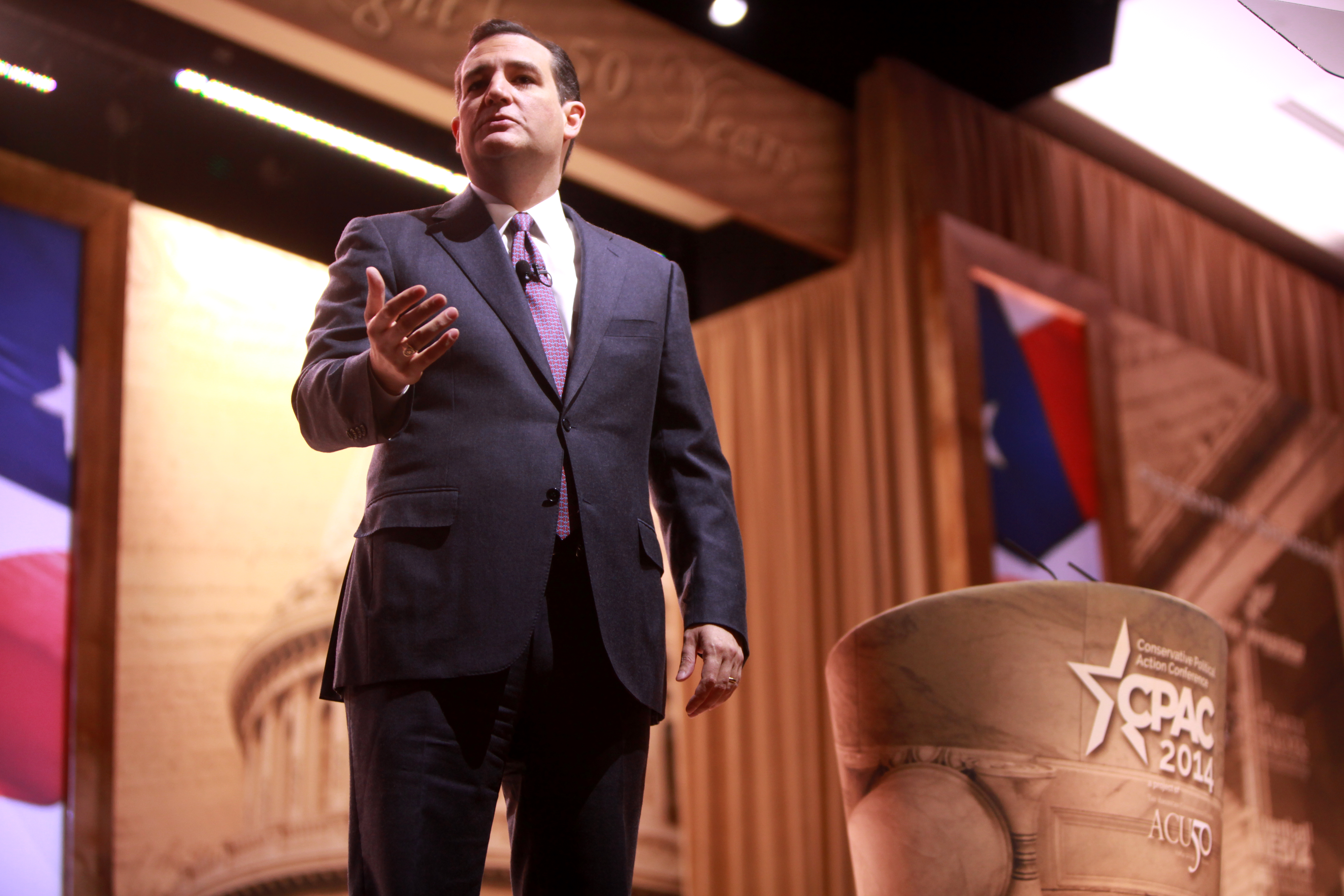
Cruz speaking at the 2014 Conservative Political Action Conference (CPAC) in National Harbor, Maryland

As early as 2013, Cruz was widely expected to run for the presidency in 2016. On March 14, 2013, he gave the keynote speech at the annual Conservative Political Action Conference (CPAC) in Washington DC. He tied for 7th place in the 2013 CPAC straw poll on March 16, winning 4% of the votes cast. In October 2013, Cruz won the Values Voter Summit presidential straw poll with 42% of the vote. Cruz finished first in two presidential straw polls conducted in 2014 with 30.33% of the vote at the Republican Leadership Conference and 43% of the vote at the Republican Party of Texas state convention.

Cruz did speaking events in mid-2013 across Iowa, New Hampshire, and South Carolina, all early primary states, leading to further speculation that he was laying the groundwork for a 2016 bid. Legal analyst Jeffrey Toobin described Cruz as the first potential presidential candidate to emphasize originalism as a major national issue.

On April 12, 2014, Cruz spoke at the Freedom Summit, an event organized by Americans for Prosperity and Citizens United. The event was attended by several potential presidential candidates. In his speech, Cruz mentioned that Latinos, young people and single mothers are the people most affected by the recession, and that the Republican Party should make outreach efforts to these constituents. He also said that the words "growth and opportunity" should be tattooed on the hands of every Republican politician.

Cruz delivered one of many State of the Union responses in January 2015.

On March 23, 2015, Cruz started his 2016 presidential campaign for the Republican primaries and caucuses, in a morning speech delivered at Liberty University in Lynchburg, Virginia. Also, at the same hour, he posted on his Twitter page: "I'm running for President and I hope to earn your support!" He was the first major Republican presidential candidate for the 2016 campaign. During the primary campaign, his base of support was mainly among social conservatives, though he had crossover appeal to other factions within his party, including in particular libertarian conservatives.

HarperCollins published Cruz's book A Time for Truth: Reigniting the Promise of America on June 30, 2015. The book reached the bestseller list of several organizations in its first week of release.

=== Primary wins ===
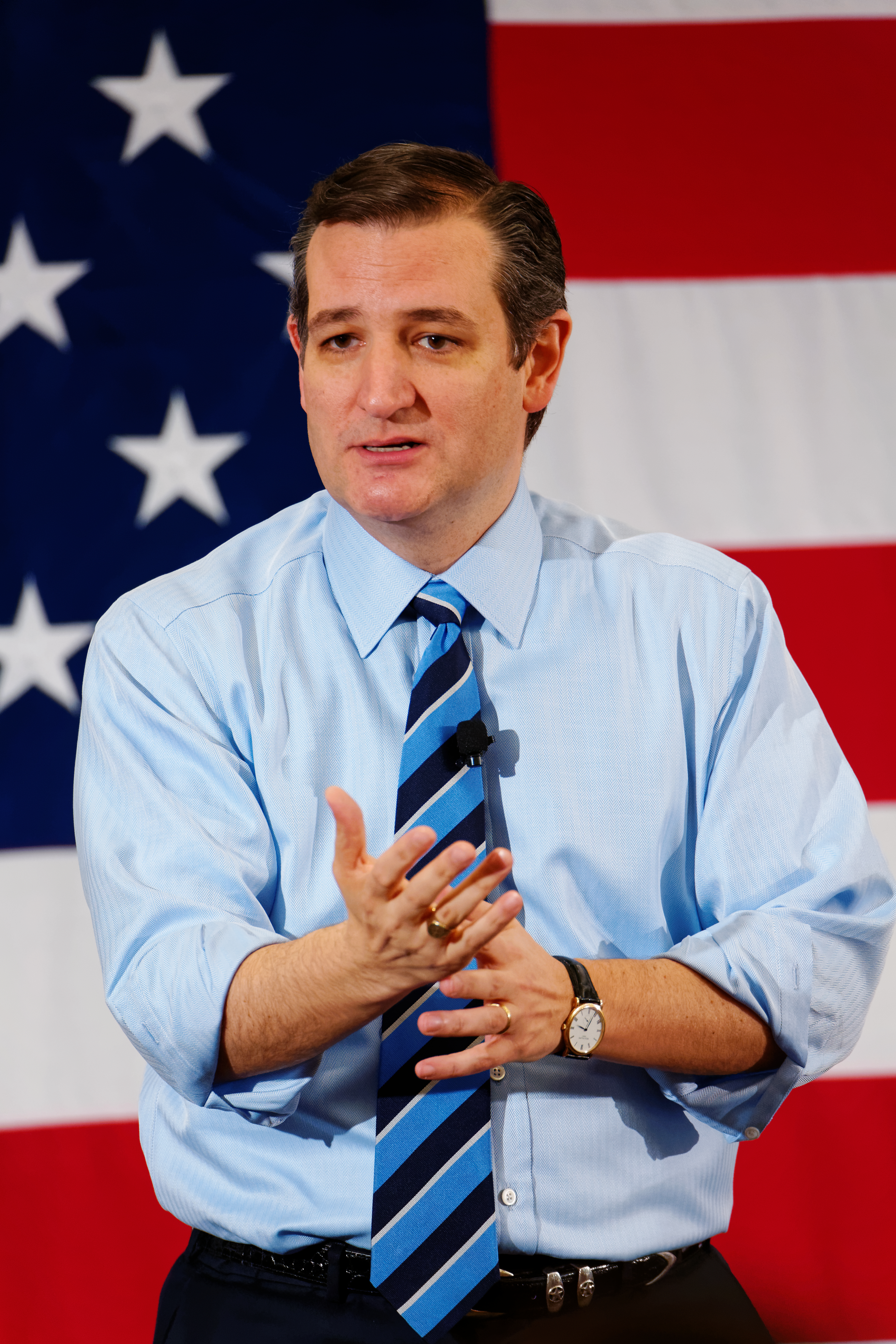
Ted Cruz in Nashua, New Hampshire, on April 17, 2015

In the 2016 Republican presidential primaries, Cruz received over 7.8 million votes, won 12 states, and earned 559 delegates. He raised nearly $92 million, a record for a Republican primary candidate, much of it from small online donors. The Cruz campaign had more than 325,000 volunteers.

On February 1, 2016, Cruz won the Iowa caucuses. The Iowa win made him the first Hispanic to win either a presidential primary election or caucus. He received 28% of the vote. On February 10, Cruz placed third in the New Hampshire primary, with about 12% of the vote. On February 21, he placed third in the South Carolina Republican primary with about 22.3% of the vote.

On March 1, 2016, Super Tuesday, Cruz won Texas by 17%, along with Alaska and Oklahoma, providing him with four state primary victories total. In the Texas primary, he received the most votes in all but six of the state's 254 counties. On March 5, Cruz won the Kansas and Maine caucuses, giving him six statewide wins.

Cruz won his widest margin up to that point in Kansas, where he beat front-runner Donald Trump by 25 points. With his victories over Trump in Texas, Kansas, and Maine, he established himself as the candidate with the best opportunity to defeat Trump, the leading contender for the nomination.

On March 8, 2016, Cruz won the Idaho primary with 45% of vote—defeating Trump by 17% and earning his seventh statewide victory. He placed second in Michigan, Mississippi, and Hawaii. On March 12, Cruz won the Wyoming county conventions with 67% of the vote and 9 delegates, giving him his eighth statewide win. On March 22, Cruz won the Utah Caucus with 69.2% of the vote, versus John Kasich with 16.8% and Trump with 14%. Because he surpassed the 50% winner-take-all threshold, he won all 40 of Utah's delegates. This win was his ninth. On April 3, North Dakota elected a slate of delegates dominated by pro-Cruz delegates. Cruz received the support of the majority of the delegates.

On April 6, 2016, Cruz won the Wisconsin primary with 48.2% of the vote to Trump's 35.1%. It was Cruz's tenth statewide win. He won 36 of the 42 delegates available in Wisconsin. Trump received the other six. On April 2 and 7–9, Cruz swept the Colorado congressional district and state conventions, taking all 34 delegates. This gave Cruz his 11th state win. On April 16, Cruz won all 14 of Wyoming's at-large delegates in the state convention. This secured the majority of state delegates, giving Cruz his 12th state win. On April 27, he said that, if he were selected as the party's nominee, he would choose former CEO of HP and fellow 2016 Republican presidential candidate Carly Fiorina as his vice-presidential running mate. Shortly after losing overwhelmingly to Trump in the Indiana primary on May 3, Cruz suspended his campaign.

=== Citizenship ===
Cruz has said that when he was a child, his mother told him that she would have to formally request Canadian citizenship for him, so he and his family had always assumed he was not a Canadian citizen. In August 2013, after The Dallas Morning News pointed out that he had dual Canadian-American citizenship, he applied to formally renounce his Canadian citizenship and ceased being a citizen of Canada on May 14, 2014.

Several lawsuits and ballot challenges asserting that Cruz was ineligible to become U.S. president were filed at the time. None were successful, and in February 2016, the Illinois Board of Elections ruled in Cruz's favor, stating, "The candidate is a natural born citizen by virtue of being born in Canada to his mother who was a U.S. citizen at the time of his birth."

=== After candidacy ===
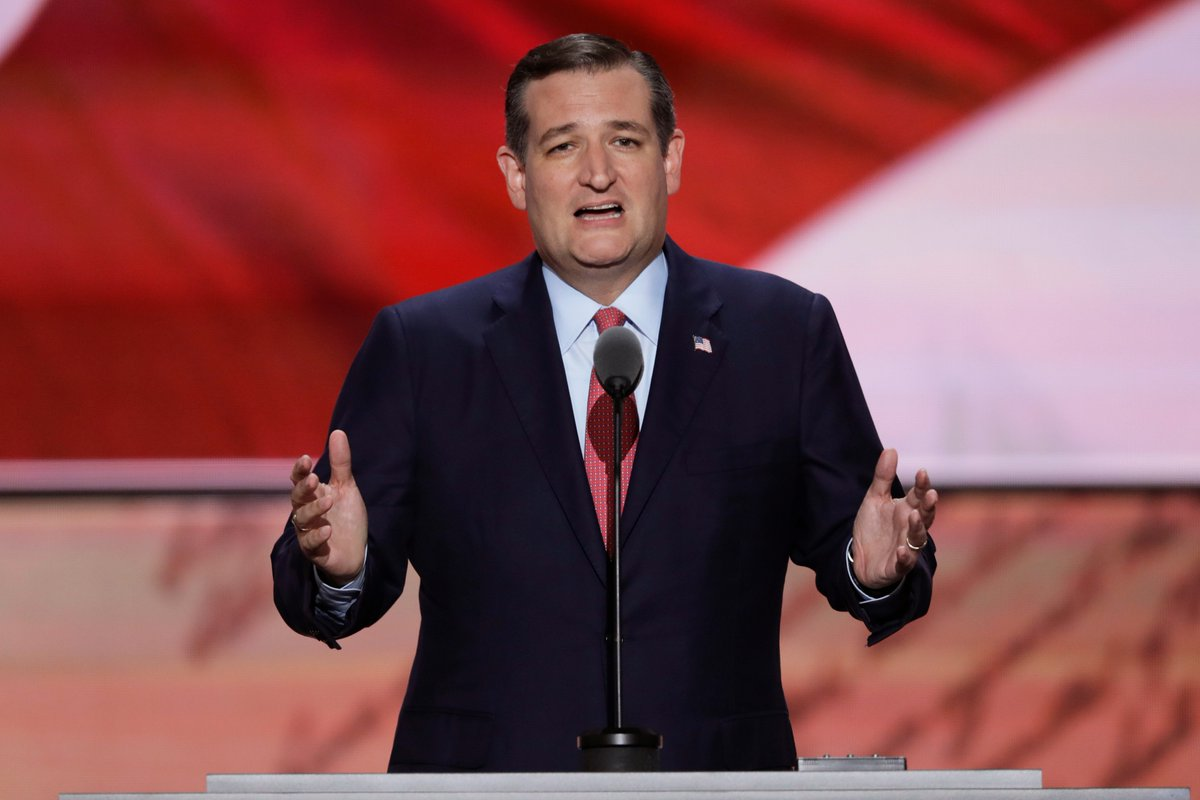
Cruz delivering his speech at the 2016 Republican National Convention, July 20, 2016

Shortly after the campaign's end, Cruz indicated that he would restart the bid if successful in the Nebraska primary, which Trump later won.

In the months following, several publications noted that Cruz still had not endorsed Trump, Cruz explaining in June that he was "watching and assessing" to determine if he would support him in the forthcoming general election. On July 7, after a meeting with Trump, he confirmed that he would speak at the 2016 Republican National Convention.

In his speech on July 20, the third day of the convention, Cruz congratulated Trump but did not endorse him. He instead told listeners to "vote your conscience, vote for candidates up and down the ticket who you trust to defend our freedom and to be faithful to the Constitution". The speech was met with boos and a negative reception among the crowd. The following day at the Texas Republican delegation breakfast, Cruz defended his choice to not endorse Trump: "I am not in the habit of supporting people who attack my wife and attack my father. That pledge was not a blanket commitment that if you go and slander and attack Heidi, that I'm going to nonetheless come like a servile puppy dog and say, 'Thank you very much for maligning my wife and maligning my father.'" On September 23, 2016, he publicly endorsed Trump for president.

On October 10, after the 2005 audio recording of Trump was released and several Republicans retracted their endorsements, Cruz reaffirmed his support, calling Democratic nominee Hillary Clinton "manifestly unfit to be president". On November 15, he met with President-elect Trump at Trump Tower in New York City. It had been reported that Trump was considering Cruz for the position of U.S. attorney general, but the position went to Alabama senator Jeff Sessions. On November 28, in light of Trump showing a softer tone on his campaign promises, Cruz warned that justified backlash could ensue if he strayed from them.

Cruz was backed by the billionaire Mercer family, including Robert and his daughter Rebekah.

=== 2028 presidential race ===
Cruz has made several visits to Iowa in apparent preparation for a 2028 bid for president. When asked about running for president in 2028 during an interview on Texas Lieutenant Governor Dan Patrick's podcast, Cruz said, "It's no secret that I want to be president."

== Political positions ==
Cruz has been characterized as staunchly conservative, radical right, a religious conservative, and anti-establishment.

=== Artificial intelligence ===
In June 2025, on behalf of the tech industry, Cruz introduced an amendment to the One Big Beautiful Bill Act imposing a decade-long moratorium on attempts to regulate AI by the states or the federal government. It was voted down, 99-1.

=== Communism ===
Cruz was a critic of the Cuban thaw, saying on Fox News in December 2014 that the rapprochement was a "manifestation of the failures of the Obama-Clinton-Kerry foreign policy" that "will be remembered as a tragic mistake".

In July 2018, Cruz spoke at the Rally for Religious Freedom in Asia. He said, "It is a pleasure to be here and stand in solidarity for the men and women across this globe who have been persecuted by communists.... We must stand united, in shining light, in highlighting heroism, in highlighting courage, in speaking out for those like my family, like so many millions across the globe who've seen the jackboot of communism firsthand."

=== Crime, guns, and drug policy ===
Cruz has called for an end to "overcriminalization, harsh mandatory minimum sentences, and the demise of jury trials". He supports the death penalty. In his 2012 Senate campaign, Cruz frequently mentioned his role as counsel for the State of Texas in Medellín v. Texas, a 2008 case in which the U.S. Supreme Court held that Texas has the right to ignore an order from the International Court of Justice directing the U.S. to review the convictions and sentences of dozens of Mexican nationals on death row. He has called Medellín the most important case of his tenure as Texas solicitor general.

Cruz is a gun rights supporter, and opposes expanding gun control regulations.

In an interview with radio host Hugh Hewitt discussing the attack that killed three people at a Planned Parenthood clinic in Colorado Springs, Cruz said that "the simple and undeniable fact is the overwhelming majority of violent criminals are Democrats", and claimed that Democrats are "soft on crime" because "convicted felons tend to vote Democratic".

In August 2015, in the wake of the ambush death of a Texas police officer who was gunned down while filling up at a gas station, Cruz said that police are "feeling the assault from the President, from the top on down, as we see—whether it's in Ferguson or Baltimore, the response from senior officials, the President or the Attorney General, is to vilify law enforcement. That's wrong. It's fundamentally wrong. It's endangering all of our safety and security."

Cruz met with gun control advocates Alyssa Milano and Fred Guttenberg to discuss gun violence in the United States. Guttenberg said this was "a really important day".

In May 2022, after the Robb Elementary School shooting, Cruz blamed mass shootings on declining church attendance, violent video games, prescription drugs, cyberbullying, social isolation, and other societal factors. He voted against the Bipartisan Safer Communities Act, a gun reform bill introduced after the Robb Elementary School shooting. The bill enhanced background checks for firearm purchasers under 21, provided funding for school-based mental health services, and partially closed the gun show loophole and boyfriend loophole.

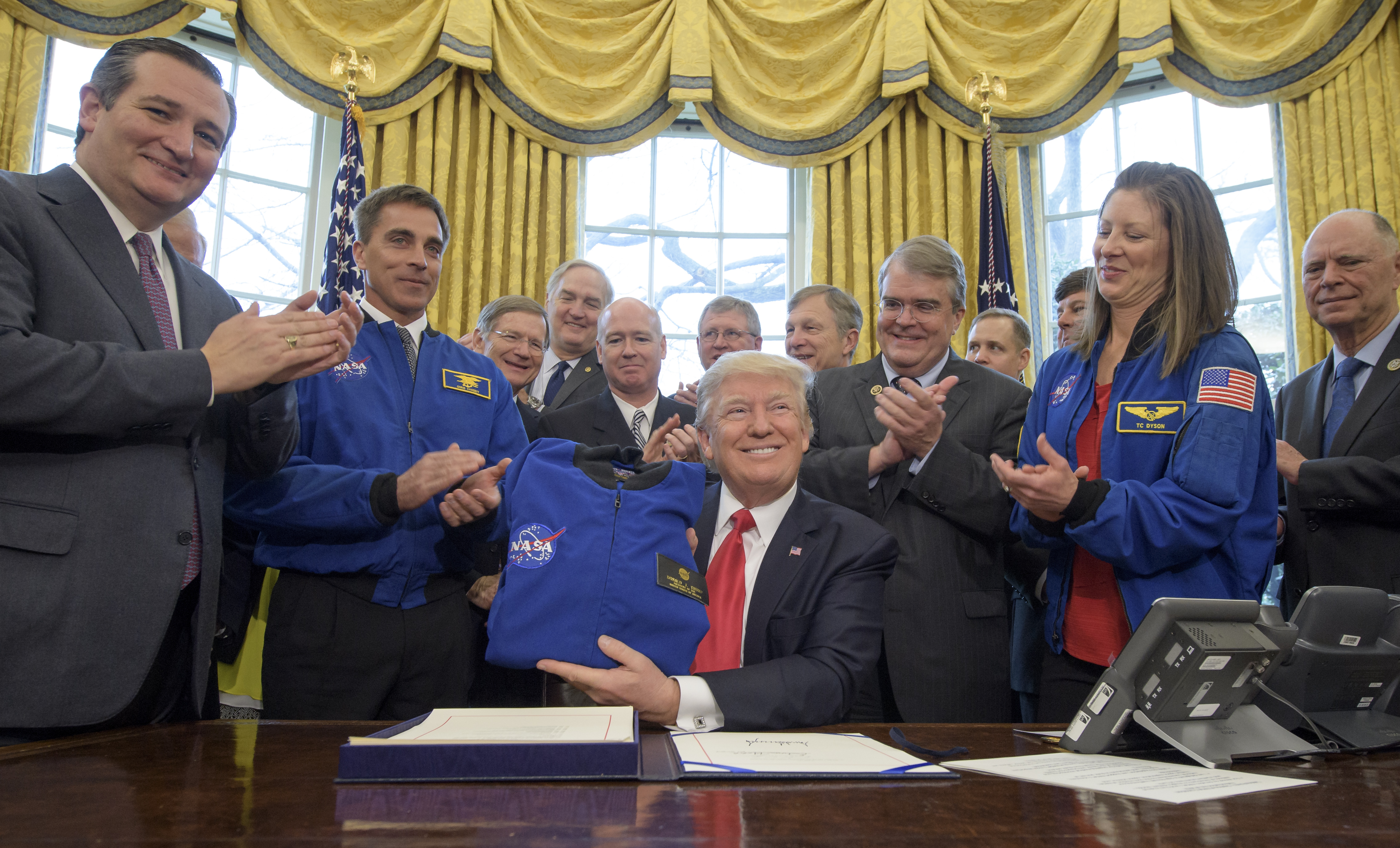
Cruz and President Donald Trump, after signing the NASA Transition Authorization Act of 2017

Cruz opposes legalizing cannabis, but believes it should be decided at the state level. After Colorado legalized cannabis, he said, "If the citizens of Colorado decide they want to go down that road, that's their prerogative. I personally don't agree with it, but that's their right."

=== Economy ===
Cruz has been described by the Cato Institute's Center for Trade Policy Studies as a "free trader" and as a "free-trade advocate" by The Wall Street Journal. In 2013, he proposed the abolition of the IRS and the implementation of a flat tax "where the average American can fill out taxes on a postcard". Cruz is "adamantly opposed to a higher minimum wage".

Cruz wants to decrease the size of the government significantly. In addition to eliminating the IRS as described above, he has promised to eliminate four other cabinet-level agencies: the Department of Energy, Department of Education, Department of Commerce, and Department of Housing and Urban Development.

Cruz voted against the Inflation Reduction Act in 2022.

Cruz was among the 31 Senate Republicans who voted against final passage of the Fiscal Responsibility Act of 2023.

=== Education ===
Cruz is a proponent of school choice and opposes the Common Core State Standards Initiative.

=== Energy and environment ===
Cruz rejects the scientific consensus on climate change. In March 2015, he said that some people are "global warming alarmists" and, citing satellite temperature measurements, said, contrary to NASA's analysis, that there had been no significant warming in 18 years.

Cruz voted against the Water Resources Development Act of 2013 that would have created the National Endowment for the Oceans and authorized more than $26 billion in projects to be built by the Army Corps of Engineers, at least $16 billion of which would have come from federal taxpayers. He voted against the bill because it neglected "to reduce a substantial backlog of projects, to the detriment of projects with national implications, such as the Sabine–Neches Waterway". Cruz said the Corps' responsibilities were expanded without providing adequate measures for state participation. Proponents of the bill argued that it would provide steady funding to support research and restoration projects, funded primarily by dedicating 12.5% of revenues from offshore energy development, including oil, gas, and renewable energy, through offshore lease sales and production based royalty payments, distributed through a competitive grant program.

In 2017, Cruz was one of 22 senators to sign a letter addressed to Trump urging him to withdraw from the Paris Agreement. According to OpenSecrets, Cruz has received more than $2.5 million in campaign contributions from oil, gas and coal interests since 2012. He has a lifetime score of 3% on the National Environmental Scorecard of the League of Conservation Voters.

Cruz is a supporter of TransCanada's Keystone XL Pipeline, and following the Republican senate whip, was a cosponsor of legislation in support of the pipeline.

=== Federal Reserve ===
In a 2014 opinion editorial in USA Today, Cruz wrote that auditing the Federal Reserve System was a top Republican priority in 2015 and that he supported legislation that would allow the Government Accountability Office to evaluate the Federal Reserve's monetary policy. Federal Reserve chairwoman Janet Yellen, whose confirmation Cruz tried to prevent, said in her confirmation hearing that she opposed any audit of the Federal Reserve and "for 50 years Congress has recognized that there should be an exception to GAO ability to audit the Fed to avoid any political interference in monetary policy."

=== Foreign affairs ===
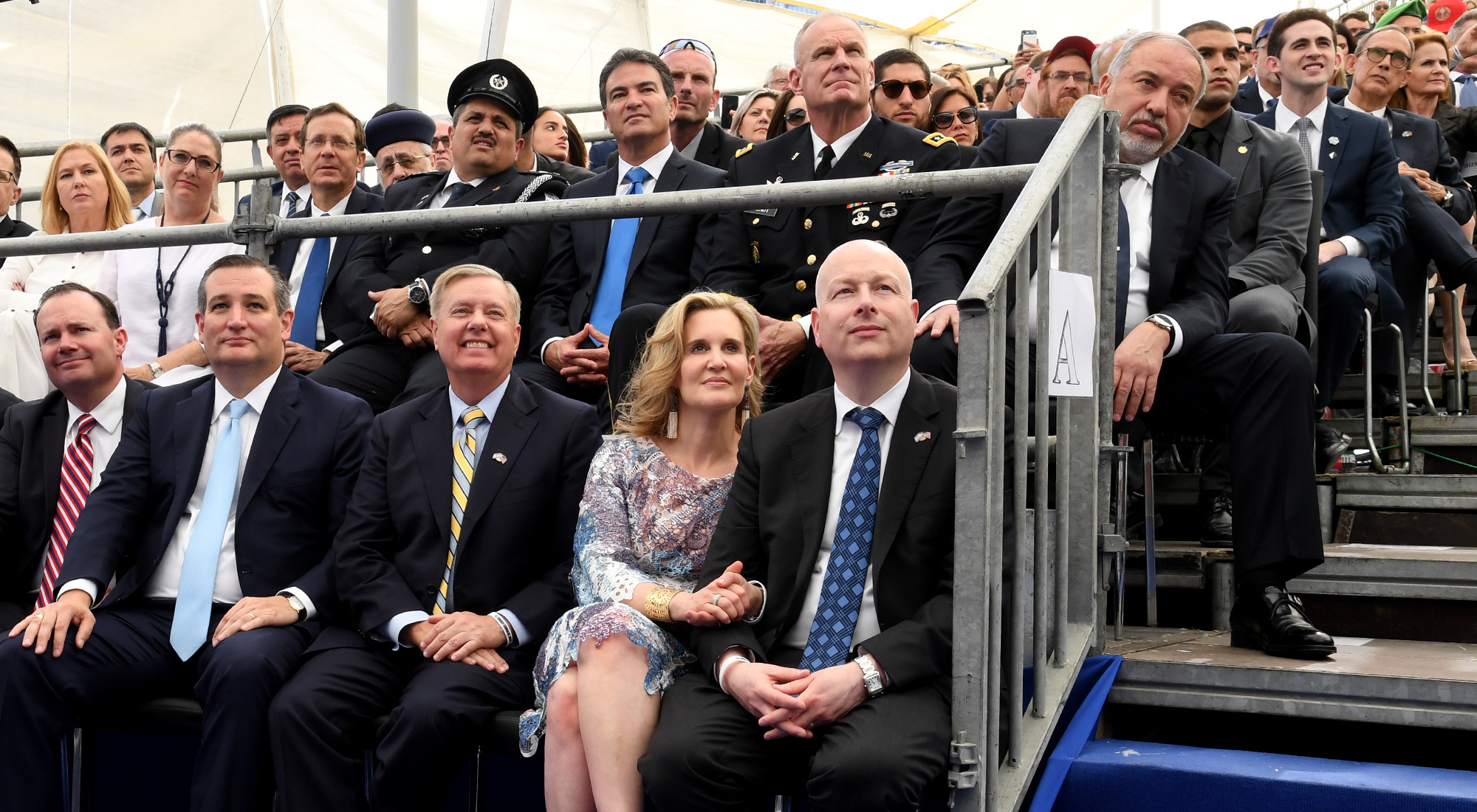
Cruz attended the opening of the US Embassy to Israel in Jerusalem in May 2018.

==== Israel ====
Cruz said in 2025 that he first ran for Senate in 2012 "with the stated intention of being the leading defender of Israel in the United States Senate". He has said that "those who hate Israel hate America", and in reference to Genesis 12:3 said: "Biblically, we are commanded to support Israel". In 2014, he told the Zionist Organization of America, "standing for Israel is a deep passion of mine".

On January 5, 2017, Cruz voted in favor of a House resolution condemning UN Security Council Resolution 2334, which condemned Israeli settlement building in the occupied Palestinian territories as a violation of international law.

In June 2017, Cruz co-sponsored the Israel Anti-Boycott Act (s. 720), which would make it a federal crime for Americans to encourage or participate in boycotts against Israel and Israeli settlements in the West Bank if protesting actions by the Israeli government.

In October 2025, Cruz criticized growing antisemitism on the right and warned of a resurgence of replacement theology underpinning anti-Jewish and anti-Israel sentiment.

==== Iran ====
Cruz has been an adamant opponent of the Joint Comprehensive Plan of Action, a 2015 international nuclear agreement with Iran negotiated by the U.S. and other world powers, calling it "catastrophic" and "disastrous".

In June 2025, during the Iran–Israel war, Cruz told Fox News: "I think it is very much in the interest of America to see regime change", and that there is "no redeeming the Ayatollah". In an interview with Tucker Carlson, he said that Iran had tried to assassinate Donald Trump, and that a Bible phrase saying that those who "bless Israel" will be blessed justifies supporting Israel's attacks on Iran. Cruz was unable to quote the passage or name its location when pressed by Carlson. Carlson criticized Cruz for not knowing the population of Iran, telling him: "You don't know anything about the country whose government you want to overthrow". Cruz initially told Carlson, "We are carrying out military strikes today", before appearing to correct himself: "Israel is leading them, but we're supporting them." He accused Carlson of having a "weird [...] obsession with Israel", which Carlson took as an allegation of antisemitism.

Cruz has called for collapsing the Iranian regime, comparing it to the Cold War-era strategy used against the Soviet Union, and has criticized the Obama-era Iran nuclear deal, pushing for stronger actions against Iran.

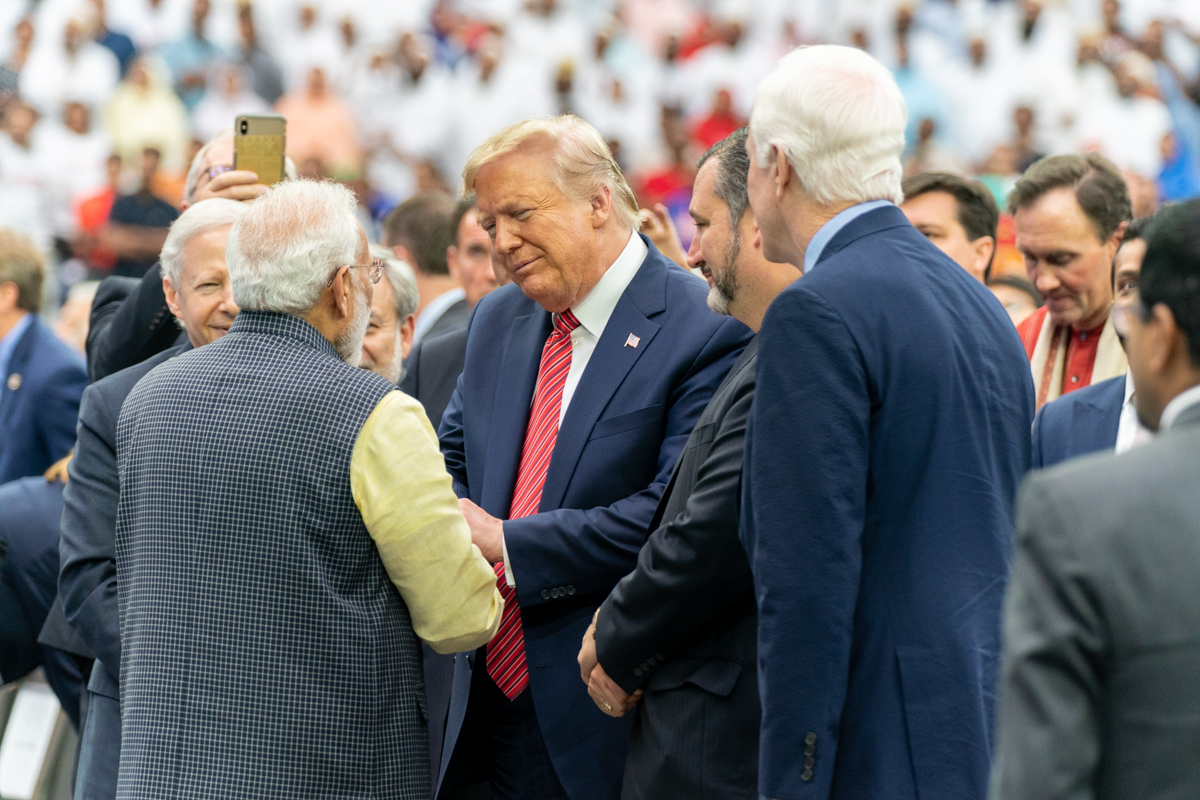
Cruz with President Trump and Indian Prime Minister Narendra Modi in September 2019

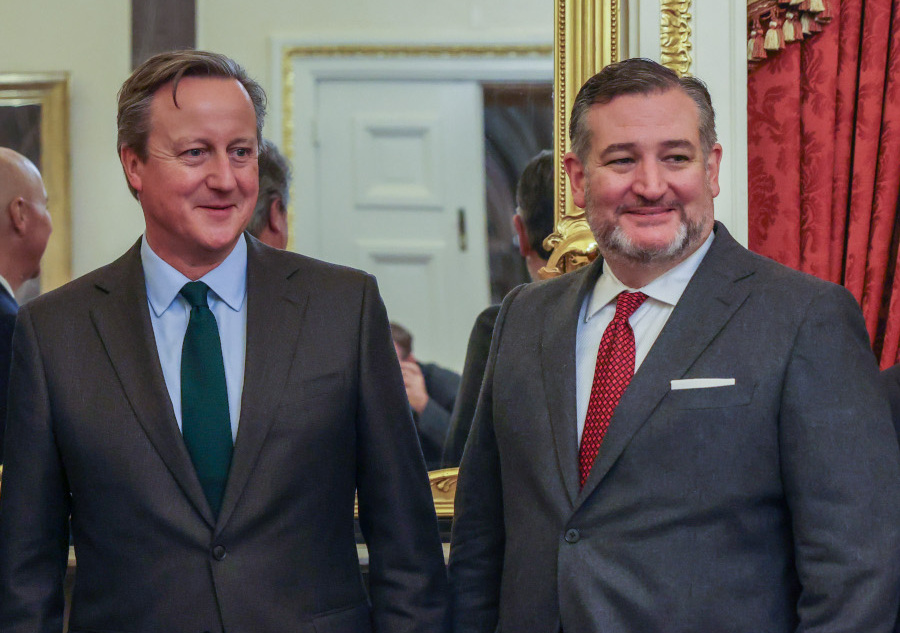
Cruz with British Foreign Secretary David Cameron in December 2023

==== China ====
Cruz has been a consistent critic of China. In early January 2017, Cruz, Texas governor Greg Abbott and some others met with Taiwanese president Tsai Ing-wen. Cruz criticized the People's Republic of China after it reportedly made a statement asking members of Congress not to meet with Tsai.

In August 2018, Cruz and 16 other lawmakers urged the Trump administration to impose sanctions under the Global Magnitsky Act against Chinese officials responsible for human rights abuses against the Uyghur Muslim minority in western China's Xinjiang region. They wrote, "The detention of as many as a million or more Uyghurs and other predominantly Muslim ethnic minorities in 'political reeducation' centers or camps requires a tough, targeted, and global response."

American video game company Activision Blizzard punished a Hong Kong-based professional gamer for supporting pro-democracy Hong Kong protests. Cruz accused Blizzard and Apple of censorship. He co-signed a letter to Activision Blizzard CEO Bobby Kotick that read, "As China amplifies its campaign of intimidation, you and your company must decide whether to look beyond the bottom line and promote American values—like freedom of speech and thought—or to give in to Beijing's demands to preserve market access."

On July 13, 2020, the Chinese government sanctioned Cruz and three other U.S. politicians for "interfering in China's internal affairs" by condemning human rights abuses in Xinjiang. On August 10, 2020, the Chinese government sanctioned Cruz and 10 other Americans for "behaving badly on Hong Kong-related issues".

In 2022, Cruz sharply criticized the Chinese government for its detention of Houston resident Mark Swidan, who had been held for over ten years. The United Nations and U.S. government considered Swidan wrongfully detained. He was released in 2024.

Beginning during his time as a Dublin, California, city councilman, Eric Swalwell was targeted by a Chinese woman believed to be a clandestine officer of China's Ministry of State Security. Swalwell's general relationship with a suspected Chinese agent, Christine Fang, has been characterized as problematic, particularly given his high-profile role as a member of the House Intelligence Committee. Cruz tweeted, "More than once, I've said 'screw the Chinese communists'. Little did I know how closely Swalwell was listening."

==== Other ====
In 2015, Cruz voted for the USA Freedom Act, which reauthorized the USA Patriot Act but reformed some of its provisions.

In September 2016, Cruz backed the Obama administration's plan to sell more than $1.15 billion worth of weapons to Saudi Arabia.

Cruz has called the Nord Stream II natural gas pipeline a threat to the security of Europe and the U.S. In December 2019, he and Senator Ron Johnson wrote a letter to Edward Heerema, the owner of the offshore pipe layer Allseas, to warn him of sanctions if Allseas did not suspend its work on the pipeline, which would deliver natural gas from Russia to Germany. Allseas suspended the work a few days later. In December 2020, the Russian pipelaying ship Akademik Cherskiy continued pipelaying. In January, another pipelayer, Fortuna, joined forces with the Akademik Cherskiy to complete the pipeline. On June 4, 2021, Putin announced that the pipelaying for first line of the Nord Stream II was fully completed. On June 10, the pipeline's sections were connected. The second line was completed in September 2021.

A co-sponsor of the 2019 resolution to commemorate the Armenian genocide, Cruz said that while Turkey is a NATO ally, "We should never be afraid to tell the truth, and alliances grounded in lies are themselves unsustainable."

In October 2021, Cruz posted a tweet criticizing Australia's Northern Territory's vaccine mandates. Chief Minister of the Northern Territory Michael Gunner's response to the tweet went viral quickly, garnering near universal support from Australians.

In March 2023, Cruz voted against repealing the Authorization for Use of Military Force (AUMF) in Iraq.

Cruz appears in the directory of Peter Thiel's organization Dialog.

=== COVID-19 Hate Crimes Act ===
Cruz was one of six Republican senators to vote against expanding the COVID-19 Hate Crimes Act, which would allow the U.S. Justice Department to review hate crimes related to COVID-19 and establish an online database.

=== Health care ===
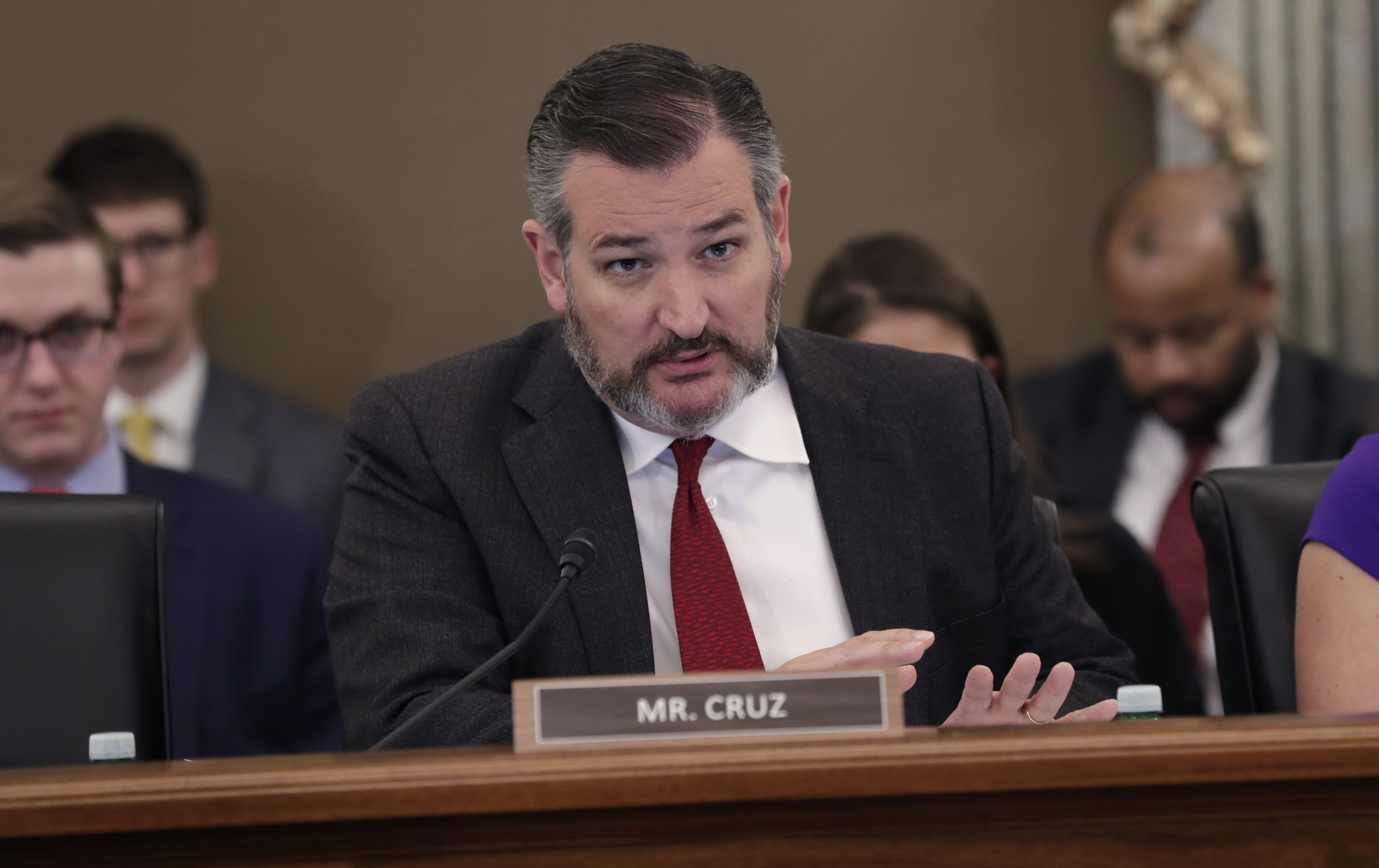
Cruz questions US Customs and Border Protection leaders on COVID-19 preparedness in March 2020.

Cruz was a vocal critic of the Patient Protection and Affordable Care Act passed under President Obama in 2010. During the first year of Trump's presidency, Cruz sponsored legislation to repeal the Health Care and Education Reconciliation Act of 2010, and was part of the group of 13 senators that drafted the unsuccessful 2017 Patient Protection and Affordable Care Act replacement proposals of the AHCA.

=== Hurricane aid ===
In 2013, Cruz voted against a bill to provide a package of federal aid to the Northern East Coast for recovery from Hurricane Sandy because, he said, the bill was "filled with unrelated pork" and "two-thirds of that bill had nothing to do with Sandy". The Washington Post disputed this, writing that "the bill was largely aimed at dealing with Sandy, along with relatively minor items to address other or future disasters." The New York Times wrote that "of 23 examples of extraneous spending that a spokesman for Mr. Cruz provided, all but one—$195 million in discretionary funds for the secretary of health and human services—were Sandy-related or sought to mitigate future storms, as the law required."

In 2015, in the wake of severe flooding in Texas, Cruz supported federal aid funding; and in 2017, called for federal intervention as Hurricane Harvey approached the coast of Texas.

=== Immigration ===
Cruz took a "hard-line stance" on immigration issues during the 2014 border crisis and opposes comprehensive immigration reform. He advocates an increase from 65,000 to 325,000 annually in skilled foreign workers entering the United States using H-1B visas. According to McClatchy, Cruz staked out "hard-right immigration stances" during his 2016 presidential campaign.

Cruz opposes paths to citizenship for undocumented immigrants brought to the United States as children (DREAMers). In February 2018, he was the sole senator to oppose a Republican motion to begin debate on legislation intended to resolve the question of what to do with DREAMers. He has called for the repeal of the clause of the 14th amendment that grants citizenship to those born in the United States, or modification of the policy by statute. He defends the Trump administration's policy of separating migrant children from their parents, blaming the migrant parents for crossing the U.S. border to seek asylum and claiming that the Obama administration had a similar policy.

In December 2020, Cruz blocked the Hong Kong People's Freedom and Choice Act, which would give Hong Kongers refugee status, citing the threat of spying by China. He said the law was an attempt by Democrats "to advance their long-standing goals on changing immigration laws".

During a May 2021 Senate Rules Committee hearing, Cruz falsely asserted that House Democrats had "designed" the For The People Act such that it "directs" people "to break the law and register millions of people to vote who are not eligible to vote because they are not United States citizens" and "automatically registers to vote anyone who interacts with the government" regardless of their immigration status. The bill repeatedly states only U.S. citizens would be permitted to register.

In September 2024, Cruz tweeted an image macro of two cats hugging with captions that reiterated a false claim by Donald Trump that Haitian immigrants steal and eat American citizens' pets. Some Twitter users condemned Cruz for perpetuating a racist hoax, with several citing his Cancún controversy to doubt the authenticity of his concern for the safety of Americans' pets.

=== Judiciary ===
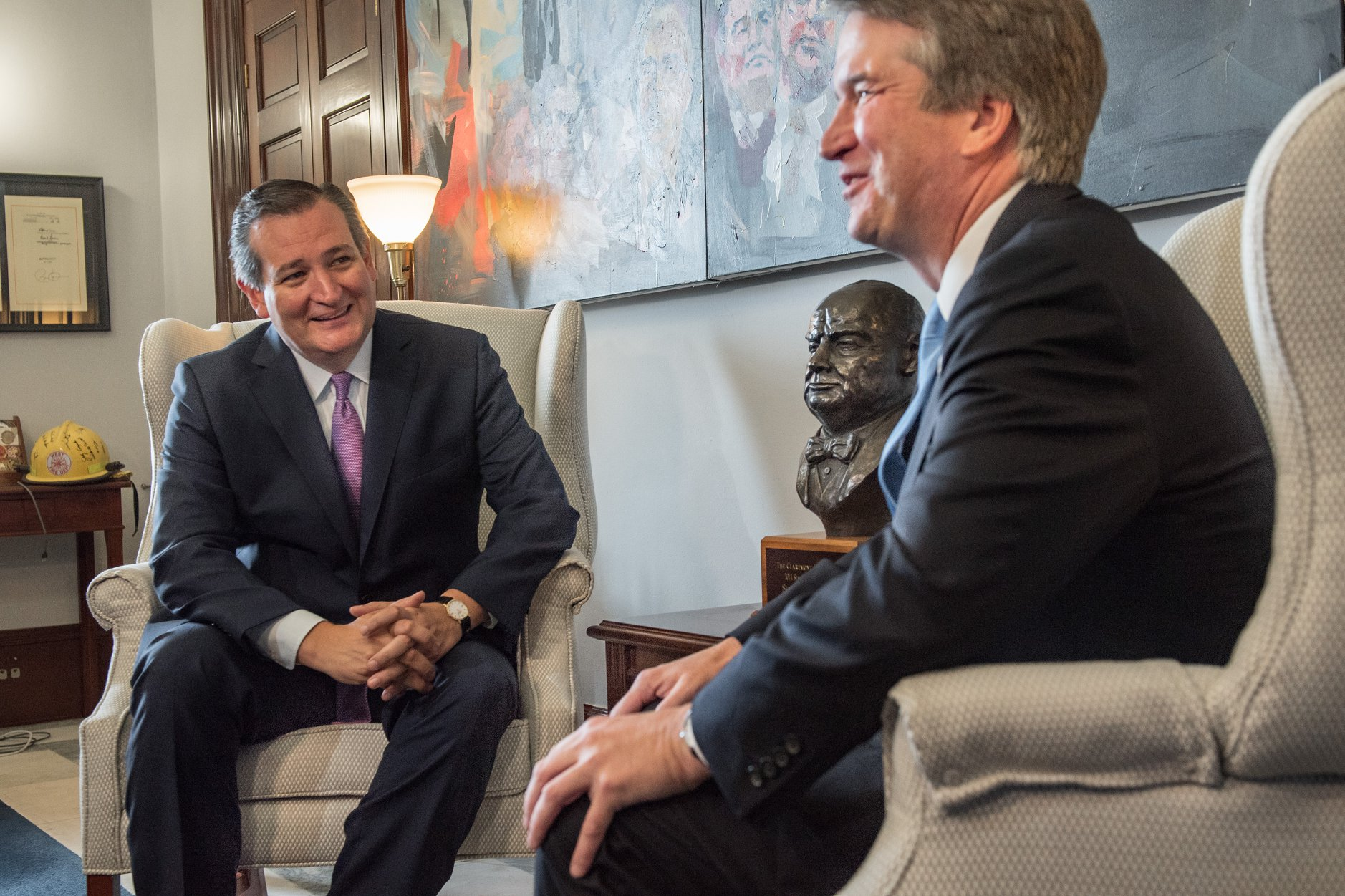
Ted Cruz and Judge Brett Kavanaugh in July 2018

In March 2016, about seven months before the forthcoming presidential election, Cruz argued the Senate should not consider Obama's nominee to the Supreme Court on the grounds that "this should be a decision for the people. Let the election decide. If the Democrats want to replace this nominee, they need to win the election". In September 2020, less than two months before the next presidential election, Cruz supported an immediate vote on Trump's nominee to fill the Supreme Court vacancy caused by Justice Ruth Bader Ginsburg's death.

During Donald Trump's presidency, Cruz and fellow Texas senator John Cornyn contributed to the appointment of multiple conservative judges to federal courts with jurisdiction over Texas.

=== Military ===
Cruz has criticized the U.S. military for becoming "emasculated" by its recruiting efforts, comparing those efforts unfavorably to the Russian military's. He accused Democratic politicians of trying to transform "the greatest military on earth" into "pansies". He has claimed the military is debilitated and its "ability to project power and obtain air superiority is tragically anemic". Blaming "bloated bureaucracy and social experiments", Cruz has proposed reducing the size of the active duty military while increasing spending.

=== Internet and data policies ===
Cruz opposes net neutrality—which prevents Internet service providers from deliberately blocking or slowing particular websites—arguing that the Internet economy has flourished in the United States simply because it has remained largely free from government regulation. He has argued that net neutrality is the "Obamacare for the internet". Cruz said that the Obama-era implementation of the principle of net neutrality had the "end result" of "less broadband, less innovation, and less freedom for the American consumer". In December 2017, after the Republican-controlled Federal Communications Commission repealed net neutrality, he mocked supporters of net neutrality as "snowflakes" who were misled by "online propaganda".

In January 2025, Cruz and senators Chris Murphy, Katie Britt, and Brian Schatz introduced the Kids Off Social Media Act (KOSMA). Senators John Curtis, Peter Welch, John Fetterman, Ted Budd, Mark Warner, and Angus King also co-sponsored the Act, which would set a minimum age of 13 to use social media platforms and prevent social media companies from feeding "algorithmically targeted" content to users under 17. Cruz said: "Every parent I know is concerned about the online threats to kids—from predators to videos promoting self-harm, risky behavior, or low self-esteem. Many families have suffered due to Big Tech's failure to take responsibility for its products. The Kids Off Social Media Act addresses these issues by supporting families in crisis and empowering teachers to better manage their classrooms".

In October 2025, Cruz was the sole senator who objected to the Protecting Americans from Doxing and Political Violence Act, which would extend the data protections afforded to government officials and their families to all Americans.

=== Outsourcing of jobs ===
During his 2016 presidential campaign, Cruz strongly denounced outsourcing American jobs to other countries, alleging that any politician who allowed it to happen was betraying their constituents. He pinned some of his blame on then-President Obama, saying that Obama had overseen outsourcing for the previous seven years. Cruz's denunciation of Obama was criticized by PolitiFact, which found that the modern pattern of American outsourcing, while prevalent during the Obama years, had started earlier. During the campaign, one of Cruz's promises was to return manufacturing jobs to the U.S. His choice of running mate, Carly Fiorina, was met with pushback due to her record of outsourcing, but he defended her. In 2022, Cruz voted against Bernie Sanders's proposed measure for the United States Innovation and Competition Act, which promised to fund semiconductor manufacturers amid a shortage of their products during the COVID-19 pandemic. The measure would block semiconductor manufacturers funded by the bill from outsourcing their jobs and forbid them to dissuade their employees from forming unions.

=== Social issues ===
Cruz is strongly anti-abortion, but "would allow the procedure ... when a pregnancy endangers the mother's life". He is in favor of cutting federal funding to Planned Parenthood. Cruz opposes both same-sex marriage and civil unions.

In 2013, Cruz said he wanted marriage to be legally defined as only "between one man and one woman", but also that the legality of same-sex marriage should be left to each state to decide. In 2015, after the Supreme Court found same-sex marriage bans unconstitutional in Obergefell, he called the decision "the very definition of tyranny", accused the court of judicial activism, and said it was "among the darkest hours of our nation".

In 2017, the same day that an audio clip resurfaced of Alabama Judge Roy Moore calling Obergefell "worse" than the 1857 ruling that upheld slavery, Cruz endorsed Moore for U.S. Senate. He reaffirmed his position in 2022 after comments by Justice Clarence Thomas. While speaking to students at a summit for Turning Point USA, a nonprofit organization that advocates for conservative politics on high school, college, and university campuses, Cruz joked that his favored personal pronoun is "kiss my ass".

In 2022, Cruz voted against the Respect for Marriage Act. In July 2022, he issued a press release saying that he supported the repeal of the 1845 Texas anti-sodomy law, writing, "consenting adults should be able to do what they wish in their private sexual activity, and the government has no business in their bedrooms." Cruz compared the vandalism and destruction of monuments and memorials in the United States to the 2001 destruction of the giant Buddhas of Bamiyan by the Taliban.

== Podcast ==
Cruz and Michael J. Knowles started a podcast, Verdict with Ted Cruz, on January 21, 2020. The first episodes were summaries of the impeachment hearings of Donald Trump. After the hearings ended the podcast expanded its content to include other topics and interviews, including with Washington politicians such as U.S. senators Tim Scott, Lindsey Graham, and Mike Lee, Trump administration officials including White House Chief of Staff Mark Meadows, then–U.S. attorney general Bill Barr, U.S. secretary of education Betsy DeVos, and actors Jon Voight and Isaiah Washington.

In October 2022, Verdict with Ted Cruz picked up corporate partner iHeartRadio. The podcast also expanded to three times a week and Ben Ferguson replaced Knowles as co-host. iHeartMedia introduced the program onto its conservative talk radio stations via its network wing Premiere Networks in 2025, making Cruz the first sitting U.S. senator to host a national radio show. Cruz does not receive payment for hosting the podcast to avoid campaign finance complications.

In August 2026, the Quincy Institute for Responsible Statecraft reported that the Cabinet of Israel was running advertisements on Verdict with Ted Cruz as part of a $7 million "I am Israel" campaign, launched in June 2026, which encourages American Christians to visit the country's biblical sites. The spots are narrated by co-host Ben Ferguson and direct listeners to the "Visit Israel" social media accounts; according to the report, they do not disclose that Visit Israel is run by Israel's tourism ministry. Under the syndication arrangement, iHeartMedia donates revenue associated with the show's ad sales to Truth and Courage PAC, a super PAC supporting Cruz, which the outlet reported had received at least $1.738 million in digital revenue from the company since 2023 according to Federal Election Commission filings. Craig Holman, an ethics lobbyist at Public Citizen, called this a "surreptitious financial arrangement" exploiting loopholes created by Citizens United v. FEC. Watchdog groups had earlier alleged that the arrangement "brazenly violated" the prohibition on corporate contributions; the FEC dismissed that complaint in February 2025, finding "no available information to indicate that Cruz solicited, directed, received, transferred, or spent the funds". Neither Cruz, iHeartMedia, nor the PAC responded to requests for comment.

== Books ==
- Cruz, Ted (2015). A Time for Truth: Reigniting the Promise of America. Broadside Books. ISBN 978-0-06-236561-3.
- Cruz, Ted (2020). One Vote Away: How a Single Supreme Court Seat Can Change History. Regnery. ISBN 978-1-68451-134-1.
- Cruz, Ted (2022). Justice Corrupted: How the Left Weaponized Our Legal System. Regnery. ISBN 978-1-68451-361-1.
- Cruz, Ted (2023). Unwoke: How to Defeat Cultural Marxism in America. Regnery. ISBN 978-1-68451-362-8.
- Cruz, Ted (2026). Going Further: The Incomparable Clarence Thomas. Sentinel. ISBN 979-8-21718-119-3.

== Personal life ==
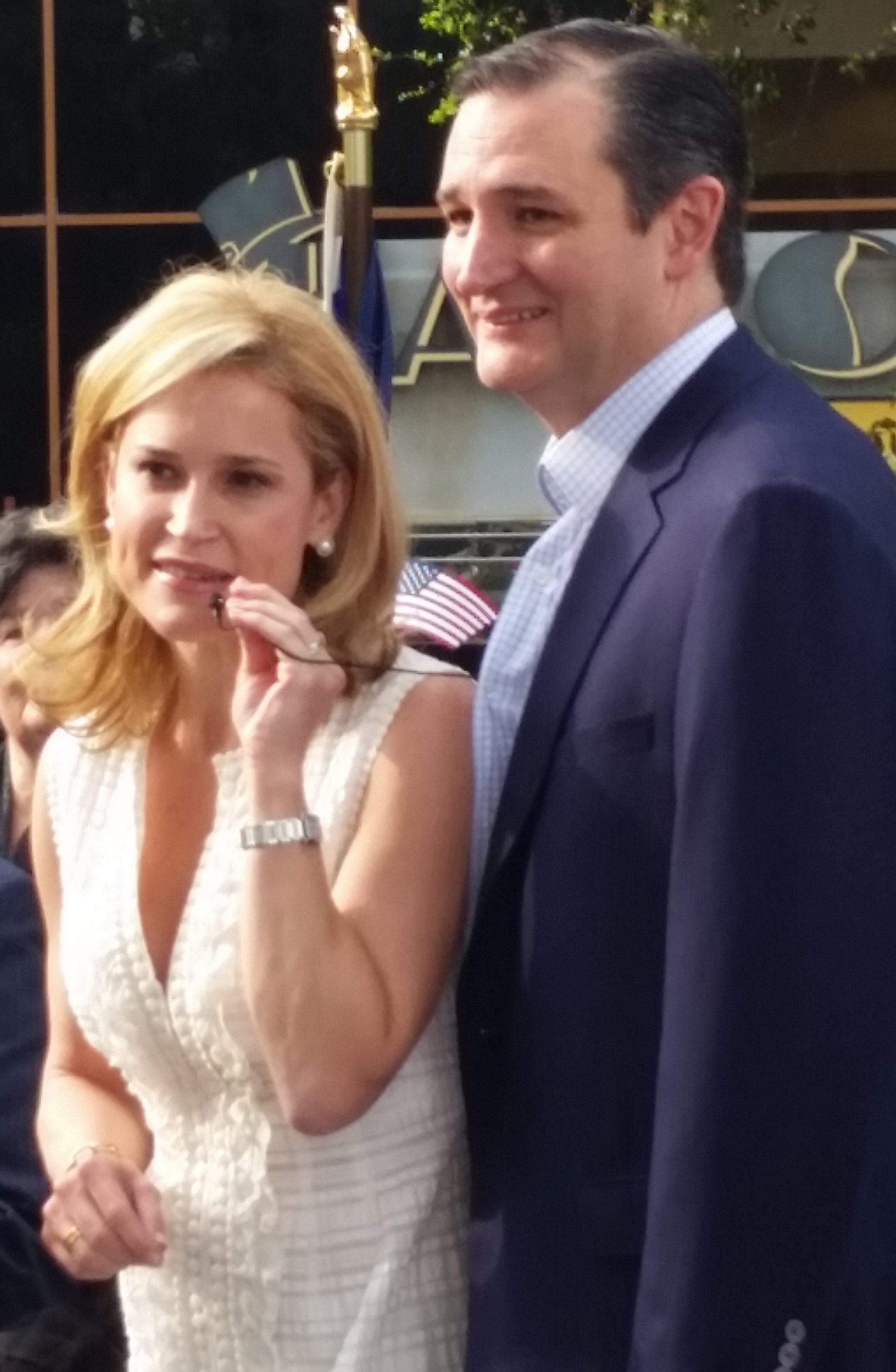
Cruz with his wife, Heidi, at a rally in Houston, March 2015

Cruz married Heidi Nelson on May 27, 2001. The couple met when Cruz was working on George W. Bush's 2000 presidential campaign. Heidi took leave from her position as head of the Southwest Region in the Investment Management Division of Goldman, Sachs & Co. in 2016 to support Cruz's run for president. She previously worked in the White House for Condoleezza Rice and in New York as an investment banker. Cruz lives with his wife and their two children in River Oaks, Houston.

Cruz has joked, "I'm Cuban, Irish, and Italian, and yet somehow I ended up Southern Baptist." He is fond of wearing cowboy boots, but he refrained from doing so when arguing before the Rehnquist court. As of 2018, according to OpenSecrets, Cruz's net worth was more than $3.1 million. In 2023, he cameoed in The Daily Wire comedy film Lady Ballers.

== Electoral history ==
Year	Office	Type	Party	Main opponent	Party	Votes for Cruz				Result	Ref.
Year	Office	Type	Party	Main opponent	Party	Total	%	P.	±%	Result	Ref.
2012	Senator	Primary	Republican	David Dewhurst	Republican	480,558	34.16%	2nd	N/A	Won	
2012	Senator	Runoff	Republican	David Dewhurst	Republican	631,812	56.82%	1st	N/A	Won	
2012	Senator	General	Republican	Paul Sadler	Democratic	4,440,137	56.46%	1st	-5.23%	Won	
2016	President	Primary	Republican	Donald Trump	Republican	7,822,100	25.08%	2nd	N/A	Lost	
2016	President	Convention	Republican	Donald Trump	Republican	551	22.3%	2nd	N/A	Lost	
2018	Senator	Primary	Republican	Mary Miller	Republican	1,322,724	85.36%	1st	+51.2%	Won	
2018	Senator	General	Republican	Beto O'Rourke	Democratic	4,260,373	50.89%	1st	-5.57%	Won	
2024	Senator	Primary	Republican	Holland Gibson	Republican	1,977,961	88.30%	1st	+2.94%	Won	
2024	Senator	General	Republican	Colin Allred	Democratic	5,990,741	53.07%	1st	+2.18%	Won	

== See also ==
- Conspiracy theories related to the Trump–Ukraine scandal
- List of foreign-born United States politicians
- Legal challenges to the Patient Protection and Affordable Care Act
- List of Hispanic and Latino Americans in the United States Congress
- List of law clerks for the chief justice of the United States
- List of United States senators born outside the United States
- List of United States senators from Texas
- Donald Trump Supreme Court candidates
- Ted Cruz–Zodiac Killer meme

Legal offices
Preceded by Julie Parsley	Solicitor General of Texas; 2003–2008	Succeeded by James C. Ho
Party political offices
Preceded by Kay Bailey Hutchison	Republican nominee for U.S. Senator from Texas (Class 1); 2012, 2018, 2024	Most recent
U.S. Senate
Preceded by Kay Bailey Hutchison	U.S. Senator (Class 1) from Texas; 2013–present Served alongside: John Cornyn, James Talarico (elect)	Incumbent
Preceded by Roger Wicker	Ranking Member of the Senate Commerce Committee; 2023–2025	Succeeded by Maria Cantwell
Preceded by Maria Cantwell	Chair of the Senate Commerce Committee; 2025–present	Incumbent
U.S. order of precedence (ceremonial)
Preceded by Angus King	Order of precedence of the United States as United States Senator	Succeeded by Tammy Baldwin
Preceded by Tim Kaine	United States senators by seniority 41st	Succeeded by Elizabeth Warren
