= Heidi Cruz =

American investment manager (born 1972)

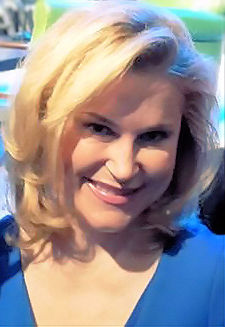
- Cruz in 2016
- Born: Heidi Suzanne Nelson; August 7, 1972 (age 54); San Luis Obispo, California, U.S.
- Education: Claremont McKenna College (BA); Université libre de Bruxelles (MA); Harvard University (MBA)
- Occupations: Banker; financier
- Political party: Republican
- Spouse: Ted Cruz (m. 2001)
- Children: 2

Heidi Suzanne Cruz (née Nelson; born August 7, 1972) is an American businesswoman. She has been a managing director (Note: At Goldman Sachs, a class of employees are promoted to "managing directors" biennially. It is not equivalent to a CEO.) at Goldman Sachs since 2012.

She was an economic policy adviser to George W. Bush's 2000 presidential campaign and subsequently held various positions in the Bush administration, including as an advisor to the Treasury Department and National Security Council. In 2005 she joined Goldman Sachs as a private wealth manager.

In 2001, she married future U.S. Senator Ted Cruz, with whom she has two daughters. In his 2016 presidential campaign, she took a leave of absence to work as his primary fundraiser and surrogate.

== Early life and education ==
Heidi Suzanne Nelson was born on August 7, 1972, in San Luis Obispo, California, to Suzanne Jane (née Rouhe), a dental hygienist, and Peter Christian Nelson, a dentist. Nelson was raised as a Seventh-day Adventist. Her maternal grandfather Olavi Johannes Rouhe was from Savonlinna, Finland. During a part of Nelson's childhood, she lived with her family in Kenya, Nigeria, and throughout Asia, where they served as missionaries, while both parents participated in dental health work.

Nelson attended Valley View Adventist Academy in Arroyo Grande, near her hometown of San Luis Obispo. She completed her secondary education in 1990, at Monterey Bay Academy, an Adventist boarding school about 150 miles north in La Selva Beach, California. Following high school, Nelson attended Claremont McKenna College, graduating Phi Beta Kappa with a BA in Economics and International Relations in 1994. While attending the school, she was active in the student Republican group. While at Claremont McKenna, she studied abroad at the University of Strasbourg. In 1995, she received a Masters of European Business degree from Solvay Brussels School of Economics and Management of the Université libre de Bruxelles in Brussels, Belgium. Her second graduate degree was an MBA from Harvard Business School in 2000.

== Career ==
In 2000, Nelson worked as an economic policy director on the Bush for President campaign, where she met her future husband Ted Cruz. Following her marriage to Ted Cruz in 2001, she went on to work for the Bush administration; she began as a top deputy to U.S. Trade Rep. Robert Zoellick, focusing on economic policy. Cruz worked as director of the Latin America desk at the Department of Treasury in 2002. She taught herself how to speak Spanish between jobs.

In 2003, Cruz reported directly to National Security Advisor Condoleezza Rice. Cruz eventually became the director for the Western Hemisphere on the National Security Council. That year, she delivered the commencement address for the graduating class of Tennessee's Southern Adventist University. After commuting between Washington, D.C., and her husband's home state of Texas for a year, she moved to Texas in 2004, where she briefly worked for Merrill Lynch. She has previously worked for JPMorgan Chase. In 2005, she began working for Goldman Sachs as a private wealth manager.

From 2005 to 2011, she was an active member of the Council on Foreign Relations and was a member of the Independent Task Force on North America that in 2005, published a report entitled "Building a North American Community." Cruz sits on the board of directors for the Greater Houston Partnership. After seven years at Goldman Sachs, Cruz was promoted in 2012, to regional head of the Southwest United States for the Investment Management Division in Houston. In 2019, the Trump administration interviewed Cruz as a finalist for the position of president of the World Bank.

== Role in 2016 presidential campaign ==
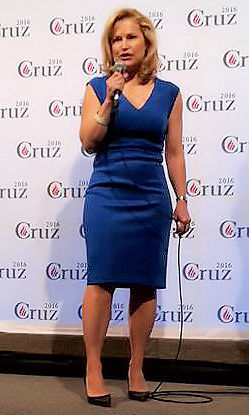
Heidi Cruz speaking at a Ted Cruz for President fundraiser in The Woodlands, Texas, February 2016

Cruz took a leave of absence without pay to participate in her husband's 2016 presidential campaign. During the campaign, she made multiple solo public appearances, speaking on her husband's behalf.

=== Early campaigning ===
Early in her husband's campaign, Cruz's initial role was that of fundraiser, making calls to potential donors, seeking to "max out" investments to the Cruz campaign. Cruz's call list included donor names provided to her by a super PAC.

Beginning in August 2015, Cruz regularly attended presidential debates in which her husband participated. When asked what her role would be as First Lady, she expressed an intent to raise "the standard of living for those at the bottom of the economic ladder in this country", explaining that her interests are on "the economic side". During a two-day trip to Alabama in November 2015, she delivered signatures and payment required for her husband to appear on that state's ballot at the Alabama Republican Party headquarters in Hoover.

On December 3, Cruz returned to Texas to file paperwork for her husband's name to appear on the state ballot. She acknowledged she had previously filed for his name on ballots in previous states, but also said the Cruz campaign had "a campaign strategy that's built to last, and we have built a grass-roots army that this country hasn't seen since Ronald Reagan."

=== Primaries ===
Cruz stumped for her husband in Iowa ahead of the 2016 Republican caucuses, appearing in the state multiple times. Ted Cruz ultimately won the state, which she believed was due to "one strong voice of the people coming together". For New Hampshire, another early primary state, it was reported in January that she would make stops there to rally support for her husband. In February, Cruz was reported to be headlining a luncheon for Republican women in Reno, Nevada, days before the state's primary.

Cruz's campaigning in Texas was viewed by commentators (including potential voters) as essential to her husband's winning of his home state on Super Tuesday. At the time of her campaigning in Texas, Ted Cruz was expected to win the state, the move being seen as the Cruz campaign not wanting to take any chances. According to Cruz, both she and her husband were confident about his prospects of winning. She emphasized the state as both her and her husband's home state. After Super Tuesday, Cruz herself subsequently campaigned independently in North Carolina, Illinois, and Missouri. She then substituted for her husband in Fayetteville, North Carolina, speaking at Fayetteville Technical Community College in promotion of him, and jointly appeared with her husband in Wisconsin. Weeks before the state primaries, Cruz appeared in Indiana. Ted Cruz dropped out of the primary after a loss in Indiana to Donald Trump on May 3, 2016. Prior to dropping out, Cruz was involved in a Twitter feud with Donald Trump after Trump retweeted a composite image of an unflattering photo of Heidi next to a photo of Melania Trump, captioning it with "No need to ‘spill the beans.’ The images are worth a thousand words.”

== Personal life ==
Cruz and her husband have two daughters, Caroline and Catherine. Since 2011, she characterizes herself as the primary breadwinner of the family. Cruz converted to the Southern Baptist denomination, though she still maintains a vegetarian diet in adherence with her Adventist upbringing.
