= Ted Cruz 2016 presidential campaign =

Ted Cruz for President
- Campaign: 2016 Republican Party presidential primaries
- Candidate: Ted Cruz; U.S. Senator from Texas (2013–present); Carly Fiorina; CEO of Hewlett-Packard (1999–2005)
- Affiliation: Republican Party
- Announced: March 23, 2015
- Suspended: May 3, 2016
- Headquarters: Houston, Texas, U.S.
- Key people: Jeff Roe, campaign manager Jason Johnson, chief strategist Victoria Coates, foreign policy adviser Frank Gaffney, foreign policy adviser William G. Boykin, foreign policy adviser Elliott Abrams, foreign policy adviser Clare M. Lopez, foreign policy adviser Andrew C. McCarthy, foreign policy adviser Jim Talent, foreign policy adviser Fred Fleitz, foreign policy adviser
- Receipts: US$92,137,208 (2-29-2016)
- Slogan(s): Together, we will win Courageous Conservatives; Reigniting the Promise of America; TRUS(TED); A Time for Truth; Defeat the Washington Cartel

Website
- Cruz for President (archived - July 8, 2015)

The 2016 presidential campaign of Ted Cruz, the junior United States senator from Texas, was announced on March 23, 2015. He was a candidate for the Republican Party's 2016 presidential nomination and won the second-most state contests and delegates. Cruz themed his campaign around being an outsider and a strict conservative. In the crowded early field, he chose not to directly confront the leading candidate, Donald Trump, who was also viewed as an outsider candidate. His cordial and sympathetic tone towards Trump contrasted with the more critical approach of rivals such as Jeb Bush, John Kasich, Marco Rubio, and Rand Paul.

As the field narrowed, Cruz's position in the race strengthened, owing to his debate performances and strong field infrastructure. He won the Iowa Caucuses in February, the first contest of the race. But as the field narrowed and less-viable candidates dropped out, Republican support concentrated around Trump rather than Cruz. Trump beat Cruz handily on Super Tuesday and in most subsequent primaries. At this point, with the race essentially narrowed to one between Cruz and Trump, the two candidates began to openly criticize each other (whereas they had previously been notably cordial). Trump repeatedly called Cruz "Lyin' Ted" and on one occasion retweeted a deprecating tweet regarding the physical appearance of Cruz's wife. Trump also parroted a false story in the National Enquirer claiming that Cruz's father, Rafael Cruz, was involved in the Assassination of President John F. Kennedy. Cruz called Trump a chronic liar, "completely amoral", and questioned whether he was a genuine conservative.

In late April, while trailing Trump heavily in the delegate count, Cruz announced that his vice presidential running mate would be former-candidate Carly Fiorina. A week later, he lost the Indiana primary, which he had called pivotal to stopping Trump from clinching the nomination. Having become mathematically disqualified from achieving a majority of delegates prior to the first convention vote, he suspended his campaign the same night.

== Background ==
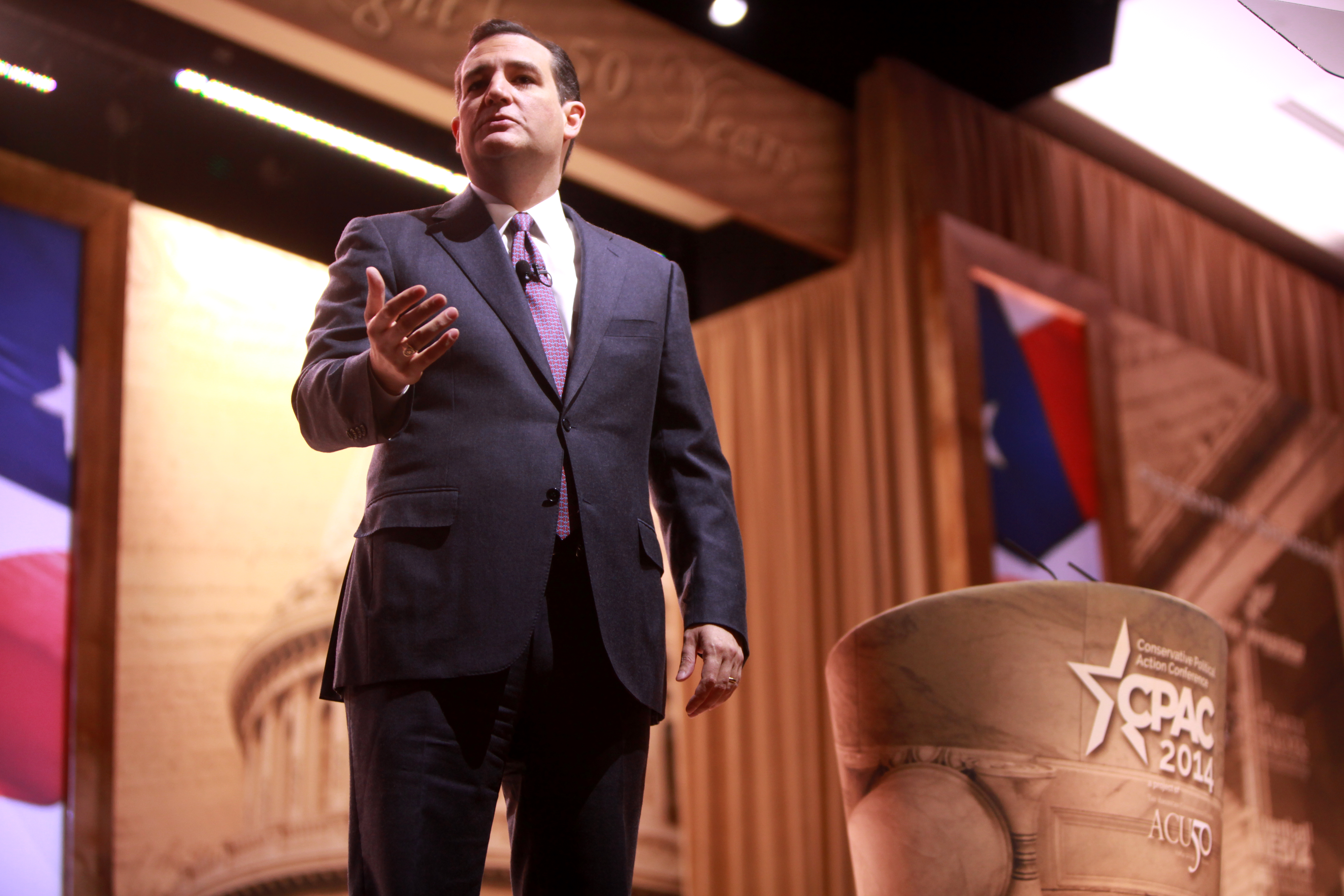
Senator Cruz speaking at the 2014 Conservative Political Action Conference (CPAC) in National Harbor, Maryland

Leading up to the 2016 presidential election cycle, commentators expressed their opinion that Cruz would run for President in 2016. On March 14, 2013, he gave the keynote speech at the 2013 Conservative Political Action Conference in Washington, D.C. He tied for 7th place in the 2013 CPAC straw poll on March 16, winning 4% of the votes cast. He performed even more strongly in the 2014 CPAC straw poll, coming in second with 11% behind Kentucky senator Rand Paul. In the 2015 CPAC poll, he came in third with 11.5% behind Wisconsin governor Scott Walker and Paul. In October 2013, Cruz won the Values Voter Summit Presidential straw poll with 42% of the vote, which was the highest percentage of any winning candidate in that poll's history. A year later, he won the same poll again by a smaller margin of 25%, becoming the first person to ever win more than one VVS straw poll. He came in first place in the two most recent Presidential straw polls conducted in 2014 with 30.33% of the vote at the Republican Leadership Conference and 43% of the vote at the Republican Party of Texas state convention.

Cruz spoke at events in the summer of 2013 across Iowa, New Hampshire and South Carolina, early primary states, leading to speculation that he was laying the groundwork for a run for President in 2016. On April 12, 2014, Cruz spoke at the Freedom Summit, an event organized by Americans for Prosperity and Citizens United. The event was attended by several potential presidential candidates. In his speech, Cruz mentioned that Latinos, young people and single mothers are the people most affected by the recession, and that the Republican Party should make outreach efforts to these constituents. He also said that the words "growth and opportunity" should be tattooed on the hands of every Republican politician.

Cruz, whose Canadian birth has prompted some to challenge his eligibility for presidential office under the natural-born-citizen clause, formally applied to renounce his dual Canadian citizenship in the run-up to his campaign, and ceased being a citizen of Canada on May 14, 2014.

== Campaign ==
=== Logo ===
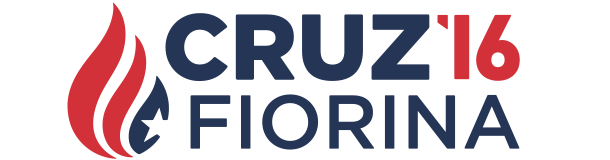

The campaign logo consisted of a Flag of the United States spliced with the Torch of Liberty. The design became one of the most recognized political brand logos during the 2016 Republican presidential primaries. It has also been compared to the Church of Pentecost symbol.

=== Announcement and preliminaries ===
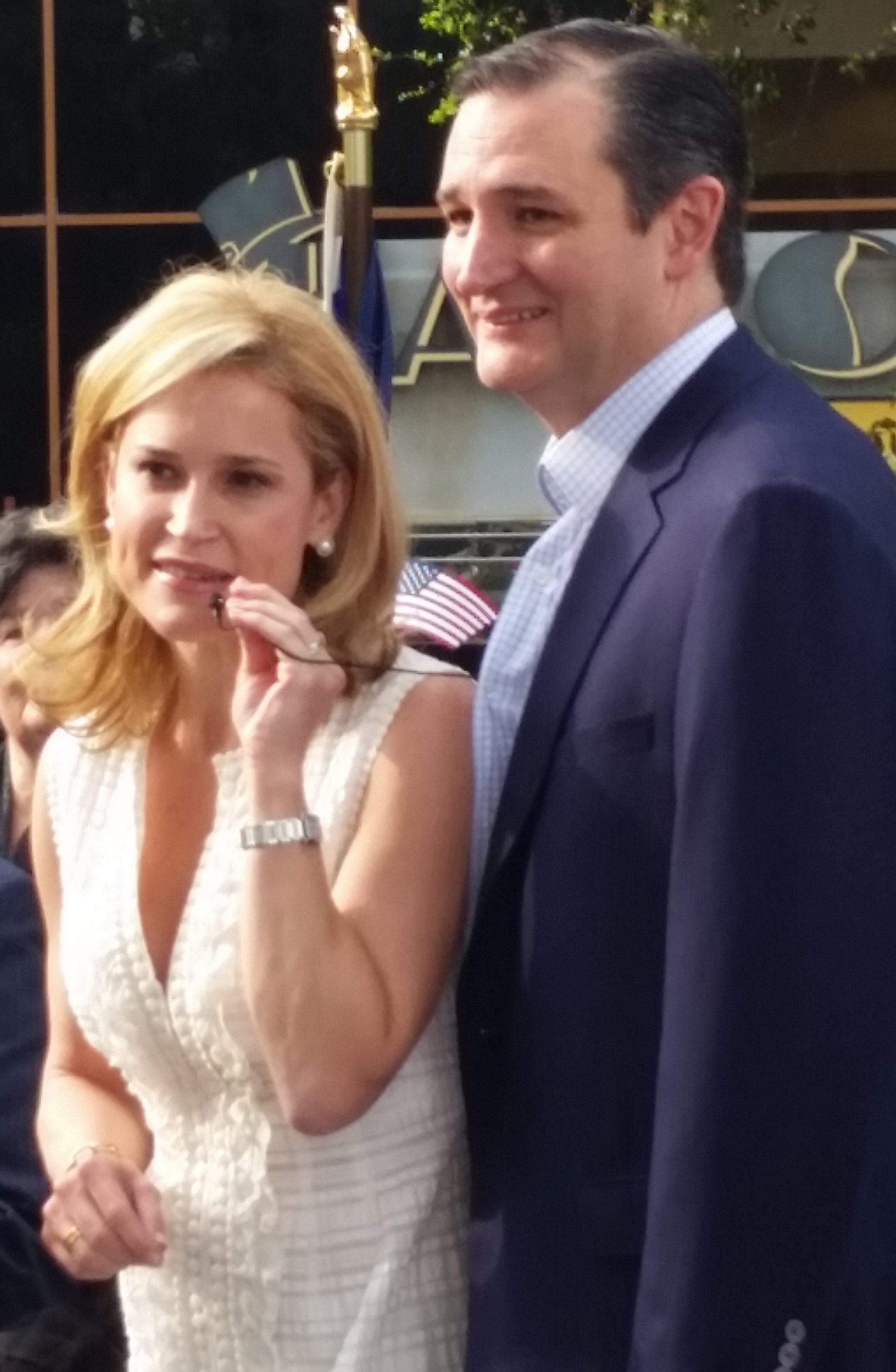
Cruz with his wife Heidi at a rally in Houston, March 2015

Cruz announced his campaign for the presidency on March 23, 2015, at Liberty University in Lynchburg, Virginia, during the student convocation. In his announcement speech, Cruz spoke of his plans for a constitutional government and said he would "stand for liberty". Cruz called on the audience to imagine a president repealing the Affordable Care Act and supporting Israel, economic growth, border security while allowing legal immigration, a flat tax and the abolition of the IRS. Liberty University students were required to attend the event, or else be fined, which the university's president Jerry Falwell Jr. confirmed adding, "No one is expected to agree with every speaker on every point." He became the first announced major Republican presidential candidate for the 2016 campaign. Cruz was believed to have initiated a long shot presidential bid, commentators referring to him as having no chance of winning the nomination, much less the general election, due to what was perceived as his lack of likability. Cruz, a freshman senator running for the presidency in his first term, faced comparisons to President Barack Obama who similarly ran for the presidency during his first term in the U.S. Senate. Cruz dispelled similarities by calling the president a "backbencher" who did not take positions on "whole lot of issues of consequence" during his tenure in the senate, which he argued could not be applied to him, in effect spending the first few days of his presidential campaign trying to distance himself from the incumbent president.

On April 1, Public Policy Polling showed Cruz in third place at 16%, behind potential candidates Jeb Bush and Scott Walker who were at 17% and 20%.

Cruz's name recognition significantly increased shortly after his campaign began, in April rising by 21 points to 82% from the 61% he had the previous month. Cruz welcomed several candidates into the race following their individual announcements of their candidacy for the presidency, praising them as well. A Des Moines Register poll released in May showed Cruz in eighth place at 5% among caucus goers. Cruz significantly increased his appearances in Iowa from June 2015. On June 18, the day after the Charleston church shooting, Cruz gave a speech empathizing with the lost lives and led onlookers in a moment of silence. At the same time, former political director Craig Robinson expressed that while he thought of Cruz as "the perfect caucus candidate", he did not feel he was committing to Iowa.

On August 3, 2015, Cruz was featured in YouTube video frying bacon off the end of a semi-automatic rifle at the Central Iowa Impact Gun Range in Boone, Iowa. "There is nothing I enjoy more than on weekends cooking breakfast with the family," Cruz said in the video. "Of course in Texas we cook bacon a little differently than most folks." The month of August also saw the release of a campaign video where Cruz promised in his opposition to Planned Parenthood to prosecute the organization for "selling body parts". In the first few months of the campaign, Cruz held campaign rallies in Tulsa, Columbus, Hoover, Huntsville and Montgomery.

=== August–September campaigning ===
Cruz successfully qualified for the first presidential debate of the election cycle, coming in 6th place in the overall list of the top 10 candidates. Cruz's performance was mostly well-received, although debate coach and strategist Michael Sheehan found him annoying and strategist Rick Wilson wondered if the performance, despite showing "Cruz-like brilliance", helped him as much as people thought. In an NBC News poll released on August 9, three days after the Ohio Republican presidential debate, Cruz came in 2nd place with 13% overall, more than doubling his prior support.

Cruz journeyed to the southern states in the days following the debate, eight of which being slated to cast ballots on March 1 on a day monikered the "SEC Primary". He courted voters while going on bus tours, his rivals spending time campaigning in Iowa. "Like the SEC does two-a-days, we're doing two-a-days here right now," Cruz campaign manager Jeff Roe said. "Everybody comes in for a Fourth of July event—a big speech, or some sort of cattle call—but spending the time, doing these type of events? We don't see that from anybody else." Cruz's public appearances throughout the southern states were well-publicized.

The second Republican presidential debate took place on September 16, at the Ronald Reagan Presidential Library and Museum in Simi Valley, California. As with the first debate, Cruz did not participate in the "verbal combat" between the other candidates, only criticizing former Presidents George H. W. Bush and George W. Bush for their appointments of David Souter and John Roberts to the Supreme Court, arguing the pair could have appointed conservatives in their place that would have voted "differently on cases that enraged the conservative base." In hindsight, Cruz's undistinguished Fox News and CNN debate performances were viewed as being purposeful, as he "was biding his time." In a poll released on September 20, four days after the debate, Cruz came in sixth place, tied with Mike Huckabee. Cruz visited Kentucky around this time, in support of the release of Kim Davis, but reportedly was blocked by an aide to Huckabee from appearing alongside her.

Days after fellow presidential candidate Donald Trump did not correct a man who claimed President Obama was a Muslim, a move that generated controversy and negative reception by the White House, Democrats and Republicans, Cruz declined to answer whether he thought the president was a Christian, reasoning that Obama's faith "is between him and God" and opted to give his stance that the Obama administration had been antagonistic towards Christians. Cruz debunked fellow presidential candidate Ben Carson's claim that a Muslim should not serve as president, saying, "The Constitution specifies there shall be no religious test for public office, and I'm a constitutionalist."

=== Post-CNBC debate ===
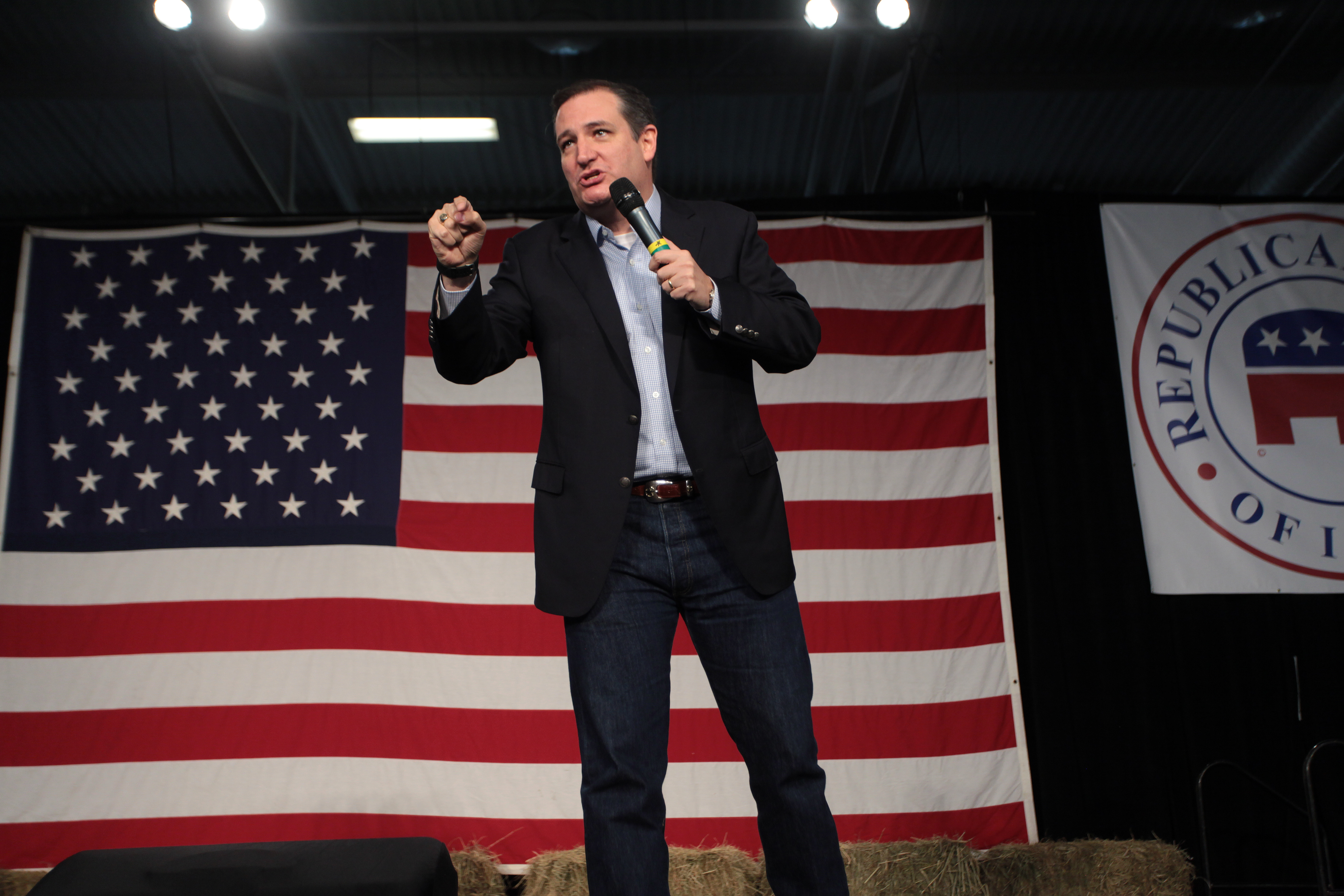
Cruz speaking at an event hosted by the Iowa Republican Party in October 2015

Cruz was a participant in the CNBC Republican presidential debate on October 28. In his opening statement, he stressed his willingness to govern properly, and later in the debate charged the moderators with asking bait questions. Cruz's performance was well-received, as he had "effectively articulated" his strategy of being the second choice for voters, enough of which would give him "the broadest base of support left when the dust clears." Cruz was also seen as having won the debate. Cruz was the most discussed of all candidates on Facebook the night of the debate and came in second to Donald Trump on Twitter for the most-talked about.

On October 31, Cruz was a speaker at a Growth and Opportunity Party event in Iowa. It was commented that Cruz received the biggest showing of the ten candidates present at the event. In a poll released on November 2, Cruz came in second place for favorability among Iowans, only surpassed by Ben Carson. Two other polls released the same day showed Cruz in third place in Iowa at 15%, behind Donald Trump and Ben Carson. In a Quinnipiac University poll, noted by Fox News as having been taken after the CNBC debate, Cruz came in fourth place at 13%, behind the two aforementioned candidates and Marco Rubio. Cruz stated shortly after the poll that the possibility of Rubio and himself being the last candidates remaining in the crowded field was a "plausible outcome."

As a result of many candidates feeling the CNBC debate was not balanced, some candidates signed a list of debate demands. Cruz refused to sign, stating in a Fox News interview that he wasn't "interested in signing letters." In November, The Courageous Conservatives PAC published a radio ad, stating, "Ted Cruz makes things happen. … After Sandy Hook, Ted Cruz stopped Obama's push for new gun-control laws." Connecticut Senator Chris Murphy said at the time of the ad's release that it made him want to vomit and he was sure these feelings were shared by those who had also lived through Sandy Hook.

On November 8, Cruz participated at the National Religious Liberties Conference in Des Moines, Iowa, alongside his father Rafael Cruz, Bobby Jindal and Mike Huckabee, and during a Q&A with the organizer of the event Kevin Swanson he said that "any president who doesn't begin everyday on his knees isn't fit to be commander-in-chief". In the conference, Kevin Swanson called for the execution of homosexuals. For which later, Cruz spokesman Rick Tyler called Swanson's statements "reprehensible" and given the comments "it was a mistake for Senator Cruz to appear at the event", stating that Cruz is against hatred or violence against homosexuals. On November 24, a Quinnipiac University poll was released with Cruz in second place in Iowa at 23%, only surpassed by Donald Trump. This was seen as evidence that Cruz was finally being able to garner the support of those who had supported candidates with no prior political experience such as frontrunners Trump and Carson, and establishing his credibility as a contender for the Republican Party's nomination. Additionally, it led some to believe that Cruz had made the right decision in avoiding conflicts with other candidates and focusing solely on his own substance.

=== Rise in the aftermath of the Paris attacks ===
The November 2015 Paris attacks significantly altered the Republican field, shifting the public focus to foreign policy and immigration. Though front-runner Trump—with a record of populist statements that were perceived both as hawkish and isolationist—was largely unaffected in his frontrunner status, second-place Ben Carson lost significant support in the immediate aftermath of the attack, as he was perceived as soft and inexperienced on foreign policy. Establishment favorite Jeb Bush also had his hopes of a late surge dimmed by his reputation as a moderate on immigration. In contrast, Rubio and Cruz, who had publicly taken hardline positions on both topics, saw their polls rise. By the end of November, poll averages showed Rubio in second place and Cruz in a close third place nationally.

In early December, a Monmouth University poll was released showing Cruz leading in Iowa at 24%. A CNN/ORC poll showed Cruz in second place to Trump among likely voters in the state's caucus with 20%. A December 12, The Des Moines Register poll showed a 10-point lead for Cruz while a December 14 CNN poll showed a 1-point lead for Cruz.

=== After CNN debate; early primaries ===
On December 15, Cruz participated in the second CNN Republican debate in Las Vegas, Nevada, the fifth overall of the election cycle, his overall performance being seen as strong and some commentators dubbing him the winner of the event. In the days following the debate, Cruz defended himself against claims by Rubio during the debate that he supported an immigration reform proposal two years prior in 2013 that would have included amnesty for undocumented immigrants, outright stating during a rally on December 17, "I oppose amnesty. I oppose citizenship. I oppose legalization for illegal aliens. I always have and I always will." December 22, coincidentally Cruz's 45th birthday, saw the release of a Quinnipiac poll where Cruz came in second place to Trump nationally, behind him by just four percentage points at 24%.

Pre-April 2016 campaign logo

By early January, Cruz continued to lead in Iowa, averaging 32%. However, a Quinnipiac University poll released on January 11 showed Cruz in second place to Trump at 29%, who had 31%. A Bloomberg/Des Moines Register poll released on January 13 showed Cruz in first place with 25%. Cruz was a participant in the second Fox Business debate on January 14, defending himself against the accusations of possible issues resulting from his birth in Canada while also indicating that the controversy was generated by his opponents due to his rise in the polls in the last few months as well as his senate record.

During the second Fox Business debate, Cruz was questioned on his meaning when he stated beforehand that Trump embodied New York values. He was also criticized for the statement by New York Republicans and Democrats. The January 15 issue of Daily News, released the day after the debate, had a front page reading, "Drop dead, Ted." The cover also called on him to return to Canada. Cruz acknowledged the criticism and apologized to New Yorkers "who have been let down by the liberal politicians in that state." He also apologized on behalf of Bill de Blasio for what he called his standing with "looters and the criminals" instead of law enforcement.

Cruz's opposition to ethanol led Iowa's governor, Terry Branstad, to publicly express disapproval of him on January 19, arguing that his win would be at the expense of jobs for Iowans and reduce income for farms. Branstad's comments were a far cry from the behavior of previous governors of the state during the Iowa caucus, who typically remained neutral. Hours after the governor's comments, Sarah Palin, who had been a supporter of Cruz during his run for the U.S. Senate four years prior, endorsed Trump. These events propelled Theodore Schleifer of CNN to conclude that Cruz "has had better days."

By late January, Trump had re-claimed the polling lead in Iowa, garnering 33% to Cruz's 27% in the polling averages just 6 days before the caucus. Cruz was a participant in the second Fox News debate. He was seen by some pundits as losing due to his defensive positions on his prior positions on immigration as well as subsidies for ethanol and falling flat on his attempts at humor.

On February 1, 2016, Cruz won the first Republican nomination contest, the Iowa Republican caucus. Cruz received 28% of caucus votes, with Donald Trump and Marco Rubio in second and third place at 24% and 23%, respectively. The clear victory was a surprise to many; analysts attributed the performance to Cruz's extensive grassroots organization in Iowa, having borrowed from Barack Obama's campaign in the 2008 Iowa Democratic presidential caucuses, where Obama had similarly outperformed two rivals in a statistically tied race. Cruz became the first Hispanic person to win the Iowa caucus in either party. However, not all subsequent press for Cruz was positive; Cruz's campaign received significant criticism after it was revealed that it was responsible for a voicemail with the false claim that Carson had quit the race, presumably an attempt to rally Carson's evangelical supporters towards Cruz's side.

February 9's New Hampshire primary, barely a week later, did not provide shocks; Cruz finished with 12% of the vote, behind Trump and Kasich, and ahead of Bush and Rubio. As Kasich and Bush had invested significantly in the New Hampshire race—hoping to win it and consolidate the moderate "lane"—the underwhelming results did not provide a boost to their campaigns.

Ahead of the February 20 South Carolina primary, Cruz and Rubio became entangled in a heated exchange in a CBS-hosted debate. Cruz referred to an interview of Rubio on Univision and alleged that Rubio had stated a different position on immigration from his public stance, in effect accusing him of pandering to the Hispanic audience. Rubio then responded with the accusation that Cruz could not speak Spanish and hence could not have understood his remarks. Cruz, agitated, asked in spoken Spanish for Rubio to continue his own statement in Spanish. Rubio brushed off the exchange and accused Cruz of frequent dishonesty, pointing to the controversy over the Iowa caucus in particular. The exchange became highly discussed in social media and was notable as the first instance of Spanish being spoken in an American major party presidential debate; Beto O'Rourke later did the same in a 2019 Democratic debate.

In the subsequent South Carolina Republican primary, Cruz narrowly finished 3rd behind Rubio by a tiny margin of 0.15%. The following day, Bush dropped out of the presidential race, while Cruz declared that he and Rubio had "effectively tied" for 2nd behind Trump, with the implication that both were vying for the status as the mainstream conservative challenger to Trump.

In Nevada, Cruz and Rubio were part of another tight battle for second, with Rubio claiming 24% of the vote and Cruz 21%.

=== Super Tuesday ===
Prior to the evening of the Iowa Caucus, the Marco Rubio and Ted Cruz campaigns used the published state voter roster entries to send targeted mailing to past Iowa voters. The mailing envelopes were designed to appear to originate from an election authority, with large wording announcing "VOTER VIOLATION" on the exterior in a bold red box. Some recipients stated they were intimidated by the content, which revealed their past voter participation and their adjacent neighbors' participation.

During caucus evening in Iowa, news reports from CNN reporters indicated correctly that Carson's itinerary was to go home to Florida before the night's caucus results and then to Washington, DC prayer breakfast, not New Hampshire or South Carolina; the Cruz campaign began to reference these reports in news interviews and Twitter posts, misrepresenting them as reporting indicating that Carson was planning to withdraw from the campaign. Cruz apologized via a direct phone call to Dr. Ben Carson later and repeated the apology in a CNN interview. Campaign surrogate Peter King defended his part in the events, and Cruz said that he would not punish any of his staff for spreading rumors of Carson's exit from the campaign.

At the New Hampshire ABC debate Donald Trump accused the Cruz campaign of "dirty tricks" for targeting Dr. Ben Carson during the caucusing in Iowa. Afterwards, Cruz's communications director, Rick Tyler, publicized a video with inaccurate subtitle captions portraying Marco Rubio criticizing the Bible. The next day, February 22, Tyler apologized to Rubio on his Facebook page for publishing the video. Shortly after that, Cruz requested Tyler's resignation.

After Tyler's resignation, Marco Rubio called Cruz "a liar" during the Houston CNN/Telemundo debate held February 25; Donald Trump repeated the "a liar" phrase targeting Cruz in that CNN debate and the two campaigns attributed the threads of alleged past deceit in Iowa, New Hampshire, South Carolina and Super Tuesday directly to Cruz, downplaying the Tyler resignation.

Analyzing the internal exit polling of the primary results, the impact of these accusations affected the evangelical Christian voters in the South Carolina candidate selection. Self-identified evangelicals did not agree with the candidate values of Donald Trump closely matching their values, but selected Donald Trump in a higher percentage than Cruz, the likely favored candidate among this group.

By the time of the Super Tuesday primaries and caucuses, on March 1, the exit polling results of evangelical Christian voters were at the anticipated levels, selecting Cruz over Donald Trump, with the exception of Virginia. In Virginia, the selection was Rubio over Trump and Cruz, with Trump the declared winner.

Cruz's campaign had positioned itself to rely heavily on his home state of Texas. Cruz also focused on Alaska, having never visited the state though believing his grassroots movement would suffice. In a poll released on February 28, Cruz maintained a lead in Texas by eleven points at 42%. Tom LoBianco of CNN said that a Cruz victory in Texas could slow Trump's momentum. Christopher Hooks of The Los Angeles Times stated that Cruz's campaign could be over with an underperformance in Texas, while viewing a large victory as allowing him to remain in the race "with renewed vigor." Cruz went to Texas the day prior to the primary to secure votes. On primary day, March 1, 2016, Cruz won Texas by 17% (beating the expectations of final polling numbers) along with Alaska and Oklahoma, providing him with four state primary victories total.

=== After Super Tuesday ===
On March 5, 2016, Cruz won the Kansas and Maine caucuses, giving him six statewide wins. Cruz won his widest margin in Kansas, where he beat Trump by 25 points. Cruz also tied Trump in Louisiana for the largest number of delegates earned from the Louisiana primary, with 18 delegates each. With his victories over Trump in Kansas and Maine, Cruz established himself as the candidate with the best opportunity to defeat Trump, the leading contender for the nomination. On March 6, 2016, in the Puerto Rico primaries, Cruz received 9% of the vote, placing him third behind Rubio and Trump. On March 8, 2016, Cruz won the Idaho primary with 45% of vote—defeating Trump by 17% and earning his seventh statewide victory. He placed second in Michigan, Mississippi, and Hawaii. The victory in Idaho solidified his claim as the best alternative to Donald Trump. On March 12, 2016, Cruz won the Wyoming county conventions with 67% of the vote, giving him his eighth statewide win. He took fourth at the District of Columbia convention.

Following Rubio's loss in Florida and suspension of his campaign on March 15, commentators noted that Cruz was becoming the surrogate for most of his supporters, including voters and other office holders. On March 17, Lindsey Graham, who previously indicated his dislike for Cruz on several occasions, said that he would both support and fundraise for him due to his belief that Cruz was capable of besting Trump in the primary. Shortly afterward, former Republican presidential nominee Mitt Romney expressed his support for Cruz over what he called "Trumpism". Jeb Bush endorsed Cruz on March 23, the anniversary of the campaign's announcement, calling Cruz a "principled conservative" and urging voters to reject Trump as a potential nominee.

On March 25, Cruz responded to a National Enquirer allegation that "political operatives" are investigating whether Cruz had been involved in extramarital affairs. In Oshkosh, Wisconsin, Cruz denied the allegations as "complete and utter lies" and called the article "garbage" and placed the blame for the falsehood on Donald Trump and his allies. On April 3, 2016, Cruz was interviewed by Megyn Kelly, and said that he had always been faithful to his wife.

On April 3, 2016, North Dakota elected a slate of delegates that was dominated by pro-Cruz delegates. Cruz received the support of the majority of the delegates. Two days later, Cruz won a victory in the Wisconsin primary with 48% of the vote and 36 of the 42 delegates. On April 8, Cruz received 21 of Colorado's 37 delegates, garnering the support of the remaining delegates the next day, April 9, during the state's Republican Convention. Also in April, amid polling showing that Trump had a massive lead in New York, Cruz began redirecting his focus to California, Republican voters there due to cast votes on June 7. Midway through April, Cruz traveled to Wyoming seeking to gather the 14 delegates for his campaign, though this plan conflicted with a group of the state's Republicans who hoped to send the delegates to the national convention in three months. On April 16, Cruz secured all of Wyoming's delegates at the state convention, prompting Trump to call the process "rigged" at a rally that day in Syracuse, New York.

On April 19, Trump won the New York primary, receiving the state's delegates and enlarging the gap between him and Cruz by over 300. The following day, April 20, Cruz said that no one would get the 1,237 delegates needed to secure the nomination and foresaw a contested convention. On April 22, the Cruz campaign was accused by Governor of Maine Paul LePage, who is a Trump supporter, of reversing its position after promising to back a "unity slate that would honor the wishes of the thousands of Mainers who voted at caucus." He furthered that Cruz campaign affiliate David Sawyer "stabbed us in the back, reneged on the unity slate, and betrayed the people of Maine." Cruz subsequently obtained 19 of 20 delegate slots for Maine.

=== Vice presidential choice; Indiana loss and suspension ===
Percentage of vote received by Cruz by state or territory. 0.0–9.9% 10.0–19.9% 20.0–29.9% 30.0–39.9% 40.0–49.9% 50.0%+

On April 27, 2016, in a move unusual for a candidate in a contested primary, Cruz announced that Carly Fiorina would be joining his campaign as his vice presidential running mate. This was one day after he lost a series of primaries in the northeast and later dropped out of the race. The Cruz campaign would later attribute their loss to not having selected Rubio as running mate, as hypothetical polling showed Cruz defeating Trump by a large margin with Rubio as the vice presidential candidate. However, Rubio denounced any interest at the time, which convinced the campaign to not approach him. On April 30, Former Governor of California Pete Wilson endorsed Cruz during a joint appearance at the state Republican Party's convention. The same day, it was reported that 10 of the 13 Virginia delegates at that state's Republican convention were loyal to Cruz.

The May 3 Indiana primary was widely seen as make or break for the Cruz campaign by commentators and pundits who speculated a loss for Cruz would mean a nomination for Trump. In a fundraising email, Cruz admitted that the state was pivotal to stopping Trump. On April 29, Governor of Indiana Mike Pence (candidate Trump's eventual running mate) said he would be voting for Cruz in the state primary, effectively endorsing him. On May 1, a poll was released showing Cruz with 34% support of Republican voters in Indiana, 15 points behind Trump. The same day, Cruz swore the campaign would continue regardless of the outcome of the primary. Following the Indiana primary on May 3, Cruz announced he was suspending his campaign.

== Eligibility ==
Questions have been raised as to whether Cruz meets the constitutional qualification that the President must be a natural born citizen as Cruz was born in Canada. Donald Trump, one of Cruz's opponents in the Republican primary, repeatedly questioned whether Cruz met the qualifications of being a natural born citizen.

Opinions, for the most part, concur that Cruz is eligible to serve as President of the United States; most constitutional scholars surveyed by Politico believe that he is eligible, and "a small, but vocal group" has issued challenges that he is not. According to a memo from the Congressional Research Service, "The weight of scholarly legal and historical opinion appears to support the notion that 'natural born Citizen' means one who is entitled under the Constitution or laws of the United States to U.S. citizenship 'at birth' or 'by birth,' including... those born abroad of one citizen parent who has met U.S. residency requirements."

Several lawsuits and ballot challenges asserting that Cruz is ineligible have been filed. No lawsuit or challenge has been successful, and in February 2016 the Illinois Board of Elections ruled in Cruz's favor, stating, "The candidate is a natural born citizen by virtue of being born in Canada to his mother who was a U.S. citizen at the time of his birth."

== Fundraising ==
Cruz raised nearly US$4 million in the first eight days after he announced his presidential campaign. 95% of the donations to Cruz's campaign came in contributions of less than US$100.

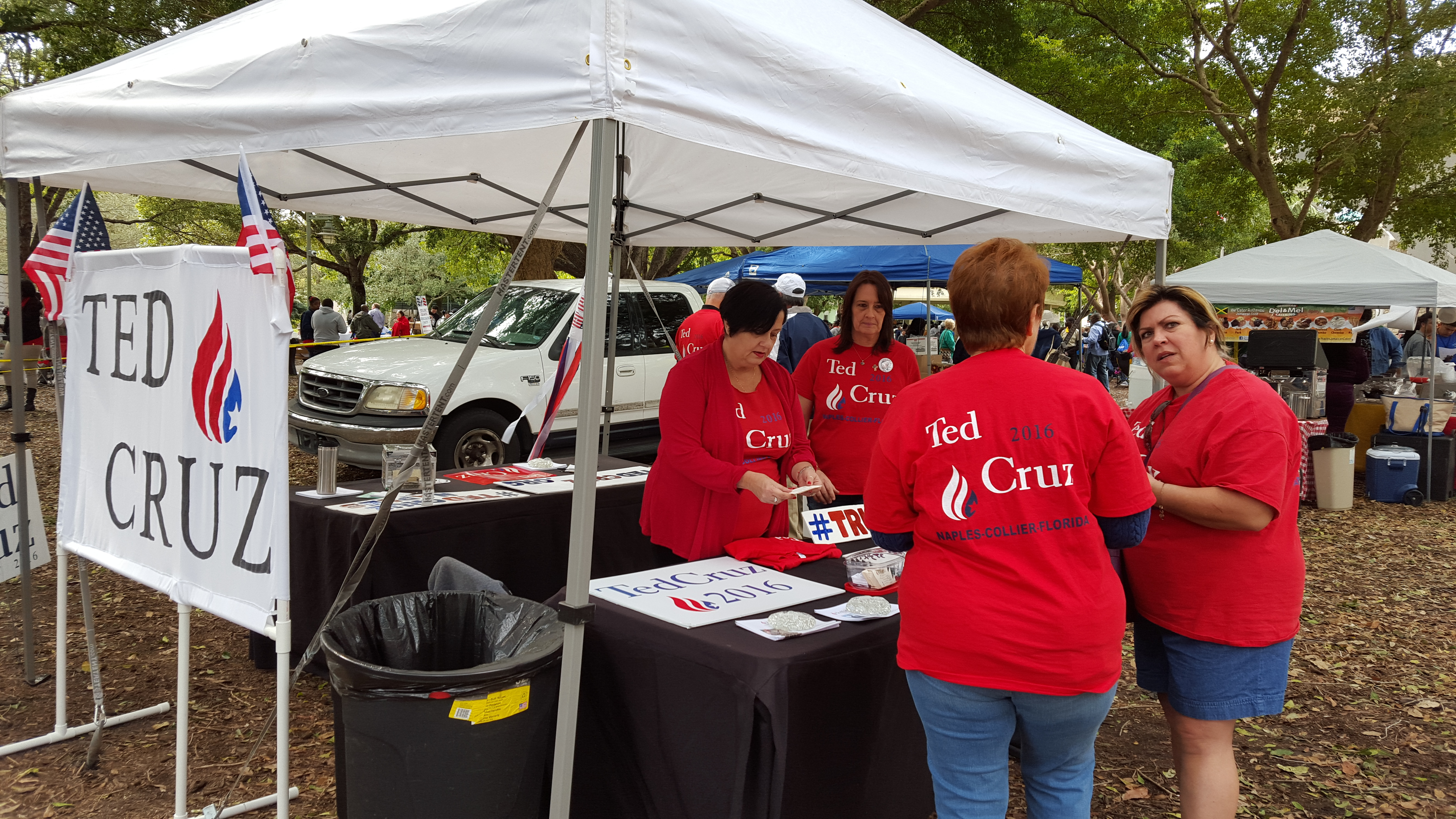
Ted Cruz supporters in Naples, Florida, January 2016

On April 8, 2015, it was reported that super PACs backing Cruz had raised US$31 million in a week, one of the biggest fundraising surges in modern presidential-race history to date. The Cruz campaign was funded by six separate super PACs, an unusually large number, described as "unprecedented" by CNN campaign finance experts. According to Dathan Voelter, treasurer of several of the PACs, this allows megadonors to exercise "influence and control" over how their money is spent on the campaign. Of the PACs, Keep the Promise I is funded primarily by a US$11 million donation from Robert Mercer, Keep the Promise II is funded entirely from a US$10 million donation from Toby Neugebauer, and Keep the Promise III is funded by US$15 million donated by Dan and Farris Wilks, two billionaire brothers from Cruz's home state of Texas, and their wives. As of July 25, a total of US$38 million was pledged to Keep The Promise super PACs.

Within the first 48 hours after the second Republican primary debate, Cruz's campaign raised US$1 million, the result of more than 15,000 donations, the average being US$49.54. Cruz said he was "thrilled by the outpouring of financial support we've seen in such a short amount of time".

On October 8, the Cruz campaign announced US$12 million during the previous fundraising quarter, noted by The New York Times as being "substantially less" than that of Ben Carson's campaign who raised US$20 million in the same time but double than that of Marco Rubio, who had raised US$6 million within that period. in a campaign statement, it was reported more than 6,000 of his contributors had pledged intentions to make recurring donations every month. By this point, according to the Campaign Finance Institute, Cruz was in second place in the Republican primary for large donors, after Jeb Bush. On October 26, billionaire Darwin Deason announced alongside "five other wealthy Texans" that they would be aboard his campaign. The donors beforehand supported Rick Perry prior to his presidential campaign ending the previous month.

Less than 24 hours after the CNBC Republican presidential debate, the Cruz campaign raised US$1.1 million in what was the third straight post debate US$1 million fundraising haul. Over the last three months of 2015, Cruz raised US$20 million, increasing his campaign's finances by 66% from its earnings of the previous quarter. Campaign manager Jeff Roe in a memo reported that the Cruz campaign had received 300,000 donors' contributions and told supporters that the campaign had "a network in place with the resources required to win that is the envy of every other campaign." On January 7, Cruz's campaign was joined by Republican megadonor Dick Uihlein, who donated US$1 million to his super PAC. Drew Ryun, who works for the Cruz super PAC, said Uihlein was in the top five of the courted Republican donors and called landing him a "good shot in the arm for Ted" as well as boosting the campaign in Iowa. On January 20, in an interview with Mark Levin, Cruz announced that his campaign had superseded US$50 million. More than 40% of Cruz's donations that month came from small donors that he was capable of repeatedly requesting contributions from.

== Strategy ==
Cruz's campaign strategy relied heavily in gain support of evangelical leaders, donors and voters.

Theodore Schleifer of CNN wrote of Cruz's campaign strategy, "Raise enough money to go the distance, court the fans of other conservative candidates who inevitably drop out, and emerge in the spring as the clear conservative alternative to an establishment favorite like Bush." Barnes acknowledged doubts that Cruz could win the general election, stressing that he would have to carry states won by Mitt Romney during the 2012 presidential election and reverse several victories by President Obama to gain enough electoral votes.

Cruz himself believed that the 2016 election will be similar to the 1980 presidential election, suggesting the eventual Republican nominee can win the election through being a conservative and appealing to those types of voters. Cruz has often repeated a line from Ronald Reagan, that to win the election, the Republican Party should be "raising a banner of no pale pastels, but bold colors." The Cruz campaign noted that four million conservative voters did not turn out during the previous election, though Barnes noted previous defeats of Republican nominees even when these voters deployed.

Politico's Kenneth P. Vogel reported in July 2015 that Cruz had partnered with London-based Cambridge Analytica to collect and analyze data on American voters and using strategic communication to manage voter behavior.

Multiple times in the campaign, Cruz has done impressions or impersonations of John F. Kennedy and made claims that Kennedy would be a Republican if he were alive today. The Kennedy family has spoken out condemning the claims with open letters to the media regarding the positions of Kennedy and Cruz.

In April 2016, the campaigns of Cruz and John Kasich agreed to "split up" some of the remaining primaries in an effort to block Donald Trump from gaining the 1,237 delegates necessary to clinch the GOP nomination. However, the pact proved challenging; for example, though Cruz was intended to focus on the Indiana primary, Kasich said that his supporters should still vote for him there. And days later, Cruz clarified that there is "no alliance" but, rather, he and Kasich "made a determination where to focus [the campaigns'] energies."

=== Garnering supporters from other candidates ===
With Rick Perry's exit from the race on September 11, David Johnson, one of Perry's backers in Iowa, reported being approached by Cruz Iowa state director Bryan English who asked if he would consider "another Texan for president". Additionally, Doug Deason, the son of a $5 million donor to Perry's super PAC, mentioned at the time of his dropping out that he had dined with Cruz "a few evenings ago" and was contacted by Cruz finance director Willie Langston.

After Scott Walker dropped out of the race on September 21, Cruz's campaign website announced its signing of all three of Walker's Georgia grassroots co-chairmen. In early November, Cruz's campaign was joined by former Walker Iowa strategist David Polyansky.

On September 28, Cruz released a video showing eight former supporters of Ron Paul who had begun backing him and announced that Bob Barr would chair the coalition of the Cruz campaign composed of libertarian-leaning Republicans. Katie Zezima of The Washington Post wrote that the former Ron Paul supporters would have been inclined to support his son Rand Paul's presidential campaign. On January 10, Sam Pimm, who worked for the Ben Carson campaign in New Hampshire, publicly announced he was withdrawing from Carson's campaign to support Cruz. Pimm expressed his belief that Carson could not win the nomination and viewed Cruz as having a higher probability of doing so.

=== Relationship with Donald Trump ===
On August 10, Cruz cautioned rival Republican presidential candidates from dismissing Trump, citing that he was attracting large crowds and doing so would not help Republicans reclaim the White House. On September 9, Cruz and Trump made a joint appearance at a rally opposing the 2015 international nuclear agreement with Iran. On November 17, Trump named Cruz when asked about a potential running mate, citing that he liked Cruz and that the senator had backed everything he had said. On November 30, Cruz stated during a town hall meeting in Iowa that he believed Trump would not be the nominee. It was observed by some commentators that Cruz was straying from insulting or making any disparaging remarks towards Donald Trump in an effort to get his supporters. Despite this, Cruz came in third place in a Fox News poll, behind Trump and Carson. Tied with Marco Rubio, the poll was said to "poked a hole in the narrative" along with Ben Carson's support rising from 23% to 33% in a poll without Trump while Cruz only went up from 11% to 13%. It was noted by commentators that although Cruz could gain the supporters of Trump should he drop out, there was also the possibility that he would not, which would lead to this effort being for naught.

In private remarks to donors that were leaked, former President George W. Bush reportedly said that he did not like Cruz and found him to be opportunistic toward Trump, also stressing his belief that Cruz would be a "pretty formidable candidate" to Jeb Bush around the south. Though the Cruz campaign initially declined commenting on the rumors, Cruz released a public statement where he expressed his "great respect" for the former president and that he would "always be grateful to him" since he met his wife while working on his presidential campaign in 2000. Cruz reasoned that Bush's remarks were made to support his brother, the cause of his additional commenting on other candidates, though Cruz refused to "reciprocate" any attacks.

On December 11, during an appearance in Iowa, Trump admitted to liking Cruz, but mentioned that "not a lot of evangelicals come out of Cuba". The comment was seen as a reference to Cruz's father Rafael Cruz, who had escaped from Cuba in his early adulthood and was viewed as Trump's first attack on Cruz. Following those remarks, on December 13, Trump went on to say that he had "far better judgement" than Cruz, citing his opposition to the Iraq War as an example.

Trump was involved in questioning of Cruz's eligibility for the presidency in January and claimed he was trying to help Cruz, who argued that in politics, "it's fairly unusual for your opponents who are running for the same position to be actually trying to help you". Cruz responded to Trump on January 12 with the assertion that he and Hillary Clinton knew each other well and that "it's interesting that Hillary Clinton's key supporters are doing everything they can to echo Donald's attacks on me." After Cruz and Trump had several exchanges in the Fox Business debate on January 14, Trump said after the debate that he believed "the bromance" between the pair had ended. On January 17, Trump acknowledged Cruz had been "so nice to me" before dubbing him "a nasty guy" and adding: "Nobody likes him, nobody in Congress likes him, nobody likes him anywhere once they get to know him." Cruz said on January 25 that Trump potentially could become "unstoppable" if he were to win Iowa, at the same time mentioning his substantial lead in New Hampshire and arguing that his campaign was the only one that could defeat Trump in Iowa.

With Trump declining to participate in the January 28 Fox News debate, Cruz invited him to a one-on-one debate, saying he would like to invite Trump if the latter was afraid of Megyn Kelly and launching a website seeking support of those in favor of a debate between the two candidates. Trump's campaign responded by saying Trump would debate Cruz if the two became the last candidates in the race. Cruz lampooned Trump at the Fox News debate, saying, "Now, secondly, let me say I'm a maniac and everyone on this stage is stupid, fat, and ugly. And Ben, you're a terrible surgeon. Now that we've gotten the Donald Trump portion out of the way...." On January 31, Trump criticized Cruz for a controversial mailer that the Cruz campaign sent to voters in Iowa. The mailer was designed to look like an official document that accused the recipient of a "VOTING VIOLATION" for failure to turn out in past elections. The mailer was promptly condemned by Iowa Secretary of State Paul Pate who said the mailer "misrepresents the role of my office, and worse, misrepresents Iowa election law."

== See also ==
- Political positions of Ted Cruz
- 2016 Republican Party presidential primaries
- 2016 Republican Party presidential candidates
- 2016 Republican Party presidential debates and forums
- Ted Cruz's speech at the 2016 Republican National Convention
