= Political positions of Ted Cruz =

Ted Cruz speaking at AIPAC

As a member of the Republican Party, Ted Cruz is a United States Senator representing the state of Texas, and was a 2016 candidate for US President.

Cruz has been described as a movement conservative, a social conservative and a constitutional conservative with libertarian leanings.

Regarding economic policy, Cruz supports free trade; wishes to abolish the Internal Revenue Service and implement a single tax for all citizens; opposes a higher minimum wage; and supports downsizing the United States government. On domestic and social policy, Cruz is pro-life, against Obamacare, same-sex marriage, civil unions, legalization of marijuana, net neutrality, and immigration reform. He is in favor of the death penalty, the USA Freedom Act, school choice, and gun rights. Environmentally, Cruz is opposed to both the scientific consensus on climate change and the Water Resources Development Act. Finally, in regard to foreign policy, Cruz is "somewhere in between" Rand Paul's non-interventionist position and John McCain's active interventionism; Cruz opposes the Joint Comprehensive Plan of Action against Iran, the United States–Cuban Thaw, and the Agenda 21 action plan with other countries.

== Economic policy views ==
Since being elected, Cruz has criticized the political and economic policies of the Barack Obama administration. Chiding fellow Republicans over their 2012 electoral losses, he stated that "Republicans are and should be the party of the 47 percent" and has also noted that the words "growth and opportunity" ought to be tattooed on every Republican's hand.

In February 2014, Cruz opposed an unconditional increase in the debt limit. He said that Republican politicians feared the truth and "wanted to be able to tell what they view as their foolish, gullible constituents back home they didn't do it."

=== Trade ===
Cruz has been described by the Cato Institute's Center for Trade Policy Studies as a "free trader" and as a "free-trade advocate" by The Wall Street Journal. Cruz initially was a supporter of trade promotion ("fast track") authority to speed up approval of the controversial Trade Promotion Authority free trade agreement, writing a Wall Street Journal op-ed in support of the measure in April 2015 and voting in favor of it in the Senate the following month. However, on the eve of a crucial Senate vote on fast track in June 2015, Cruz flipped positions and abandoned his previous support.

Cruz is an opponent of the Export-Import Bank of the United States, an agency that "provides relatively low-cost financing to foreign buyers of American products and services."

=== Taxes ===
In 2013, Cruz proposed the abolition of the Internal Revenue Service (IRS) and the implementation of a flat tax "where the average American can fill out taxes on a postcard." The Dallas Morning News reported that Cruz's proposal "was a bold prescription that meshes with Cruz's persona as a brash change agent. It drew cheers from a well-heeled Manhattan crowd. But as policy from a U.S. senator, it strikes liberal critics as demagoguery, and tax experts as half-baked."

During his 2016 presidential campaign, Cruz reiterated his call to "abolish the IRS and end its abuse of power and violation of Americans' constitutional rights." Cruz also proposed a flat tax at an unspecified level. as well as the elimination of the estate tax.

Cruz opposes the Marketplace Fairness Act, saying that imposing an internet sales and use tax imposes a burdensome tax that will hurt competition by creating additional costs for internet-based businesses.

In April 2015, as a Republican presidential candidate, Cruz signed Grover Norquist's anti-tax pledge.

=== Minimum wage ===
Cruz is "adamantly opposed to a higher minimum wage."

In January 2015, Cruz opposed President Obama's plan to raise the federal minimum wage to $10.10 per hour, stating that he believes it would cause large-scale job loss. When discussing whether or not to have a minimum wage in general, Cruz stated "I think the minimum wage consistently hurts the most vulnerable."

=== Scope of government ===
Cruz wants to decrease the size of the government significantly. In addition to eliminating the IRS as described above, Cruz has promised to eliminate four other cabinet level agencies. Cruz proposes to eliminate the Department of Energy, the Department of Education, the Department of Commerce, and the Department of Housing and Urban Development.

== Domestic and social policy ==
=== Abortion and reproductive care ===
Cruz is "strongly anti-abortion" and "would allow the procedure only when a pregnancy endangers the mother's life." He supports cutting federal funding to Planned Parenthood. In January 2016, Cruz announced his "Pro-Lifers for Cruz" coalition, chaired by Tony Perkins; co-chairs include Troy Newman, who has previously stated that the government has a responsibility to execute abortion doctors "in order to expunge bloodguilt [sic] from the land and people."

=== Boycotts ===
In 2019, Ted Cruz encouraged a boycott of Nike after the company removed the Betsy Ross flag from shoes (the flag had been criticized as glorifying slavery and racism).

In 2020, amid boycotting of Goya Foods by various Latino public figures including Alexandria Ocasio-Cortez, Julian Castro, and Lin-Manuel Miranda for its praise of Trump, Cruz condemned the boycott and said they were an attempt to "silence free speech."

=== Capital punishment ===
Cruz favors the death penalty. In his 2012 Senate campaign, Cruz frequently mentioned his role as counsel for the State of Texas in Medellín v. Texas, a 2008 case in which the U.S. Supreme Court found that Texas has the legal right to ignore an order from the International Court of Justice directing the U.S. to review the convictions and sentences of dozens of Mexican nationals on death row. Cruz has referred to Medellín as the most important case of his tenure as Texas solicitor general.

In September 2015, after Pope Francis called for the global abolition of capital punishment in a speech before a joint session of Congress during a visit to the United States, Cruz said that he disagreed with the pope and Catholic teachings against the death penalty, telling Politico, "I believe the death penalty is a recognition of the preciousness of human life."

=== Civil liberties and electronic surveillance ===
In 2015, Cruz voted in favor of the USA Freedom Act, which reauthorized the USA Patriot Act but reformed some of its provisions. Cruz's stance was in contrast with the stances of his rivals for the Republican presidential nomination, including Senator Rand Paul (who voted against the act because it did not go far enough in curtailing NSA spying) and Marco Rubio (who voted against the Freedom Act because he favored reauthorization of the Patriot Act without any reform).

In 2014, Cruz expressed agreement with Democrats such as Senator Patrick Leahy that "the sweep of the surveillance has been far too broad with respect to law-abiding citizens." Cruz said Americans want to see "far greater scrutiny on bad guys, people that we have reason to suspect may be planning a terrorist attack" and "far more protection for law-abiding citizens."

In 2013, following the revelations of NSA whistleblower Edward Snowden, Cruz said: "If it is the case that the federal government is seizing millions of personal records about law-abiding citizens, and if it is the case that there are minimal restrictions on accessing or reviewing those records, then I think Mr. Snowden has done a considerable public service by bringing it to light. If Mr. Snowden has violated the laws of this country, there are consequences to violating laws and that is something he has publicly stated he understands and I think the law needs to be enforced."

Cruz is opposed to the indefinite detention provision of the National Defense Authorization Act, stating that he believes "the Constitution does not allow President Obama, or any President, to apprehend an American citizen, arrested on U.S. soil, and detain these citizens indefinitely without a trial."

=== Disaster relief ===
In 2013, Cruz voted against the bill to provide a package of federal aid to the East Coast for recovery from Hurricane Sandy. In 2015, in the wake of fatal flooding in Texas, he supported federal aid funding; in 2017, he called for federal intervention as Hurricane Harvey approached the coast of Texas.

Cruz has defended this, pointing to the approximately $9.8 billion in federal aid which Texas received from disaster relief bills following Hurricane Harvey and contrasting it with the $51 billion budget he opposed following Hurricane Sandy. The estimated cost of the damage resulting from Hurricane Harvey was almost twice that of Hurricane Sandy.

=== Education ===
Cruz is a proponent of school choice and opposes the Common Core State Standards Initiative.

During his 2012 Senate campaign, Cruz called for the abolition of the U.S. Department of Education. Cruz has not indicated what "steps he might take to lower the cost of college, or make student debt more manageable."

In March 2013, Cruz proposed an amendment to repeal the Health Care and Education Reconciliation Act of 2010, which "shifted loans from private banks to federal direct lending, lowered monthly payments for income-based repayment plans, and greatly expanded Pell Grants." In 2014, Cruz voted to block the Student Emergency Loan Refinancing Act (a bill sponsored by Senator Elizabeth Warren, Democrat of Massachusetts) from a Senate floor vote.

=== Gun rights ===
Cruz is a gun rights supporter. On March 25, 2013, an announcement was made by Cruz and U.S. Senators Rand Paul and Mike Lee threatening to filibuster any legislation that would entail gun control, such as the Manchin-Toomey Amendment, which would require additional background checks on sales at gun shows. On April 17, 2013, Cruz voted against the Manchin-Toomey Amendment. Republicans successfully filibustered the amendment by a vote of 54–46, as 60 votes were needed for cloture.

In April 2015, Cruz stated "what I have been pressing is the Armed Services Committee" to hold hearings on whether service members should be allowed to carry concealed firearms on military bases. He believes that service members should be better equipped to protect themselves from incidents like the Navy Yard and Fort Hood mass shootings. He further added, "I think it's very important to have a public discussion about why we're denying our soldiers the ability to exercise their Second Amendment rights".

=== Health care ===
Cruz is a strong critic of the Affordable Care Act (the ACA or "Obamacare"). He has sponsored legislation that would repeal the health care reform law and its amendments in the Health Care and Education Reconciliation Act of 2010.

After the launch of the HealthCare.gov website, with which there were significant implementation problems, Cruz stated, "Obamacare is a disaster. You have the well-publicized problems with the website. It just isn't working." He called for Health and Human Services Secretary Kathleen Sebelius to resign.

In 2014, some say Cruz unintentionally gave majority leader Harry Reid the procedural opening he needed to allow a Senate vote to confirm Vivek Murthy, who had raised concerns about the health effects of gun ownership, to be United States Surgeon General, though it has been reported Reid intended to push through the remaining confirmations of President Obama's nominees regardless.

In the summer of 2013, Cruz started a "nationwide tour" sponsored by The Heritage Foundation to promote a congressional effort to defund the Affordable Care Act, arguing that Republicans should unite in upcoming Continuing Resolution negotiations to defund Obamacare and with regard to a potential government shutdown Cruz downplayed worries of the political risk to Republicans by citing the results of the 1996 midterm elections.

On September 24, 2013, Cruz began a speech on the floor of the Senate regarding the Affordable Care Act relative to a continuing resolution designed to fund the government and avert a government shutdown. Cruz promised to keep speaking until he was "no longer able to stand". Cruz yielded the floor at noon the following day for the start of the proceeding legislative session after twenty-one hours nineteen minutes. His speech was the fourth-longest in United States Senate history. Following Cruz's speech, the Senate voted 100–0 regarding a "procedural hurdle toward passing a stopgap funding bill to avert a government shutdown". Cruz was joined by 18 Republican senators in his effort to prevent stripping out a clause that would have defunded the Affordable Care Act by voting against the cloture motion, leaving the effort 21 votes short of the required number to deny cloture.

Cruz is cited in the press as having been a major force behind the U.S. government shutdown in 2013. Cruz delivered a message on October 11, 2013 to fellow Republicans against accepting Obamacare and, describing it as a "train wreck", said the American people remain "energized" around the goal of gutting the law. Cruz stated Obamacare is causing "enormous harm" to the economy. Republican strategist Mike Murphy stated: "Cruz is trying to start a wave of Salem witch trials in the G.O.P. on the shutdown and Obamacare, and that fear is impacting some people's calculations on 2016." Cruz said that he "didn't threaten to shut down the government" and blamed the shutdown on President Barack Obama and Senate Majority Leader Harry M. Reid.

The Houston Chronicle, which had endorsed Cruz in the general election, regretted that he had not lived up to the standard set by the previous U.S. Senator from Texas, Kay Bailey Hutchison. After a deal was made to end the shutdown and extend the debt-ceiling deadline, Senate Republican leader Mitch McConnell called Cruz's actions "not a smart play" and a "tactical error", and Cruz stated: "I would do anything, and I will continue to do anything I can, to stop the train wreck that is Obamacare. The test that matters [...], is are we doing anything for all the people that are getting hurt from Obamacare?" In March 2015, Cruz announced his wife would be taking an unpaid leave of absence and would no longer have access to health insurance through her employer, so they purchased private insurance rather than enter the health care exchange.

=== Immigration ===
Cruz has adopted a "hard-line stance" on immigration issues during the 2014 border crisis. Cruz is an opponent of comprehensive immigration reform. He has said that he disagreed with the amnesty for illegal immigration that occurred in 1986 under Ronald Reagan. Cruz opposes the Obama administration's Deferred Action for Childhood Arrivals (DACA) program, which protects undocumented youth who came to the United States as children ("DREAMers") from deportation. Cruz has demanded an "end to DACA as a prerequisite for even the most minor immigration legislation." In September 2014, referring to the DACA, Cruz said "I think we should use any and all means necessary to prevent the president from illegally granting amnesty," raising speculation that he might attempt to force a government shutdown over the issue. According to some Republicans who worked with him, in his work in the George W. Bush administration, and as a board member of the Washington-based Hispanic Alliance for Prosperity Institute, Cruz helped craft policies to allow undocumented immigrants to stay in the United States and pursue legal status, though none of those efforts granted automatic amnesty to undocumented workers.

During the 2012 Republican primary race for U.S. Senate in Texas, Cruz stated that he favored building a wall along the entire U.S.-Mexico border. Cruz also said that he supports a requirement that businesses use E-Verify, which is an electronic program to verify whether someone is allowed to legally work in the United States.

In 2013, Cruz offered an amendment to the Senate comprehensive immigration bill seeking an immediate 500% increase (from 65,000 to 325,000 annually) in skilled foreign workers entering the United States using H-1B visas. Cruz's amendment was defeated in the Senate Judiciary Committee (which approved a smaller increase instead), and the underlying bill was never acted upon by the House.

=== LGBT issues ===
Cruz believes that "engaging in homosexual conduct is a choice." He thinks that marriage should be legally defined as only "between one man and one woman," but believes that the legality of same-sex marriage should be left to each state to decide. On February 10, 2015, Cruz re-introduced the State Marriage Defense Act. Cruz opposes participation in gay pride marches, criticizing Dallas' Republican mayor Tom Leppert, stating "When a mayor of a city chooses twice to march in a parade celebrating gay pride that's a statement and it's not a statement I agree with." He voted against reauthorizing the Violence Against Women Act, which included provisions to extend protection to lesbians and gays. In a speech in April 2015 in Waukee, Iowa, Cruz said that "[t]here is a liberal fascism that is dedicated to going after believing Christians who follow the biblical teaching on marriage."

In 2015, following the U.S. Supreme Court's decision in Obergefell v. Hodges, which declared that the constitutional right to marriage extended to same-sex couples, Cruz urged states to ignore the ruling, saying that states who are not parties to a suit are not legally obligated to follow the decision. Legal scholars said that this statement is correct in a technical sense, but not meaningful, since lower courts are bound by the Supreme Court's constitutional rulings and non-compliance with the decision "amounts at most to a delaying tactic." Stephen Vladeck, law professor at American University, called Cruz's statement "literally true, but deeply misleading."

At the National Religious Liberties Conference in November 2015, Cruz also shared the stage with Kevin Swanson, who called for gays to be put to death.

On Kim Davis, a county clerk in Kentucky who was jailed for contempt of court after refusing to comply with a federal court order directing her to issue marriage licenses to all those legally qualified, Cruz stated: "Today, judicial lawlessness crossed into judicial tyranny. Today, for the first time ever, the government arrested a Christian woman for living according to her faith ... I stand with Kim Davis. Unequivocally." Washington Post columnist Dana Milbank called this statement "downright alarming" and criticized Cruz for "seeking the nation's highest office while encouraging people to ignore its laws."

In July 2022 while speaking at a Turning Point student conference, he declared that his preferred pronouns were kiss/my/ass.

After Ugandan president Yoweri Museveni signed the Anti-Homosexuality Act, 2023 into law, Cruz condemned its passage, stating that "[a]ny law criminalizing homosexuality or imposing the death penalty for 'aggravated homosexuality' is grotesque & an abomination." He also stated that Texas should repeal the state law that criminalises homosexuality.

=== Marijuana ===
Cruz opposes the legalization of marijuana, but believes it should be decided at the state level.

=== Technology ===
Cruz opposes net neutrality regulations arguing that the Internet economy has flourished in the United States simply because it has remained largely free from government regulation. He believes regulating the Internet will stifle online innovation and create monopolies. He has expressed support for stripping the Federal Communications Commission (FCC) of its power under Section 706 of the Telecommunications Act of 1996, and opposes reclassifying internet service providers as common carriers under Title II of the Communications Act of 1934.

In January, 2025, Cruz, along with senators Chris Murphy, Katie Britt, and Brian Schatz, introduced the Kids Off Social Media Act (KOSMA). In addition, the Act was co-sponsored by senators John Curtis, Peter Welch, John Fetterman, Ted Budd, Mark Warner, and Angus King. This Act would set a minimum age of 13 to use social media platforms and prevent social media companies from feeding "algorithmically-targeted" content to users under the age of 17. Cruz said of this, "Every parent I know is concerned about the online threats to kids—from predators to videos promoting self-harm, risky behavior, or low self-esteem. Many families have suffered due to Big Tech’s failure to take responsibility for its products. The Kids Off Social Media Act addresses these issues by supporting families in crisis and empowering teachers to better manage their classrooms".

Cruz opposes regulating artificial intelligence (AI). In June 2025, he added text to a budget reconciliation bill to prevent states that enact regulations on AI from receiving federal funding for broadband projects.

== Environmental policy views ==
=== Climate change, energy policy, and EPA ===
Cruz rejects the scientific consensus on climate change. In January 2015, Cruz voted for a Senate amendment stating that climate change is real but voted against an amendment stating that climate change was real and that humans were significantly contributing to it. In a March 2015 interview with the Texas Tribune, Cruz called environmental advocates concerned "global warming alarmists" and claimed that they are "the equivalent of the flat-earthers."

Cruz has also claimed that "satellite data demonstrate that there has been no significant warming whatsoever for 17 years." The Annenberg Public Policy Center's FactCheck.org stated that this was "misleading" and that "Cruz cherry-picks data to arrive at a spurious conclusion." The Washington Post fact-checker said that this statement was "not correct" and a "highly misleading statement to the average viewer or reader."

As chairman of the United States Senate Commerce Subcommittee on Space, Science and Competitiveness, Cruz has criticized NASA for conducting what he considers to be too much research on climate change and Earth science, stating that research into these fields are not part of the "core function of NASA." FactCheck.org said that Cruz's comments "made some misleading claims regarding the agency's budgets and the science that it conducts" and noted that research into earth and atmospheric sciences has been fundamental to NASA's mission since the agency's inception."

Cruz received more than US$1 million in campaign donations from the oil and gas industry since 2011. Cruz is an opponent of the EPA, calling it "unbelievably abusive" and "populated by zealots," and has accused the Obama administration of waging a "war on coal." Cruz opposes EPA's Clean Power Plan, which aims to cut carbon emissions from power plants; Cruz accused President Obama of engaging in a "lawless and radical attempt to destabilize the nation's energy system" and called the plan "flatly unconstitutional." Cruz, who says that he is an advocate for "volunteer conservation," and also disagreed with efforts by the EPA to expand regulatory oversight on water, which Cruz characterized an attempt "to turn irrigation ditches into lakes and rivers and oceans."

Cruz is a supporter of TransCanada's controversial Keystone XL Pipeline, and along with every other Republican senator was a cosponsor of legislation in support of the pipeline. Like most Republican senators, Cruz supports opening areas for offshore drilling. Cruz favors "expanding energy development on federal land" and has "pushed for preventing federal restrictions on fracking." In July 2015, Cruz's super PAC, "Keep the Promise," disclosed that the billionaire brothers Dan and Farris Wilks, who earned a fortune in the West Texas fracking boom, contributed a record-setting $15 million to the super PAC.

Cruz has offered amendments seeking to lift ban on U.S. crude oil exports and to expedite approval of export permits for liquid natural gas, issues which divide Republicans."

Cruz supported the U. S. withdrawal from the Paris Agreement.

Cruz's views on climate change attracted criticism from Democratic Governor Jerry Brown of California, who said in March 2015 that "That man betokens such a level of ignorance and a direct falsification of the existing scientific data. It's shocking, and I think that man has rendered himself absolutely unfit to be running for office." Cruz has a lifetime score of 3% on the National Environmental Scorecard of the League of Conservation Voters. Cruz has been described as a "climate change denier" by Vice Media.

=== Water ===
Cruz voted against the Water Resources Development Act of 2013, that would have created the National Endowment for the Oceans and authorize more than $26 billion in projects to be built by the Army Corps of Engineers, at least $16 billion of which would have come from federal taxpayers. Cruz voted against the bill because it neglected "to reduce a substantial backlog of projects, to the detriment of projects with national implications, such as the Sabine-Neches Waterway". Cruz stated that the Corps' responsibilities were expanded without providing adequate measures for state participation. Proponents of the bill argued that it would provide steady funding to support research and restoration projects, funded primarily by dedicating 12.5% of revenues from offshore energy development, including oil, gas, and renewable energy, through offshore lease sales and production based royalty payments, distributed through a competitive grant program.

== Foreign policy views ==
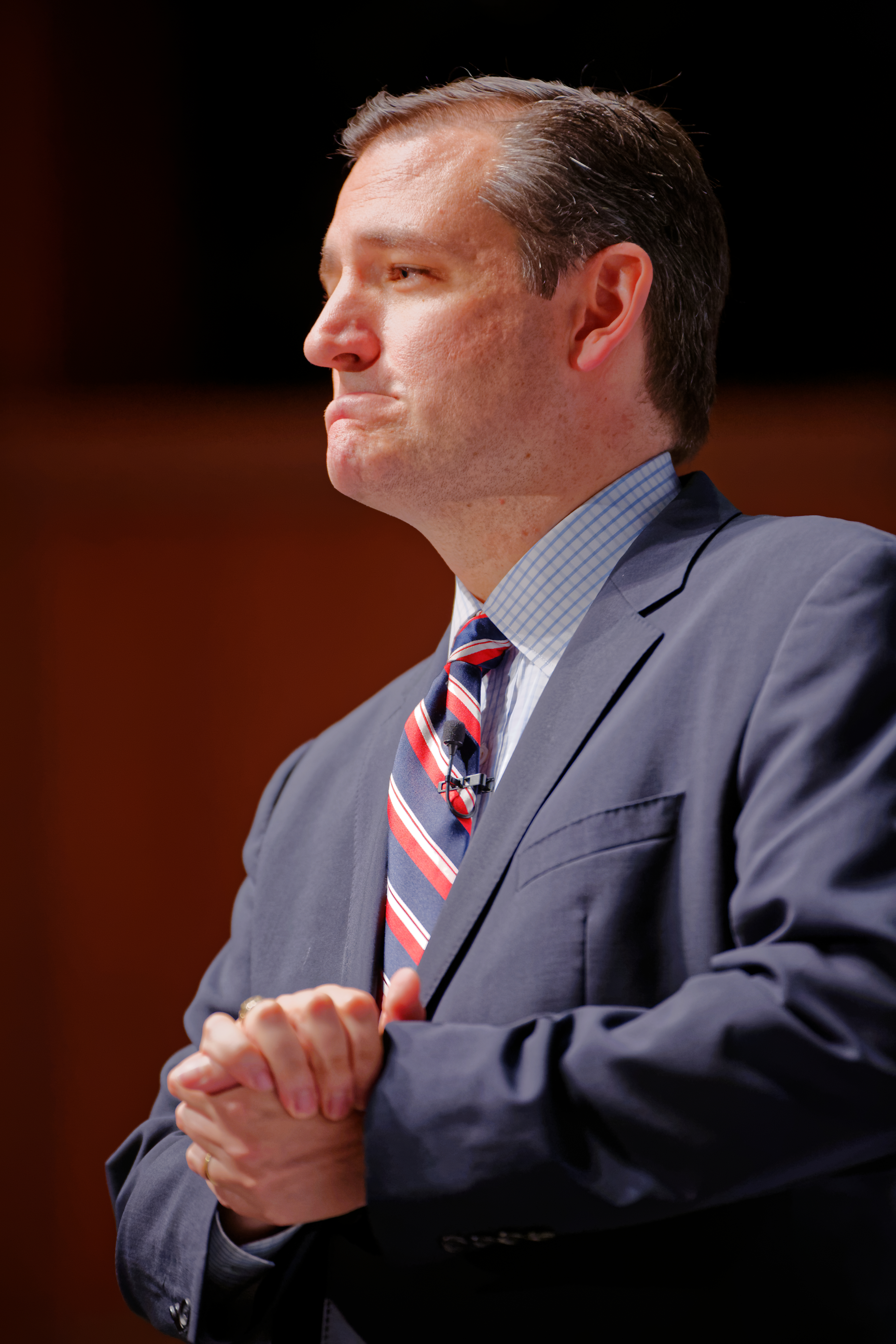
Cruz speaking at the May 2015 Citizens United Freedom Summit

On foreign policy, Cruz has said that on the scale of isolationist to interventionist he is "not somewhere in between but on a third point of a triangle" in which he analyzes America’s interests in a foreign matter before making a decision whether to be involved.

In 2004, Cruz accused Democratic presidential candidate John Kerry of being "against defending American values, against standing up to our enemies, and, in effect, for appeasing totalitarian despots."

Cruz helped defeat efforts to ratify the Convention on the Rights of Persons with Disabilities, arguing that the treaty infringed on U.S. sovereignty.

=== China ===
On October 4, 2019, Houston Rockets general manager Daryl Morey issued a tweet that supported 2019–2020 Hong Kong protests. On October 6, Morey and the NBA each issued a separate statement addressing the original tweet; Morey said that he never intended his tweet to cause any offense while the NBA said the tweet was "Regrettable". The statements drew attention and subsequent bipartisan criticism from several US politicians. Cruz tweeted "We’re better than this; human rights shouldn’t be for sale & the NBA shouldn’t be assisting Chinese communist censorship".

Senator Cruz has sharply criticized the Chinese government for the wrongful detention of Houston, Texas resident Mark Swidan who has been held for over ten years. The United Nations and U.S. Government consider Swidan to be wrongfully detained.

=== Cuba ===
Cruz is a critic of the rapprochement between Cuba and the United States, saying on Fox News in December 2014 that the thaw in relations was a "manifestation of the failures of the Obama-Clinton-Kerry foreign policy" that "will be remembered as a tragic mistake." In July 2015, Cruz said that President Obama's decision to establish an embassy in Havana but not in Jerusalem was a "slap in the face to Israel."

=== Iran ===
Cruz has been an adamant opponent of the Joint Comprehensive Plan of Action, a 2015 international nuclear agreement with Iran negotiated by the U.S. and other world powers, calling it "catastrophic" and "disastrous." Cruz had previously attempted, without success, to amend the Iran Nuclear Agreement Review Act of 2015 to require affirmative congressional approval of any agreement with Iran before sanctions relief can occur. Cruz asserted in May 2015 that the deal jeopardizes the lives of "millions of Americans" and "makes war a certainty." In September 2015, Cruz said that the Iran agreement "trusts the Iranians to inspect themselves" and that the agreement would "facilitate and accelerate" Iran acquiring a nuclear weapon, though Politifact found the statements misleading. Also in September 2015, Cruz was one of several Republicans to speak at an anti-Iran rally on the West Lawn of the Capitol sponsored by the Tea Party Patriots against the agreement.

In July 2017, Cruz voted in favor of the Countering America's Adversaries Through Sanctions Act that grouped together sanctions against Iran, Russia and North Korea.

In June 2025, during the Twelve-Day War, Cruz told Fox News: "I think it is very much in the interest of America to see regime change", and that there is "no redeeming the Ayatollah". In an interview with Tucker Carlson, he said that Iran had tried to assassinate Donald Trump, and that a Bible phrase saying that those who "bless Israel" will be blessed justifies supporting Israel's attacks on Iran. Cruz was unable to quote the passage or name its location when pressed by Carlson. Carlson criticized Cruz for not knowing the population of Iran, telling him: "You don't know anything about the country whose government you want to overthrow". Cruz initially told Carlson, "We are carrying out military strikes today", before appearing to correct himself: "Israel is leading them, but we're supporting them." He accused Carlson of having a "weird [...] obsession with Israel", which Carlson took as an allegation of antisemitism.

=== Israel ===
Cruz said in 2025 that he first ran for Senate in 2012 "with the stated intention of being the leading defender of Israel in the United States Senate". According to Cruz "those who hate Israel hate America", and in reference to Genesis 12:3, Cruz has said: "Biblically, we are commanded to support Israel". In 2014, he declared before the Zionist Organization of America that "standing for Israel is a deep passion of mine".

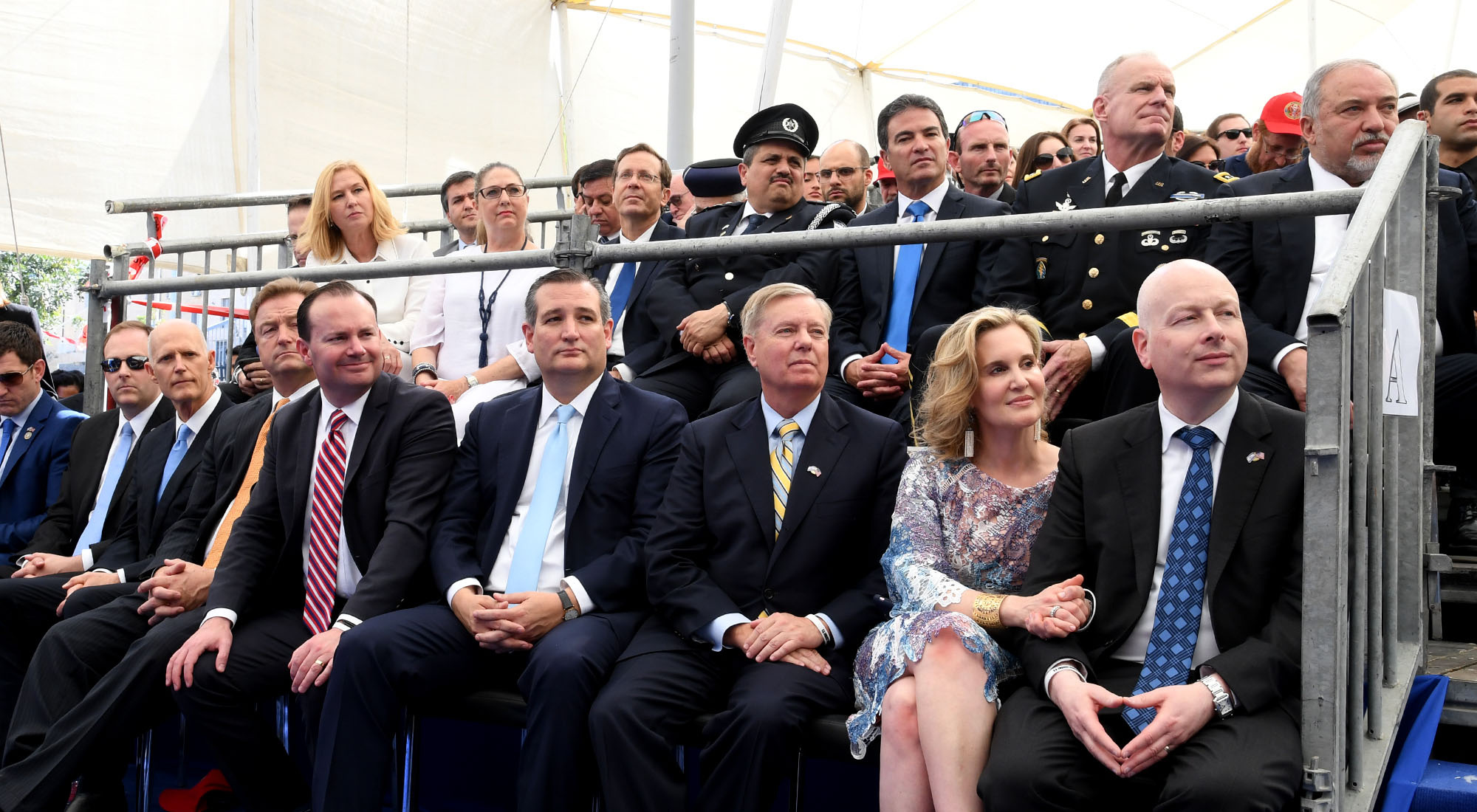
Cruz attended the opening of the US Embassy to Israel in Jerusalem in May 2018.

In May 2017, Cruz delivered a Senate floor speech in commemoration of the reunification of Jerusalem and said, "It is long past time that America does something it should have done two decades ago: move the American embassy to Jerusalem and formally recognize Jerusalem as Israel's eternal and undivided capital."

In June 2017, Cruz co-sponsored the Israel Anti-Boycott Act (s. 720), which would have made it a federal crime, punishable by a maximum sentence of 20 years imprisonment, for Americans to encourage or participate in boycotts against Israel and Israeli settlements in the occupied Palestinian territories if protesting actions by the Israeli government.

In December 2017, after President Trump announced the United States was recognizing Jerusalem as the capital of Israel, Cruz released a statement praising the move as recognizing "the reality that Jerusalem is the capital of Israel, and sends a powerful message that rejects all those who wrongly seek to delegitimize Israel through falsifying and erasing the profound ties that exist between the Jewish people and Jerusalem."

=== Syria ===
Cruz has said that he wants to "utterly destroy ISIS" and "carpet bomb" terrorists into oblivion. Otherwise, he opposes intervention in the Syrian Civil War. "If President Obama and Hillary Clinton and Sen. Rubio succeed in toppling (Syrian President Bashar) Assad, the result will be the radical Islamic terrorists will take over Syria, that Syria will be controlled by ISIS, and that is materially worse for U.S. national security interests", he said.

In 2013, Cruz stated that America had no "dog in the fight" during the Syrian Civil War and stated that America's armed forces should not serve as "al-Qaeda's air force". In 2014, Cruz criticized the Obama administration: "The president's foreign policy team utterly missed the threat of ISIS, indeed, was working to arm Syrian rebels that were fighting side by side with ISIS", calling ISIS "the face of evil". Cruz has called for bombing ISIS, but is doubtful that the United States "can tell the good guys from the bad guys" in a plan to arm "moderate" rebels, and the plan to defeat ISIS should not be "laden with impractical contingencies, such as resolving the Syrian civil war."

=== Agenda 21 ===
In 2012 the Republican Party platform included opposition to Agenda 21, a UN action plan intended to promote sustainable development. In early 2015 creative director Matt Berman suggested that Cruz had "waded into a big conspiracy theory" in a 2012 blog post on his website in which he warned against the United Nations Agenda 21, which he said "attempts to abolish" things like "golf courses, grazing pastures, and paved roads." Cruz said that George Soros was "the originator of this grand scheme" and wrote that "in the U.S. Senate, I intend to continue leading the fight, to stop Agenda 21 and any other globalist plan that tries to subvert the U.S. Constitution."

=== Christians in the Middle East ===
In 2014, Cruz spoke at an event held by the group In Defense of Christians (IDC). He was booed by the group after making statements considered pro-Israel. Cruz left the stage after telling the audience, "Those who hate Israel hate America. Those who hate Jews hate Christians. If those in this room will not recognize that, then my heart weeps. If you hate the Jewish people you are not reflecting the teachings of Christ. And the very same people who persecute and murder Christians right now, who crucify Christians, who behead children, are the very same people who target Jews for their faith, for the same reason". Some commentators believe there is a divide in the conservative movement between those who sided with Cruz and Israel, and those who sided with Middle Eastern Christians and some arguing that Cruz's comments were out-of-bounds. Others who criticized Cruz included Mollie Hemingway and Ross Douthat.
