= 2016 Indiana Republican presidential primary =

- May 3, 2016

57 pledged delegates to the Republican National Convention
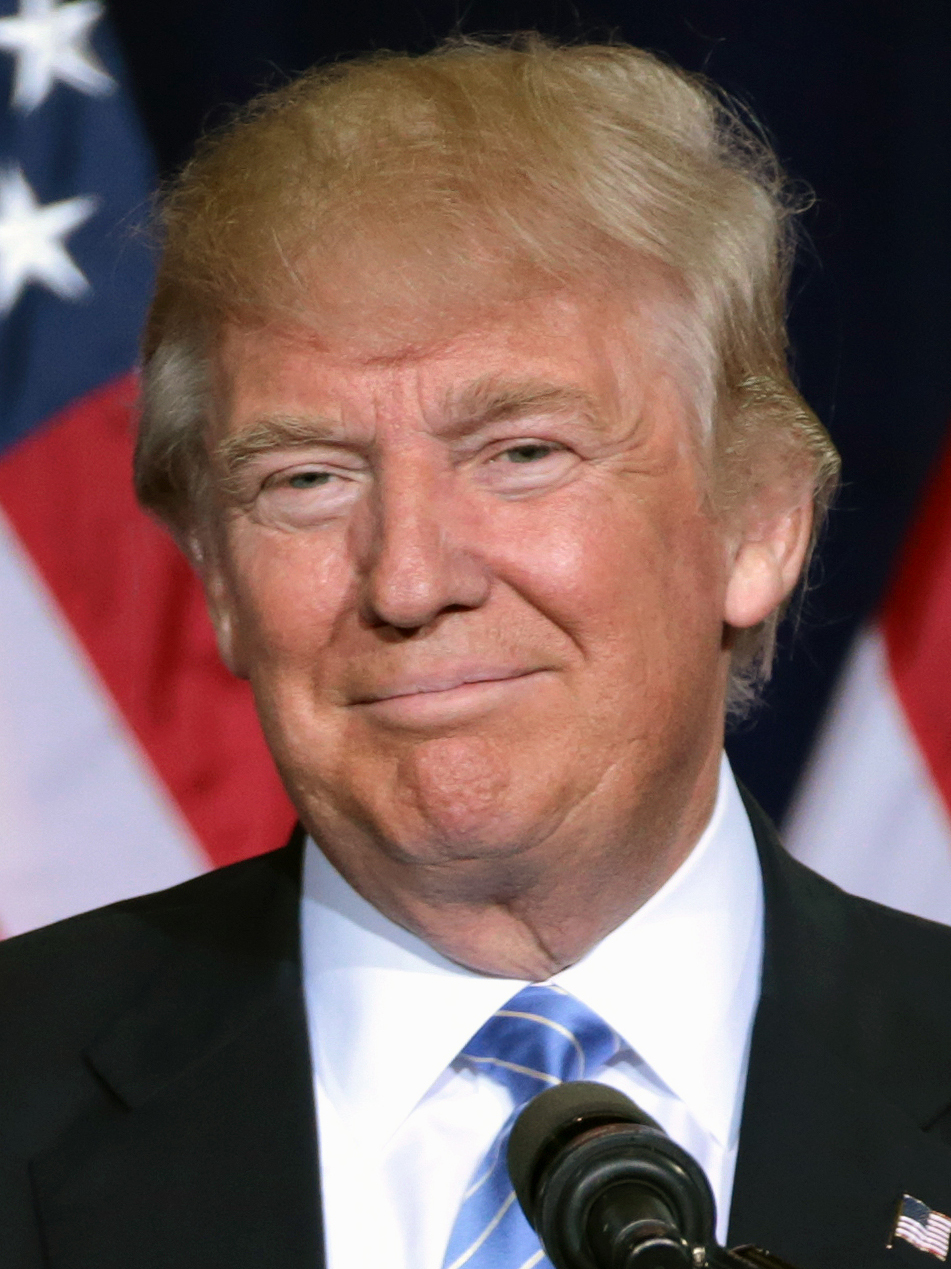

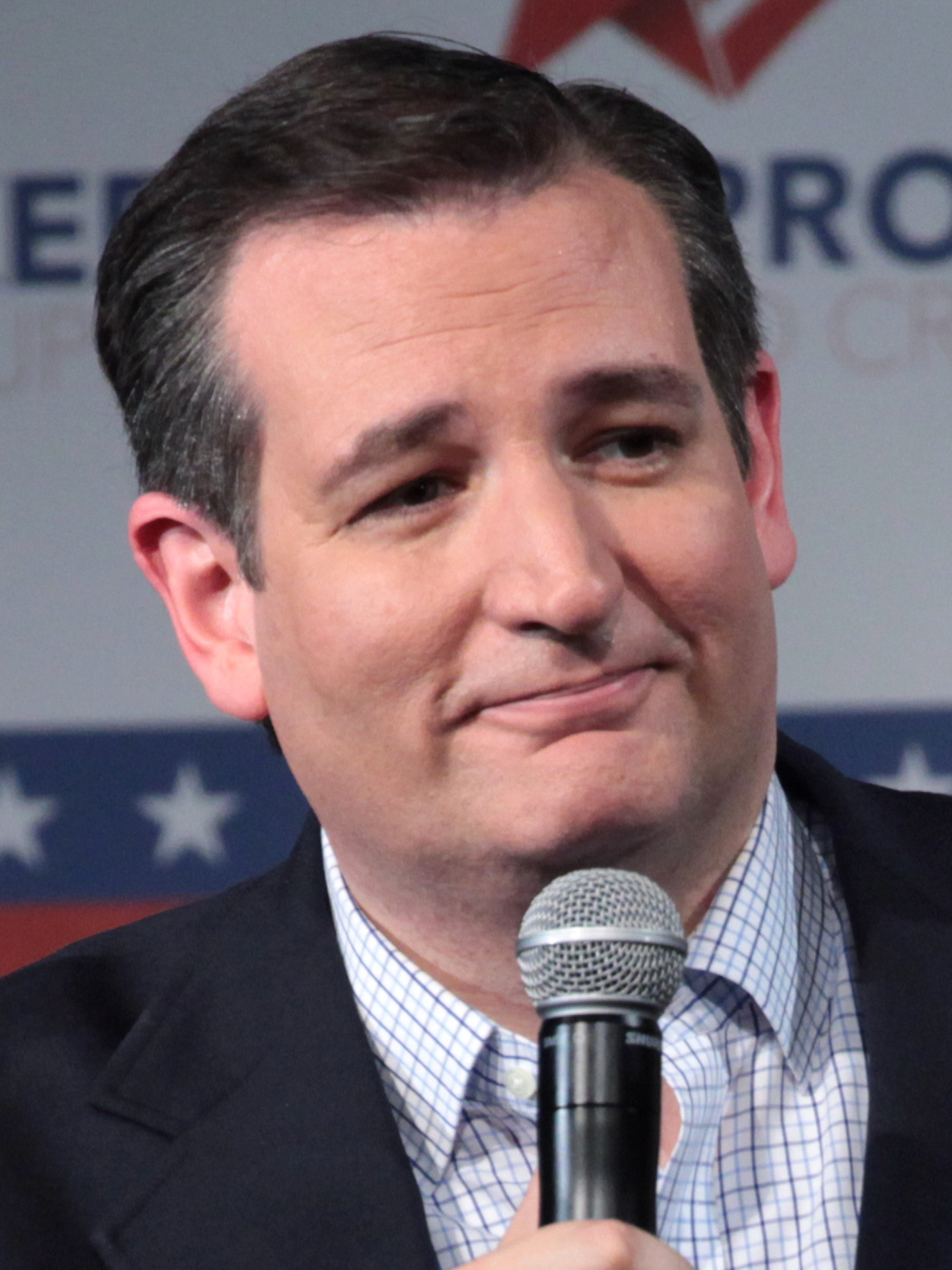

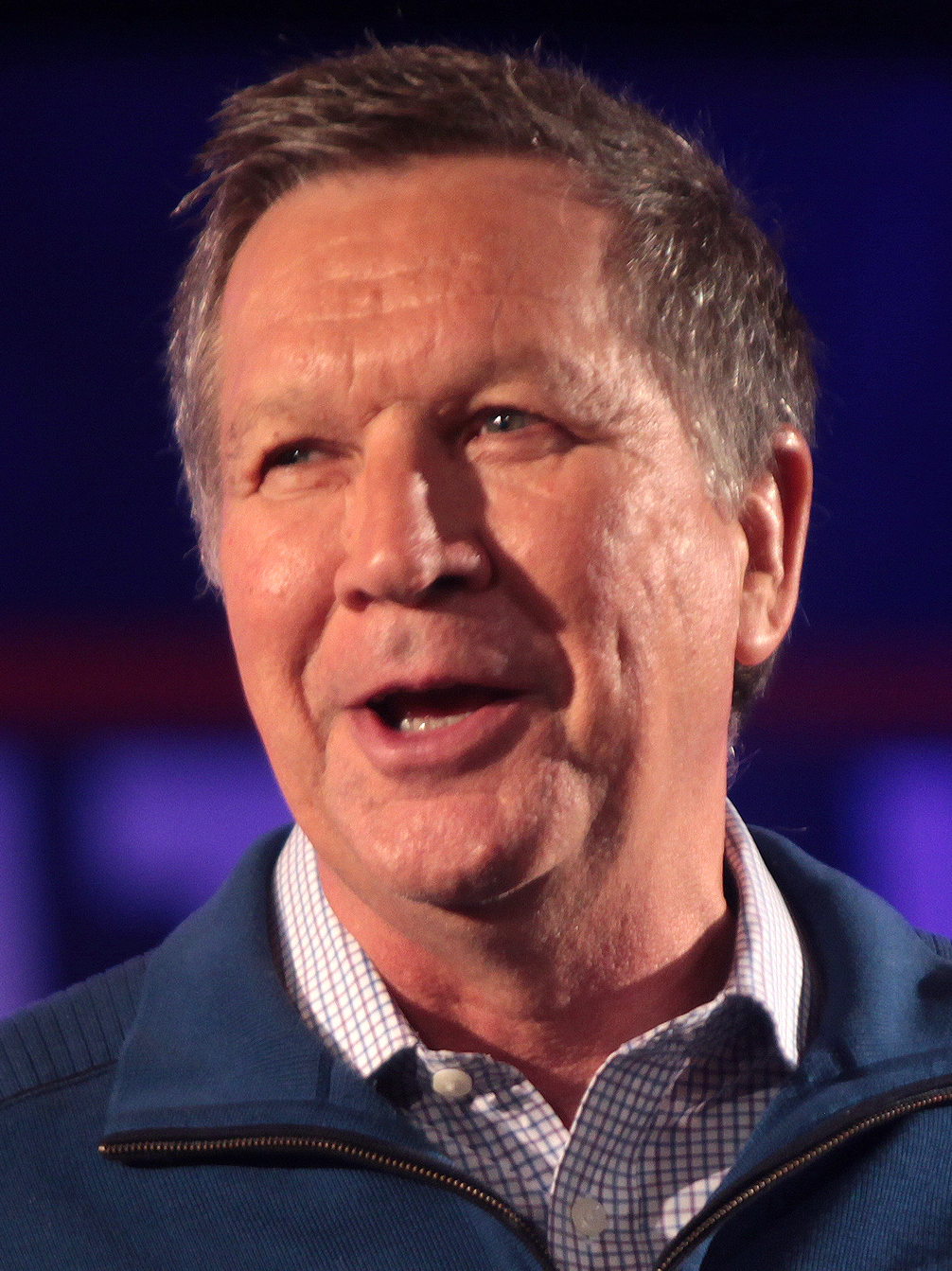
Candidate	Donald Trump	Ted Cruz	John Kasich
Home state	New York	Texas	Ohio
Delegate count	57	0	0
Popular vote	591,514	406,783	84,111
Percentage	53.26%	36.63%	7.57%
Results by county
Donald Trump 40–50% 50–60% 60–70%	Ted Cruz 40–50% 50–60%

The 2016 Indiana Republican presidential primary was held on May 3 in the U.S. state of Indiana as one of the Republican Party's primaries ahead of the 2016 presidential election. This was a winner-take-all election, so Donald Trump, who came in first in the popular vote, won all the delegates.

The Democratic Party held their own Indiana primary on the same day, which was won by Bernie Sanders. Other primaries were not scheduled for that day.

Following Trump's win, both Cruz and Kasich suspended their campaigns and Trump was declared the presumptive GOP nominee.

== Primary ==
=== Pre-primary strategies ===
By late April, Cruz and Kasich had both been eliminated from getting 1,237 delegates, but they still had a chance to accumulate enough delegates to force a contested convention in Cleveland. Realizing this, Cruz and Kasich attempted to focus their efforts in different states, with Cruz challenging Trump head-to-head in Indiana and Kasich challenging Trump head-to-head in Oregon and New Mexico. However, the alliance was tenuous at best, with Kasich telling voters in Indiana the next day to still vote for him and Cruz downplaying the alliance later in the week; it also met with disapproval from 58% of Indiana voters.

=== Final attempts to stop Trump ===
Indiana was seen as the final state for the "Stop Trump" movement. Indiana, whose delegates were awarded winner-take all statewide and by congressional district, was seen as essential to denying Trump the 1,237 delegates needed to secure the nomination. Following the Acela primaries, Cruz attempted to bolster his chances by announcing that, if nominated, he would name Fiorina as his running mate. Fiorina had served as a Cruz campaign surrogate since March after suspending her own presidential campaign in February and Cruz hoped that Fiorina could help his campaign in Indiana and her home state of California. On April 29, 2016, Governor Mike Pence of Indiana, who eventually became Donald Trump's running mate, announced that he would vote for Cruz in the primary election. However, Cruz's posturing and endorsements proved to be insufficient, as Trump handily won Indiana with 53% of the vote, despite being outspent by a margin of more than 4–1. Cruz lost Indiana by a wide margin to Trump (53% to 37% with Kasich at 8%) and subsequently dropped out of the race.

== Trump emerges as Republican nominee ==
Cruz lost Indiana by a wide margin to Trump (53% to 37% with Kasich at 8%) and subsequently dropped out of the race. As a result, Reince Priebus, Republican National Committee chairman, tweeted that Trump was the presumptive nominee in the GOP. The next day, Kasich also suspended his campaign, leaving Trump as the only candidate in the race. Despite his endorsement of Cruz, Mike Pence went on to become Trump's running mate.

== Opinion polling ==
List of polls
Main article: United States presidential election in Indiana, 2016

Winner: Donald Trump
Primary date: May 3, 2016

Poll source	Date	1st	2nd	3rd	Other
Primary results	May 3, 2016	Donald Trump; 53.25%	Ted Cruz; 36.64%	John Kasich; 7.57%	Ben Carson 0.80%, Jeb Bush 0.59%, Marco Rubio 0.47%, Rand Paul 0.39%, Chris Christie 0.16%, Carly Fiorina 0.13%
Gravis Marketing Margin of error: ± 5.0% Sample size: 379	April 28–29, 2016	Donald Trump; 44%	Ted Cruz; 27%	John Kasich; 9%	Undecided 19%
ARG Margin of error: ± 4.0% Sample size: 400	April 27–28, 2016	Donald Trump; 41%	Ted Cruz; 32%	John Kasich; 21%	Undecided 6%
NBC News/Wall Street Journal/Marist Margin of error: ± 3.9% Sample size: 645	April 26–28, 2016	Donald Trump; 49%	Ted Cruz; 34%	John Kasich; 13%	Undecided 4%
IPFW Margin of error: ± 4.9% Sample size: 400	April 13–27, 2016	Ted Cruz; 45%	Donald Trump; 29%	John Kasich; 13%	Undecided 13%
Clout Research Margin of error: ±4.75% Sample size: 423	April 27, 2016	Donald Trump 37.1%	Ted Cruz; 35.2%	John Kasich; 16.3%	Undecided 11.4%
CBS News/YouGov Margin of error: ± 6.6% Sample size: 548	April 20–22, 2016	Donald Trump 40%	Ted Cruz; 35%	John Kasich; 20%	Undecided 5%
Fox News Margin of error: ± 4% Sample size: 602	April 18–21, 2016	Donald Trump; 41%	Ted Cruz; 33%	John Kasich; 16%	Undecided 7%, None 2%
POS/Howey Politics Indiana/WTHR Channel Margin of error: ± 4.3% Sample size: 507	April 18–21, 2016	Donald Trump; 37%	Ted Cruz; 31%	John Kasich; 22%	Undecided 7%, Other 2%
Bellwether Margin of error: ± 3.5% Sample size: 670	December 2–9, 2015	Donald Trump; 26%	Ted Cruz; 17%	Marco Rubio; 17%	Ben Carson 16%, Jeb Bush 6%, Rand Paul 5%, Chris Christie 3%, Carly Fiorina 3%, Rick Santorum 1%, Mike Huckabee 1%, John Kasich 1%

== Results ==
Trump won Indiana by a considerable margin statewide. He won nearly all regions of the state except for five counties in northeast Indiana containing the Fort Wayne and Elkhart areas, which Cruz won.

Indiana Republican primary, May 3, 2016
Candidate	Votes	Percentage	Actual delegate count		
Candidate	Votes	Percentage	Bound	Unbound	Total
Donald Trump	591,514	53.26%	57	0	57
Ted Cruz	406,783	36.63%	0	0	0
John Kasich	84,111	7.57%	0	0	0
Ben Carson (withdrawn)	8,914	0.80%	0	0	0
Jeb Bush (withdrawn)	6,508	0.59%	0	0	0
Marco Rubio (withdrawn)	5,175	0.47%	0	0	0
Rand Paul (withdrawn)	4,306	0.39%	0	0	0
Chris Christie (withdrawn)	1,738	0.16%	0	0	0
Carly Fiorina (withdrawn)	1,494	0.13%	0	0	0
Unprojected delegates:			0	0	0
Total:	1,110,543	100.00%	57	0	57
Source: The Green Papers

=== By county ===
County	Donald Trump		Ted Cruz		John Kasich		Ben Carson		Jeb Bush		Marco Rubio		Rand Paul		Chris Christie		Carly Fiorina		Margin		Total
County	Votes	%	Votes	%	Votes	%	Votes	%	Votes	%	Votes	%	Votes	%	Votes	%	Votes	%	Votes	%	Total
Adams	2,458	35.80%	3,851	56.09%	367	5.35%	90	1.31%	35	0.51%	20	0.29%	28	0.41%	11	0.16%	6	0.09%	-1,393	-20.29%	6,866
Allen	29,495	44.72%	29,994	45.48%	4,880	7.40%	569	0.86%	289	0.44%	327	0.50%	239	0.36%	96	0.15%	60	0.09%	-499	-0.76%	65,949
Bartholomew	7,918	48.86%	6,284	38.78%	1,451	8.95%	164	1.01%	141	0.87%	92	0.57%	94	0.58%	30	0.19%	30	0.19%	1,634	10.08%	16,204
Benton	1,175	54.65%	720	33.49%	171	7.95%	28	1.30%	21	0.98%	16	0.74%	10	0.47%	7	0.33%	2	0.09%	455	21.16%	2,150
Blackford	1,019	51.78%	800	40.65%	101	5.13%	17	0.86%	13	0.66%	6	0.30%	8	0.41%	3	0.15%	1	0.05%	219	11.13%	1,968
Boone	7,023	45.74%	6,223	40.53%	1,728	11.25%	101	0.66%	93	0.61%	82	0.53%	65	0.42%	15	0.10%	24	0.16%	800	5.21%	15,354
Brown	2,202	56.66%	1,387	35.69%	189	4.86%	33	0.85%	29	0.75%	16	0.41%	15	0.39%	6	0.15%	9	0.23%	815	20.97%	3,886
Carroll	2,423	52.66%	1,737	37.75%	302	6.56%	37	0.80%	31	0.67%	19	0.41%	25	0.54%	18	0.39%	9	0.20%	686	14.91%	4,601
Cass	3,941	56.89%	2,362	34.09%	411	5.93%	67	0.97%	59	0.85%	44	0.64%	24	0.35%	11	0.16%	9	0.13%	1,579	22.79%	6,928
Clark	10,639	59.47%	5,853	32.71%	901	5.04%	140	0.78%	96	0.54%	117	0.65%	94	0.53%	33	0.18%	18	0.10%	4,786	26.75%	17,891
Clay	3,615	62.80%	1,788	31.06%	212	3.68%	38	0.66%	47	0.82%	21	0.36%	17	0.30%	8	0.14%	10	0.17%	1,827	31.74%	5,756
Clinton	3,252	49.17%	2,637	39.87%	474	7.17%	81	1.22%	73	1.10%	39	0.59%	28	0.42%	17	0.26%	13	0.20%	615	9.30%	6,614
Crawford	1,162	60.18%	634	32.83%	56	2.90%	17	0.88%	22	1.14%	12	0.62%	16	0.83%	9	0.47%	3	0.16%	528	27.34%	1,931
Daviess	3,894	60.70%	1,920	29.93%	393	6.13%	69	1.08%	57	0.89%	34	0.53%	22	0.34%	17	0.27%	9	0.14%	1,974	30.77%	6,415
Dearborn	6,618	64.47%	2,376	23.15%	1,086	10.58%	47	0.46%	29	0.28%	33	0.32%	54	0.53%	17	0.17%	5	0.05%	4,242	41.32%	10,265
Decatur	3,319	56.46%	2,078	35.35%	345	5.87%	47	0.80%	41	0.70%	27	0.46%	7	0.12%	9	0.15%	6	0.10%	1,241	21.11%	5,879
DeKalb	4,204	47.65%	3,748	42.48%	624	7.07%	92	1.04%	55	0.62%	37	0.42%	27	0.31%	17	0.19%	18	0.20%	456	5.17%	8,822
Delaware	8,795	52.83%	6,154	36.97%	1,255	7.54%	147	0.88%	113	0.68%	75	0.45%	55	0.33%	26	0.16%	28	0.17%	2,641	15.86%	16,648
Dubois	4,692	58.50%	2,475	30.86%	651	8.12%	72	0.90%	45	0.56%	37	0.46%	27	0.34%	11	0.14%	11	0.14%	2,217	27.64%	8,021
Elkhart	14,467	42.58%	16,211	47.71%	2,446	7.20%	278	0.82%	194	0.57%	165	0.49%	110	0.32%	60	0.18%	47	0.14%	-1,744	-5.13%	33,978
Fayette	2,744	66.15%	1,056	25.46%	245	5.91%	33	0.80%	28	0.68%	14	0.34%	15	0.36%	8	0.19%	5	0.12%	1,688	40.69%	4,148
Floyd	7,458	55.67%	4,499	33.58%	1,046	7.81%	91	0.68%	74	0.55%	107	0.80%	80	0.60%	22	0.16%	19	0.14%	2,959	22.09%	13,396
Fountain	2,742	61.48%	1,301	29.17%	234	5.25%	66	1.48%	44	0.99%	16	0.36%	39	0.87%	11	0.25%	7	0.16%	1,441	32.31%	4,460
Franklin	3,488	64.13%	1,326	24.38%	524	9.63%	28	0.51%	18	0.33%	16	0.29%	22	0.40%	5	0.09%	12	0.22%	2,162	39.75%	5,439
Fulton	2,556	58.21%	1,433	32.63%	280	6.38%	38	0.87%	30	0.68%	18	0.41%	20	0.46%	10	0.23%	6	0.14%	1,123	25.58%	4,391
Gibson	4,238	60.15%	2,263	32.12%	369	5.24%	77	1.09%	42	0.60%	25	0.35%	21	0.30%	8	0.11%	3	0.04%	1,975	28.03%	7,046
Grant	5,992	47.03%	5,653	44.37%	739	5.80%	141	1.11%	97	0.76%	46	0.36%	36	0.28%	23	0.18%	14	0.11%	339	2.66%	12,741
Greene	4,491	64.59%	1,971	28.35%	302	4.34%	71	1.02%	53	0.76%	27	0.39%	24	0.35%	7	0.10%	7	0.10%	2,520	36.24%	6,953
Hamilton	35,034	46.20%	29,409	38.78%	9,598	12.66%	435	0.57%	396	0.52%	420	0.55%	297	0.39%	118	0.16%	131	0.17%	5,625	7.42%	75,838
Hancock	9,541	53.77%	6,581	37.09%	1,244	7.01%	105	0.59%	89	0.50%	68	0.38%	72	0.41%	23	0.13%	21	0.12%	2,960	16.68%	17,744
Harrison	4,482	58.07%	2,585	33.49%	425	5.51%	84	1.09%	55	0.71%	31	0.40%	36	0.47%	14	0.18%	6	0.08%	1,897	24.58%	7,718
Hendricks	18,555	49.88%	14,876	39.99%	2,869	7.71%	290	0.78%	193	0.52%	175	0.47%	125	0.34%	62	0.17%	51	0.14%	3,679	9.89%	37,196
Henry	5,714	58.41%	3,362	34.37%	453	4.63%	78	0.80%	67	0.68%	36	0.37%	40	0.41%	14	0.14%	19	0.19%	2,352	24.04%	9,783
Howard	8,475	54.08%	5,946	37.95%	833	5.32%	150	0.96%	104	0.66%	63	0.40%	59	0.38%	17	0.11%	23	0.15%	2,529	16.14%	15,670
Huntington	4,100	47.80%	3,658	42.64%	547	6.38%	111	1.29%	63	0.73%	51	0.59%	21	0.24%	15	0.17%	12	0.14%	442	5.15%	8,578
Jackson	5,362	60.59%	2,647	29.91%	517	5.84%	108	1.22%	84	0.95%	55	0.62%	50	0.57%	17	0.19%	9	0.10%	2,715	30.68%	8,849
Jasper	3,903	57.91%	2,120	31.45%	494	7.33%	68	1.01%	64	0.95%	36	0.53%	36	0.53%	16	0.24%	3	0.04%	1,783	26.45%	6,740
Jay	2,194	53.66%	1,475	36.07%	289	7.07%	47	1.15%	40	0.98%	14	0.34%	13	0.32%	12	0.29%	5	0.12%	719	17.58%	4,089
Jefferson	3,078	59.42%	1,584	30.58%	367	7.08%	46	0.89%	41	0.79%	26	0.50%	27	0.52%	4	0.08%	7	0.14%	1,494	28.84%	5,180
Jennings	3,363	64.65%	1,470	28.26%	221	4.25%	56	1.08%	38	0.73%	22	0.42%	19	0.37%	5	0.10%	8	0.15%	1,893	36.39%	5,202
Johnson	17,218	53.87%	11,849	37.07%	2,199	6.88%	215	0.67%	158	0.49%	136	0.43%	92	0.29%	45	0.14%	48	0.15%	5,369	16.80%	31,960
Knox	4,918	66.68%	1,929	26.15%	344	4.66%	74	1.00%	50	0.68%	31	0.42%	18	0.24%	5	0.07%	7	0.09%	2,989	40.52%	7,376
Kosciusko	8,750	48.48%	7,702	42.68%	1,128	6.25%	176	0.98%	114	0.63%	59	0.33%	84	0.47%	19	0.11%	15	0.08%	1,048	5.81%	18,047
LaGrange	2,571	47.01%	2,373	43.39%	368	6.73%	51	0.93%	39	0.71%	24	0.44%	23	0.42%	10	0.18%	10	0.18%	198	3.62%	5,469
Lake	28,620	64.21%	12,098	27.14%	2,981	6.69%	280	0.63%	127	0.28%	189	0.42%	166	0.37%	65	0.15%	48	0.11%	16,522	37.07%	44,574
LaPorte	9,501	62.53%	4,434	29.18%	925	6.09%	101	0.66%	77	0.51%	62	0.41%	61	0.40%	22	0.14%	11	0.07%	5,067	33.35%	15,194
Lawrence	5,971	60.08%	3,132	31.52%	507	5.10%	107	1.08%	80	0.80%	50	0.50%	62	0.62%	13	0.13%	16	0.16%	2,839	28.57%	9,938
Madison	12,487	56.05%	8,023	36.01%	1,156	5.19%	213	0.96%	144	0.65%	111	0.50%	66	0.30%	36	0.16%	41	0.18%	4,464	20.04%	22,277
Marion	49,843	49.10%	39,562	38.97%	9,633	9.49%	699	0.69%	547	0.54%	503	0.50%	396	0.39%	169	0.17%	164	0.16%	10,281	10.13%	101,516
Marshall	4,755	51.47%	3,644	39.44%	563	6.09%	89	0.96%	74	0.80%	47	0.51%	39	0.42%	18	0.19%	10	0.11%	1,111	12.03%	9,239
Martin	1,398	61.45%	744	32.70%	80	3.52%	14	0.62%	17	0.75%	7	0.31%	7	0.31%	6	0.26%	2	0.09%	654	28.75%	2,275
Miami	3,286	53.17%	2,409	38.98%	316	5.11%	59	0.95%	43	0.70%	22	0.36%	31	0.50%	8	0.13%	6	0.10%	877	14.19%	6,180
Monroe	7,259	48.87%	5,505	37.06%	1,683	11.33%	115	0.77%	98	0.66%	90	0.61%	70	0.47%	15	0.10%	19	0.13%	1,754	11.81%	14,854
Montgomery	4,412	53.54%	2,912	35.34%	632	7.67%	81	0.98%	55	0.67%	60	0.73%	46	0.56%	24	0.29%	19	0.23%	1,500	18.20%	8,241
Morgan	10,236	58.54%	5,885	33.66%	941	5.38%	155	0.89%	102	0.58%	72	0.41%	51	0.29%	22	0.13%	20	0.11%	4,351	24.89%	17,484
Newton	1,814	64.01%	725	25.58%	206	7.27%	26	0.92%	25	0.88%	14	0.49%	9	0.32%	4	0.14%	11	0.39%	1,089	38.43%	2,834
Noble	4,422	49.33%	3,706	41.34%	578	6.45%	95	1.06%	71	0.79%	52	0.58%	21	0.23%	12	0.13%	7	0.08%	716	7.99%	8,964
Ohio	786	65.55%	299	24.94%	91	7.59%	7	0.58%	4	0.33%	6	0.50%	2	0.17%	2	0.17%	2	0.17%	487	40.62%	1,199
Orange	2,574	60.51%	1,223	28.75%	248	5.83%	65	1.53%	61	1.43%	33	0.78%	27	0.63%	15	0.35%	8	0.19%	1,351	31.76%	4,254
Owen	2,679	64.29%	1,217	29.21%	165	3.96%	39	0.94%	26	0.62%	16	0.38%	17	0.41%	2	0.05%	6	0.14%	1,462	35.09%	4,167
Parke	2,371	63.41%	1,059	28.32%	199	5.32%	41	1.10%	33	0.88%	12	0.32%	9	0.24%	11	0.29%	4	0.11%	1,312	35.09%	3,739
Perry	1,642	66.05%	607	24.42%	166	6.68%	14	0.56%	25	1.01%	12	0.48%	13	0.52%	5	0.20%	2	0.08%	1,035	41.63%	2,486
Pike	1,649	62.09%	821	30.91%	122	4.59%	29	1.09%	11	0.41%	13	0.49%	7	0.26%	4	0.15%	0	0.00%	828	31.17%	2,656
Porter	16,206	61.76%	7,082	26.99%	2,362	9.00%	150	0.57%	131	0.50%	126	0.48%	118	0.45%	38	0.14%	26	0.10%	9,124	34.77%	26,239
Posey	3,159	59.76%	1,696	32.08%	322	6.09%	35	0.66%	23	0.44%	18	0.34%	22	0.42%	2	0.04%	9	0.17%	1,463	27.68%	5,286
Pulaski	1,668	55.25%	1,042	34.51%	192	6.36%	32	1.06%	43	1.42%	14	0.46%	13	0.43%	10	0.33%	5	0.17%	626	20.74%	3,019
Putnam	4,087	56.05%	2,737	37.53%	309	4.24%	48	0.66%	41	0.56%	19	0.26%	26	0.36%	7	0.10%	18	0.25%	1,350	18.51%	7,292
Randolph	2,939	55.58%	1,840	34.80%	350	6.62%	49	0.93%	47	0.89%	13	0.25%	21	0.40%	19	0.36%	10	0.19%	1,099	20.78%	5,288
Ripley	4,055	62.00%	1,581	24.17%	745	11.39%	56	0.86%	26	0.40%	23	0.35%	31	0.47%	8	0.12%	15	0.23%	2,474	37.83%	6,540
Rush	2,362	56.20%	1,457	34.67%	255	6.07%	35	0.83%	38	0.90%	20	0.48%	17	0.40%	15	0.36%	4	0.10%	905	21.53%	4,203
Scott	1,929	65.06%	867	29.24%	100	3.37%	28	0.94%	5	0.17%	9	0.30%	23	0.78%	2	0.07%	2	0.07%	1,062	35.82%	2,965
Shelby	5,044	56.61%	3,190	35.80%	439	4.93%	69	0.77%	79	0.89%	26	0.29%	35	0.39%	10	0.11%	18	0.20%	1,854	20.81%	8,910
Spencer	2,350	56.85%	1,378	33.33%	292	7.06%	42	1.02%	24	0.58%	24	0.58%	16	0.39%	4	0.10%	4	0.10%	972	23.51%	4,134
St. Joseph	19,060	50.79%	15,241	40.61%	2,568	6.84%	192	0.51%	120	0.32%	137	0.37%	117	0.31%	52	0.14%	40	0.11%	3,819	10.18%	37,527
Starke	2,456	66.38%	1,072	28.97%	128	3.46%	6	0.16%	17	0.46%	6	0.16%	9	0.24%	3	0.08%	3	0.08%	1,384	37.41%	3,700
Steuben	3,973	54.51%	2,500	34.30%	614	8.42%	56	0.77%	54	0.74%	34	0.47%	31	0.43%	22	0.30%	5	0.07%	1,473	20.21%	7,289
Sullivan	2,379	68.30%	944	27.10%	115	3.30%	17	0.49%	15	0.43%	6	0.17%	5	0.14%	2	0.06%	0	0.00%	1,435	41.20%	3,483
Switzerland	858	66.10%	263	20.26%	137	10.55%	14	1.08%	7	0.54%	4	0.31%	9	0.69%	4	0.31%	2	0.15%	595	45.84%	1,298
Tippecanoe	10,306	44.56%	9,468	40.94%	2,706	11.70%	188	0.81%	145	0.63%	125	0.54%	115	0.50%	36	0.16%	39	0.17%	838	3.62%	23,128
Tipton	2,269	52.74%	1,631	37.91%	251	5.83%	46	1.07%	43	1.00%	34	0.79%	13	0.30%	9	0.21%	6	0.14%	638	14.83%	4,302
Union	875	59.28%	365	24.73%	203	13.75%	17	1.15%	8	0.54%	4	0.27%	1	0.07%	2	0.14%	1	0.07%	510	34.55%	1,476
Vanderburgh	14,549	54.71%	9,300	34.97%	2,170	8.16%	202	0.76%	121	0.46%	106	0.40%	74	0.28%	37	0.14%	33	0.12%	5,249	19.74%	26,592
Vermillion	1,748	69.86%	602	24.06%	92	3.68%	16	0.64%	14	0.56%	13	0.52%	10	0.40%	3	0.12%	4	0.16%	1,146	45.80%	2,502
Vigo	8,541	63.56%	3,830	28.50%	788	5.86%	82	0.61%	60	0.45%	65	0.48%	29	0.22%	20	0.15%	23	0.17%	4,711	35.06%	13,438
Wabash	3,932	52.00%	2,964	39.20%	450	5.95%	88	1.16%	51	0.67%	31	0.41%	27	0.36%	5	0.07%	13	0.17%	968	12.80%	7,561
Warren	1,321	63.45%	583	28.00%	114	5.48%	16	0.77%	18	0.86%	8	0.38%	15	0.72%	5	0.24%	2	0.10%	738	35.45%	2,082
Warrick	7,450	55.53%	4,721	35.19%	957	7.13%	118	0.88%	60	0.45%	51	0.38%	40	0.30%	10	0.07%	10	0.07%	2,729	20.34%	13,417
Washington	3,156	62.21%	1,542	30.40%	206	4.06%	59	1.16%	39	0.77%	18	0.35%	41	0.81%	7	0.14%	5	0.10%	1,614	31.82%	5,073
Wayne	6,118	59.25%	2,939	28.46%	1,023	9.91%	89	0.86%	71	0.69%	44	0.43%	20	0.19%	12	0.12%	9	0.09%	3,179	30.79%	10,325
Wells	2,777	39.12%	3,826	53.89%	349	4.92%	48	0.68%	39	0.55%	25	0.35%	27	0.38%	2	0.03%	6	0.08%	-1,049	-14.78%	7,099
White	3,045	57.19%	1,753	32.93%	394	7.40%	31	0.58%	42	0.79%	24	0.45%	17	0.32%	12	0.23%	6	0.11%	1,292	24.27%	5,324
Whitley	3,919	44.33%	4,064	45.97%	610	6.90%	83	0.94%	43	0.49%	42	0.48%	50	0.57%	16	0.18%	14	0.16%	-145	-1.64%	8,841
