= Kevin Swanson (pastor) =

American minister and anti-gay rights activist

Kevin Swanson is a preacher and broadcaster from Colorado, known for his condemnation of homosexuality as well as his advocacy of Christian education. He is the pastor of Reformation Church in Elizabeth, Colorado, which is a member church of the Covenant Presbyterian Church. He is the director of Generations, which produces Generations, a daily podcast hosted by Swanson. Swanson is also a writer for The World View in 5 Minutes, a daily online Christian newscast.

== Personal life ==
Swanson was born to missionaries, growing up in Japan in the 1960s and 1970s, and was educated by his parents. He attended and graduated from California Polytechnic State University with a degree in engineering. Swanson ran for governor of Colorado in the 1994 election as a candidate for the Taxpayers Party (now the Constitution Party), receiving 3.62% of the vote. He is married to Brenda Swanson, with whom he has five children.

== Views ==
Swanson hosted the Freedom 2015: National Religious Liberties Conference in Des Moines, Iowa, attended by Republican presidential candidates Senator Ted Cruz of Texas and his father Rafael Cruz, former Governor Mike Huckabee of Arkansas, and Governor Bobby Jindal of Louisiana. The conference addressed the issue of securing religious liberty for the future. At the conference, Swanson spoke about a Biblical mandate of the death penalty for homosexuality, stating that both the Old and New Testament cover the "sin of homosexuality" and that in Romans 1 Paul the Apostle affirms that it is worthy of capital punishment. In the same speech, he stated that he was not calling for these biblical injunctions to be enacted in America "because homosexuals need time to repent" and "America needs time to repent". Rather than read J.K. Rowling's Harry Potter books he urged "America, repent of Harry Potter. Repent that Dumbledore emerged as a homosexual mentor for Harry Potter." He said: "For tens of millions of parents, it would be better that a millstone be hung around their neck and they be drowned at the bottom of the sea." Ted Cruz's spokesman Rick Tyler called Swanson's statements "reprehensible" and given the comments "it was a mistake for Senator Cruz to appear at the event", stating that Cruz is against hatred or violence against homosexuals.

The existence of homosexuality is an explanation for terrorist incidents, according to Swanson. On his June 16, 2016 radio show, he said the Orlando nightclub shooting was caused because of general sinfulness, quoting a section of Romans 1 commonly cited to condemn homosexuality: "God gave them over to a reprobate mind." He then quoted Jesus' words in Matthew 15:19: "For out of the heart come evil thoughts, murder, adultery, sexual immorality, theft, false witness, slander", and concluded that "man has a heart problem". He also compared the incident to a mass killing mentioned in Luke 13, to which Jesus responded "unless you repent you will likewise perish". Swanson said that "humble homosexuals that fall on their faces and plead for God's mercy as the publican did in the parable will go to heaven" and "proud gays will go to hell". He believes the Borg (in the Star Trek franchise) has demonic power. In 2014, he said the Disney film Frozen (2013) was the work of the devil and persuades young women to be lesbians. Disney, he said, is "one of the most pro-homosexual organisations in the country".

Swanson claimed the November 2015 Paris attacks happened because "God's sending a message." He defended the 2014 Uganda Anti-Homosexuality Act, which introduced the punishment for homosexuality as life imprisonment or execution.

In June 2019, Swanson said of singer Taylor Swift's embrace of the LGBTQ community in one of her songs, "You Need to Calm Down", saying she is "apparently telling God to calm down about all of his ethical concerns. I don't think it's going to be effective, but that's what she's doing". He added: "I think we just tell Taylor Swift that she's a fool. That she doesn't fear God, and sooner or later, God will cut her down."

== Publications ==
- Apostate: The Men Who Destroyed the Christian West (2013)
- Worldviews in Conflict (2015)
- Family Life: A Simple Guide to the Biblical Family (2016)
- The Tattooed Jesus: What Would the Real Jesus Do with Pop Culture? (2019)
- Epoch: The Rise and Fall of the West (2021)
