= Rafael Cruz =

Cuban-American minister (born 1939)

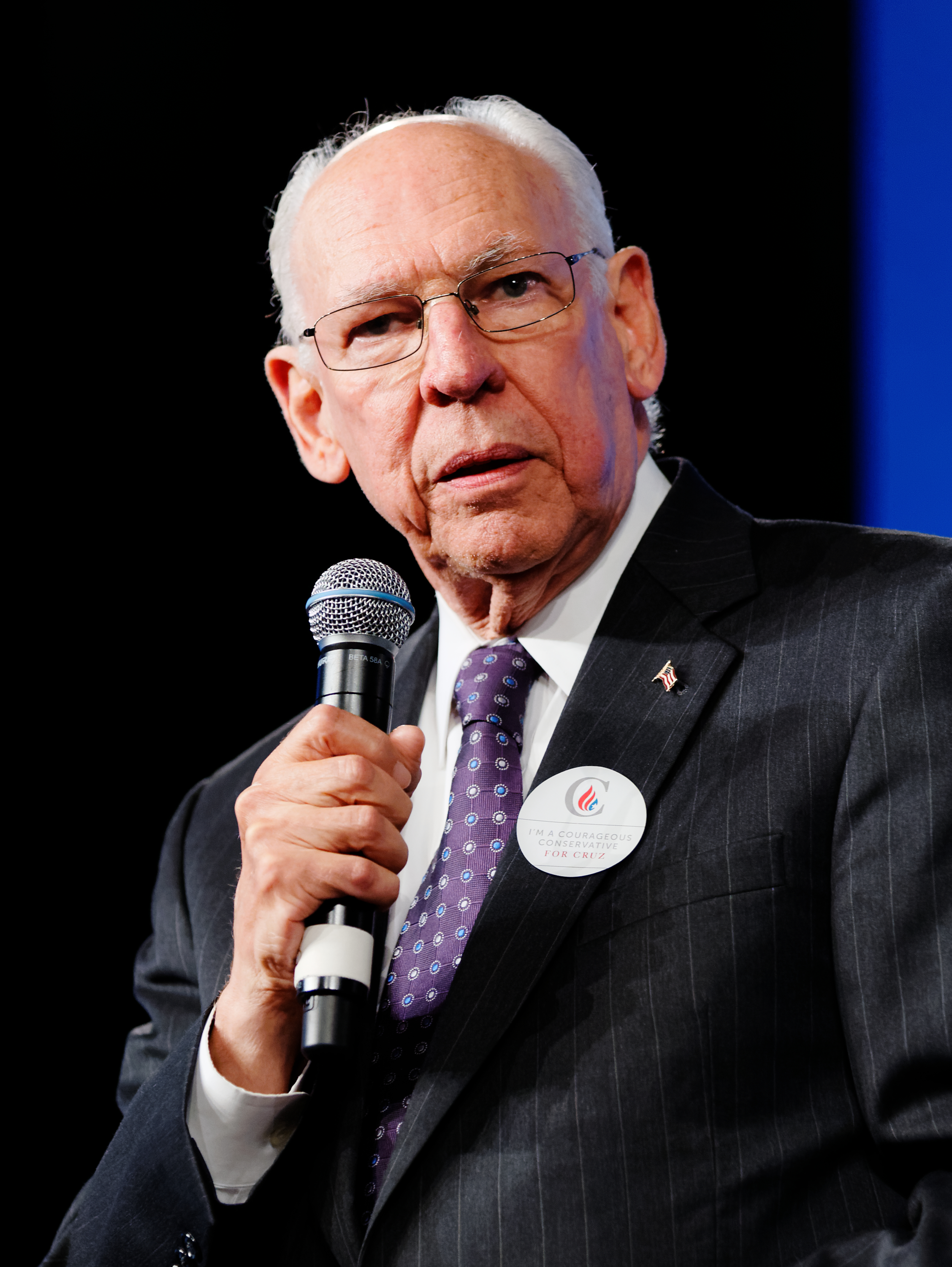
- Cruz speaking at the Southern Republican Leadership Conference in 2015
- Born: Rafael Bienvenido Cruz y Díaz; March 22, 1939 (age 87); Matanzas, Cuba
- Citizenship: Cuba (since 1939); Canada (1973–2005); United States (since 2005)
- Education: University of Santiago de Cuba; University of Texas, Austin (BS)
- Political party: Republican
- Spouses: Julia Garza (m. 1959; div. 1963) Eleanor Darragh Wilson (m. 1969; div. 1997)
- Children: 3, including Ted

Rafael Bienvenido Cruz y Díaz (born March 22, 1939) is a Cuban and American evangelical preacher and the father of U.S. Senator Ted Cruz. He has served as a surrogate in his son's political campaigns.

== Early life ==
Cruz was born on 22 March 1939 in Matanzas, Cuba. His father, also named Rafael Cruz, was a salesman for RCA, and was originally from the Canary Islands in Spain. His mother, Emilia Laudelina Díaz, was a teacher.

Cruz attended Arturo Echemendia primary school in Matanzas. He said he joined the Cuban Revolution as a teenager and "suffered beatings and imprisonment for protesting the oppressive regime" of dictator Fulgencio Batista, although an extensive search by The New York Times found no evidence for his claims. In September 1956 at age 17, Cruz enrolled at the University of Santiago. According to Cruz, as a teenager, he "didn't know Castro was a Communist". Cruz has stated in interviews that he was jailed by Batista for several days in June or July 1957 and after he was released he applied to and was accepted by the University of Texas (UT) in August 1957. He obtained a student visa after an attorney for the family bribed a Batista official to grant him an exit permit. Cruz said he left with $100 sewn into his underwear, taking a two-day bus ride from Florida, arriving with little or no English to enroll at the University of Texas.

He studied mathematics and chemical engineering at UT, graduating in 1961. Cruz states he worked his way through college as a dishwasher, making 50 cents an hour, and learned English by going to movies. Upon returning he revisited the same groups to give lectures opposing Castro and the Revolution. Cruz recounts that his younger sister fought against the new regime in the counter-revolution and was consequently tortured. He remained regretful for his early support of Castro and expressed his remorse to his son on numerous occasions.

== First marriage ==
In 1959, at age 20, Cruz married his first wife, Julia Ann Garza (August 22, 1939 – May 18, 2013). Per Cruz, they divorced some time in 1963. Julia later became a professor of linguistics and Latin American literature at California State University, Stanislaus. They had two daughters, Miriam Cruz (1961–2011) and Roxana Cruz (born November 18, 1962), who is a physician.

== Second marriage and work life ==
After Cruz graduated, he was granted political asylum in the United States following the expiration of his student visa. In his late twenties, Cruz moved to New Orleans. In 1969 at age 30, during his employment at his new oil company job, he met Wilmington, Delaware, native and divorcée, Eleanor Elizabeth Wilson (born November 23, 1934, as Eleanor Darragh). Eleanor's first marriage, at age 21, was to Alan Wilson, a mathematician, in 1956. The couple had moved to London, England, for career opportunities in 1960, divorced in 1963, and the then 31-year-old computer programmer returned to the United States in 1966. Cruz and Wilson were married in 1969, and shortly after were sent to Calgary, Canada, where their only child, Rafael Edward "Ted" Cruz, was born on December 22, 1970. While in Calgary, the couple owned a seismic-data processing firm called R.B. Cruz and Associates that provided services for oil drillers. The firm later became Veritas and ultimately part of CGG. Cruz earned Canadian citizenship in 1973. The family of three then moved to Houston, Texas. Eleanor and Rafael Cruz divorced in 1997.

== Citizenship and employment ==
In 2005, Cruz renounced his Canadian citizenship once he became a naturalized U.S. citizen. Cruz now retains only Cuban and American citizenships.

From 1993 to 2009, Cruz was a salesman for Mannatech, a multi-level marketing firm selling dietary supplements.

== Religious and political beliefs ==
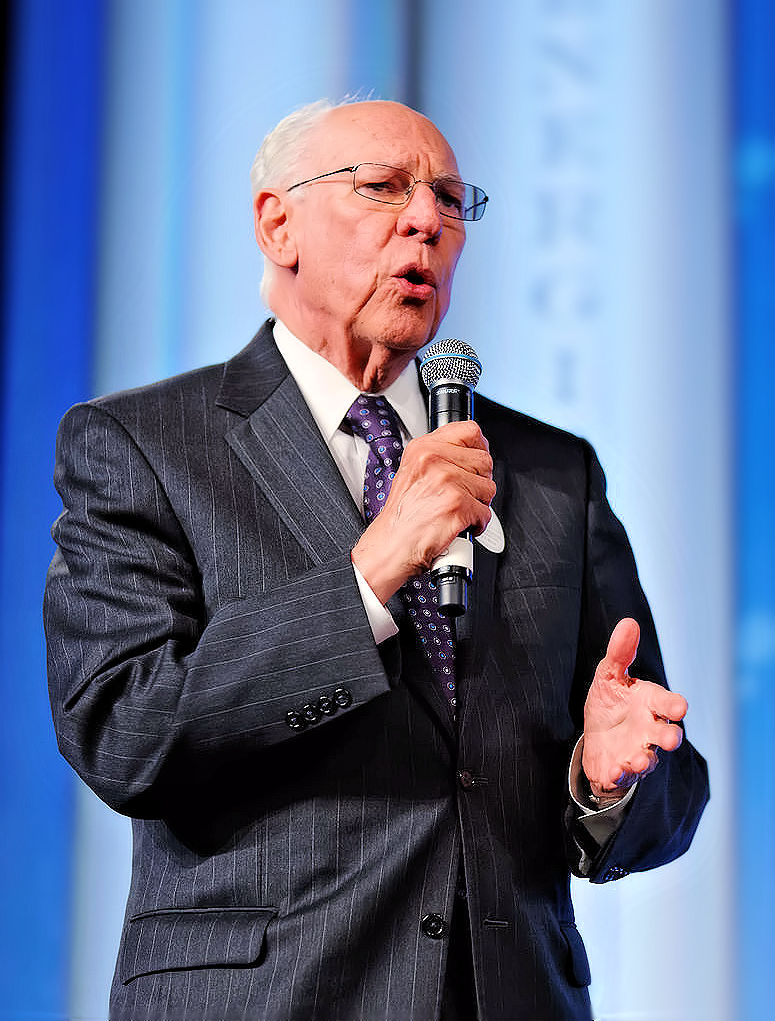
Cruz speaking at the Southern Republican Leadership Conference in Oklahoma City (2015)

Cruz left the Catholic Church in 1975 and became an Evangelical Protestant after attending a Bible study with a colleague and having a born again experience. Explaining his leaving the Catholic church, Cruz stated in an interview with National Review, "The people at the Bible study had a peace that I could not understand, this peace in the midst of trouble. I knew I needed to find that peace by finding Jesus Christ." Following his conversion, his son and wife also became born-again Protestants. In the Cruz home, talk at dinner time was frequently about the Bible. He was ordained as a pastor in 2004.

Cruz works from his home in Carrollton, a suburb of Dallas, as a traveling preacher and public speaker, campaigning as a surrogate for his son during the 2016 presidential campaign season. In a 2014 Associated Press story, Cruz was quoted as saying, "I have a burden for this country and I feel that we cannot sit silent." He went on to say that he feels "It's time we stop being politically correct and start being biblically correct."

About his political involvements in the 1980s, Cruz reflected, "I was on the state board of the Religious Roundtable, a Christian and Jewish religious organization that worked to elect Ronald Reagan." At the time, he told his son, "God has destined you for greatness."

At the New Beginnings Church in Irving, Texas, in August 2012, Cruz delivered a sermon where he described his son's senatorial campaign as taking place within a context where Christian "kings" were anointed to preside over an "end-time transfer of wealth" from wicked people to the righteous. Cruz urged the congregation to "tithe mightily" to achieve that result. During an interview conducted by The Christian Post in 2014, Cruz stated, "I think we cannot separate politics and religion; they are interrelated. They've always been interrelated." Salon described Cruz as a "Dominionist, devoted to a movement that finds in Genesis a mandate that 'men of faith' seize control of public institutions and govern by biblical principle."

Cruz was involved with his son's 2016 presidential campaign, playing what The Boston Globe described as "a crucial—if sometimes divisive—element of the Texas senator's campaign to win over conservative Christian voters." His son's presidential primary opponent, Donald Trump, falsely accused Cruz's father of involvement with John F. Kennedy's assassination. During the campaign, Cruz underwent emergency eye surgery, but returned to campaigning after several weeks' recovery.

Cruz has encouraged Christians to vote, claiming that Christians who say “God is fully in control” are “hyper-Calvinist”.

== See also ==
- Seven Mountain Mandate
