= List of presidents of the National Rifle Association =

President of the National Rifle Association of America
- Incumbent; Bill Bachenberg since 2025
- Term length: 1 year
- Inaugural holder: Ambrose Burnside
- Formation: November 17, 1871
- Salary: Unpaid

The position of president of the National Rifle Association of America (NRA) is a symbolic figurehead role, which dates back to the organization's foundation in New York on November 17, 1871. Founded by George Wood Wingate and William Conant Church, two Union veterans dismayed by the lack of shooting skills among recruits, the rifle association voted to have Union general Ambrose Burnside as its first president. Church succeeded Burnside as the second president of the organization, and Wingate became the tenth in 1886. Traditionally, the first vice president is elevated to president when the position becomes open while the second vice president is similarly promoted, but this practice has not always been followed.

Throughout its history, presidents have served purposes and effects including providing the NRA greater legitimacy; holders of the office have also intentionally provoked outrage and condemnation. Since the 1990s, some NRA presidents have made controversial statements such as when James W. Porter II referred to Barack Obama, whose administration he perceived as hostile to gun rights, as a "fake president" and when Charlton Heston proclaimed to gun control advocates that they could only have his firearm after taking it "from my cold, dead hands."

While once elected at the annual convention, as of 2020, NRA presidents are chosen by the board of directors. They generally serve out two one-year terms. However, the NRA board of directors amended the organization's bylaws to make an exception for actor Charlton Heston to allow him to serve out a unique five-year term and for Charles Cotton to allow him to serve for three terms. Under said bylaws, the position of president is unpaid. During Oliver North's time in office he sought to make the position a paid one, but this initiative failed when he was ousted as president after a power struggle with executive vice president Wayne LaPierre. Some presidents have been employed by the NRA after leaving office. Marion Hammer was the association's first female president and went on to be executive director of the group's Florida affiliate. The executive vice president acts as the group's chief operating officer. Wayne LaPierre held this post between 1991 and 2024, despite several internal challenges to his role.

There have been 67 NRA presidents, serving 69 distinct tenures as both Smith W. Brookhart and Carolyn D. Meadows have served two nonconsecutive times in the office. Others who have held the position include former United States president Ulysses S. Grant, lobbyist Harlon Carter, American Football League commissioner Joe Foss, and conservative activist David Keene.

== Presidents of the National Rifle Association ==
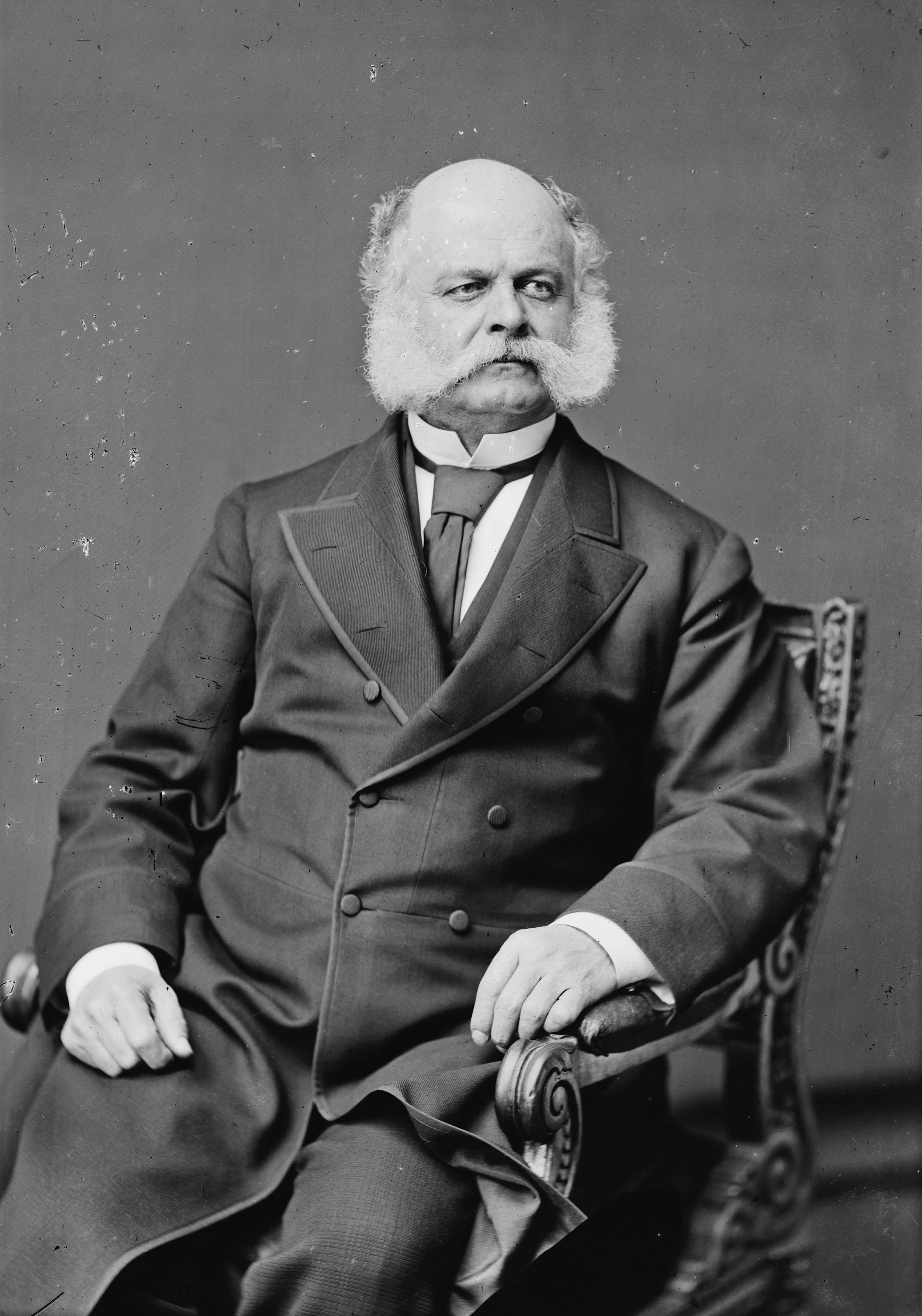
Post-Civil war photograph of Ambrose Burnside of Rhode Island

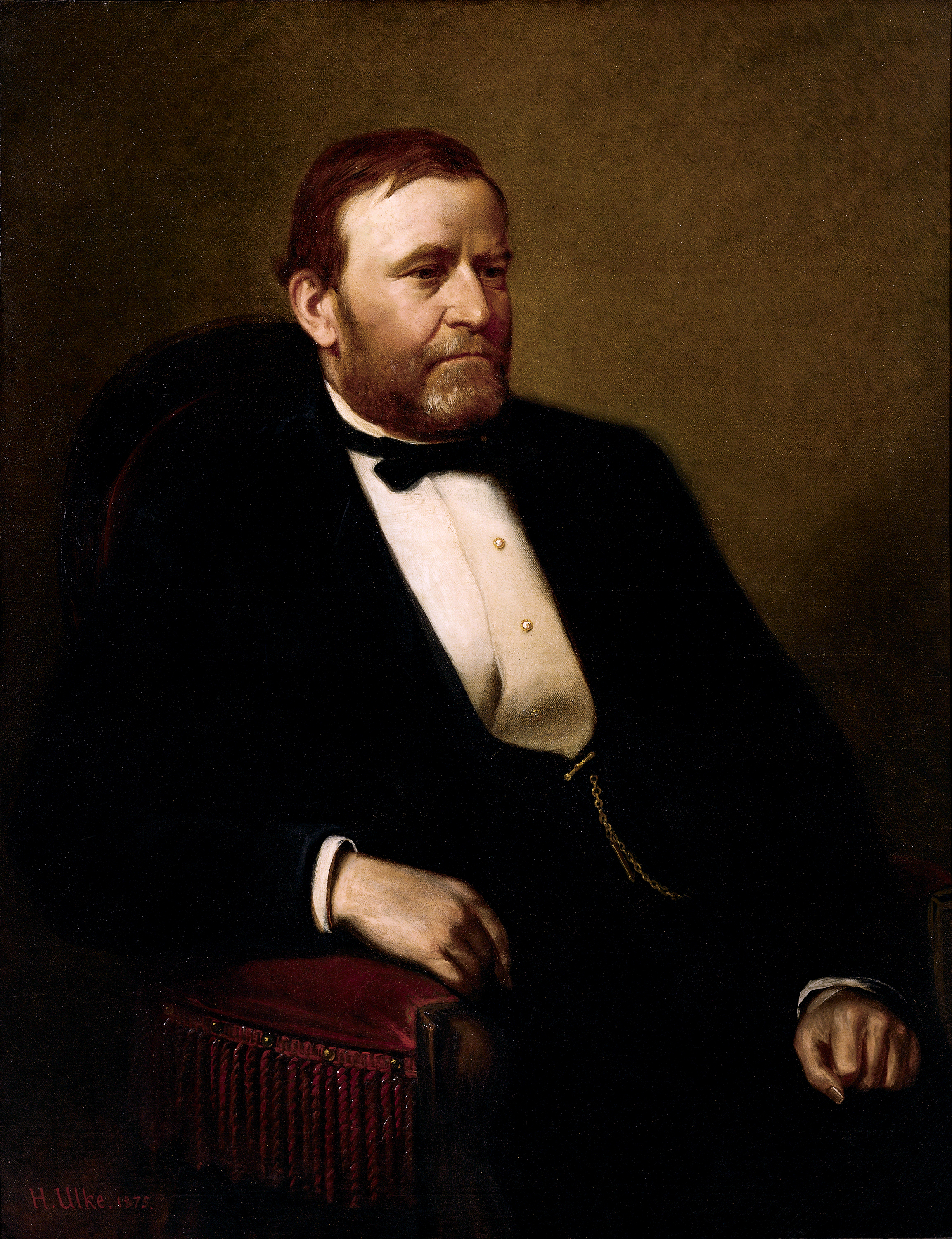
Presidential Portrait of Ulysses S. Grant (1875)

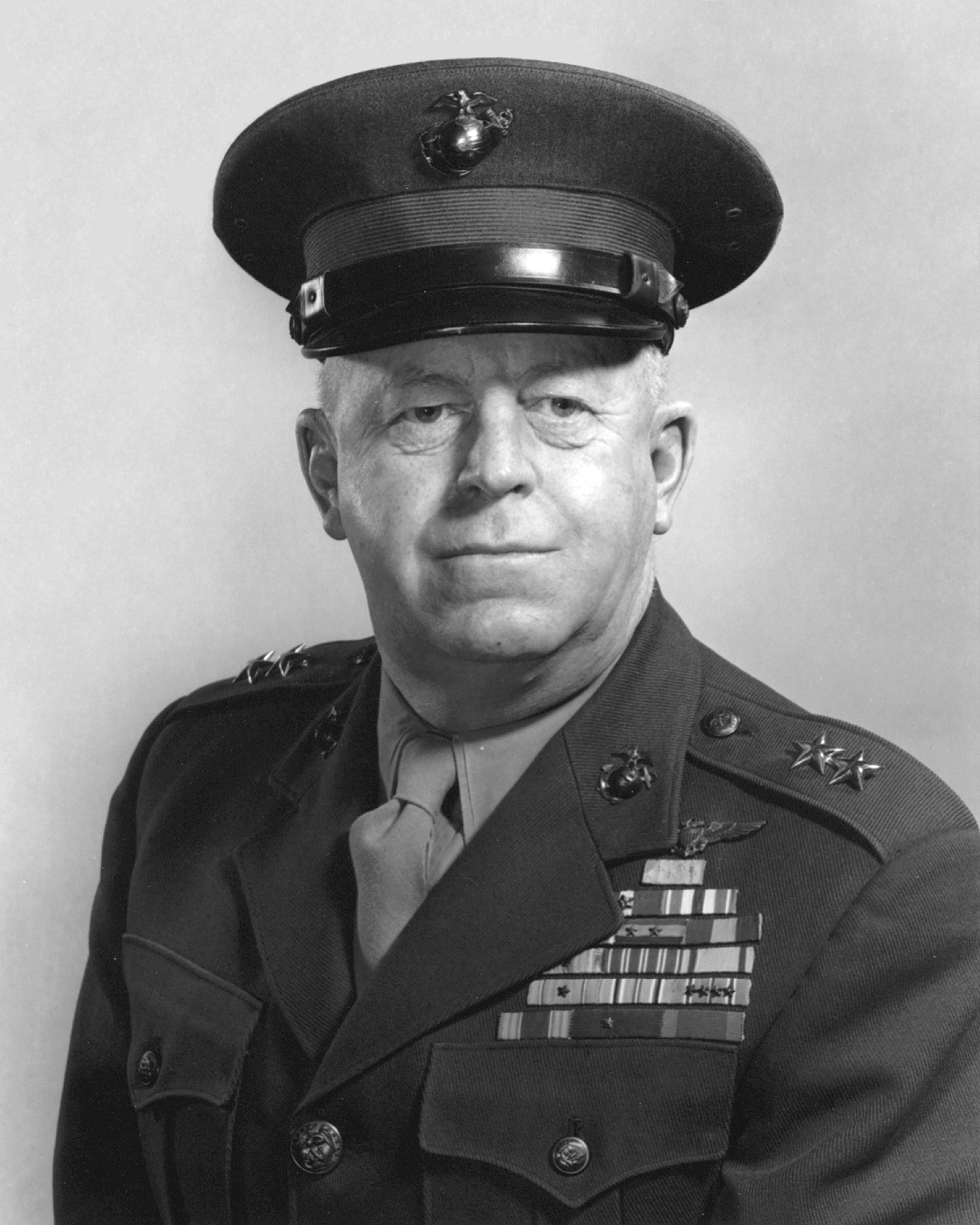
Retired Marine officer "Red Mike" Edson (c. 1936)

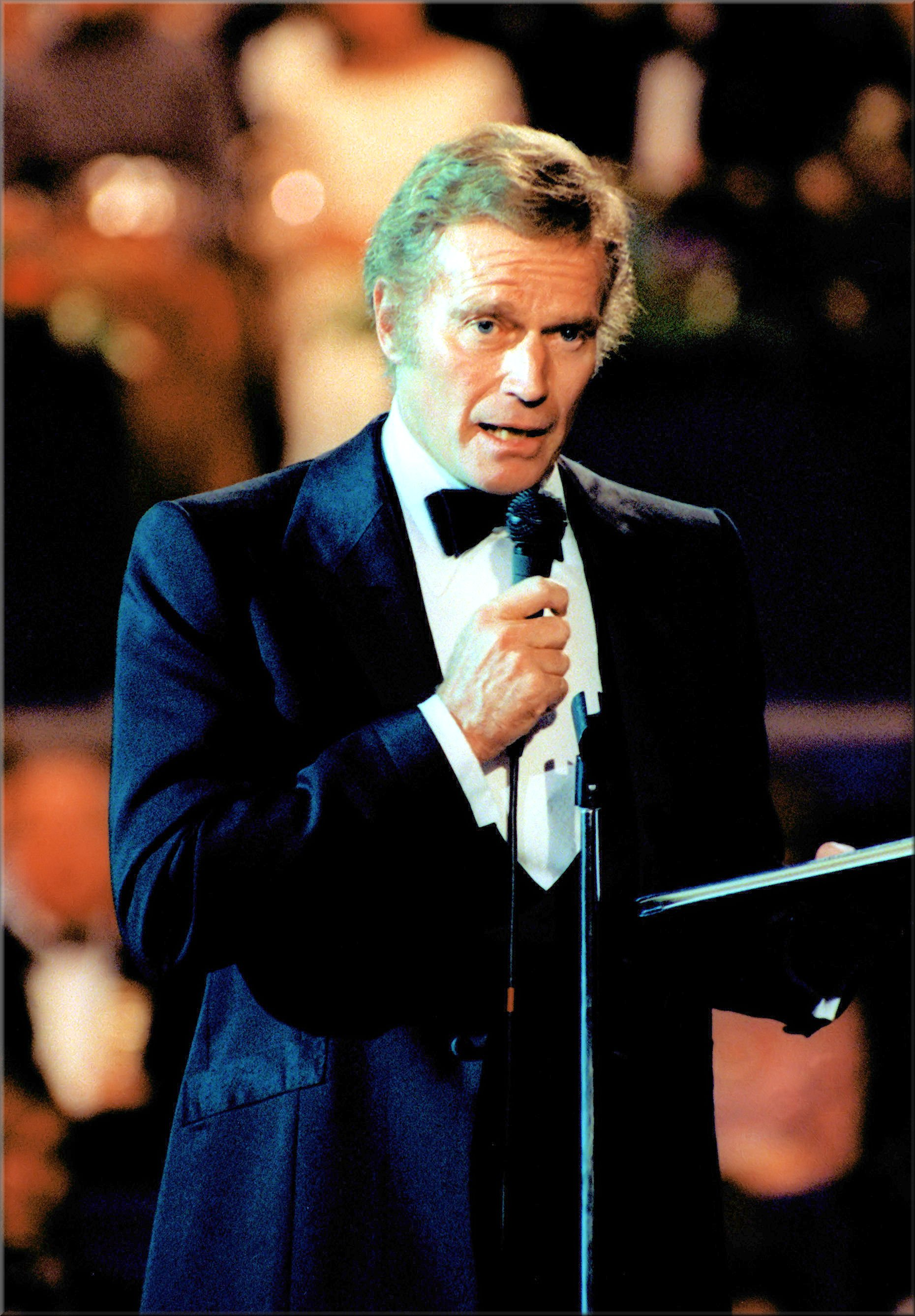
Actor Charlton Heston at an American Film Institute gala (1981)

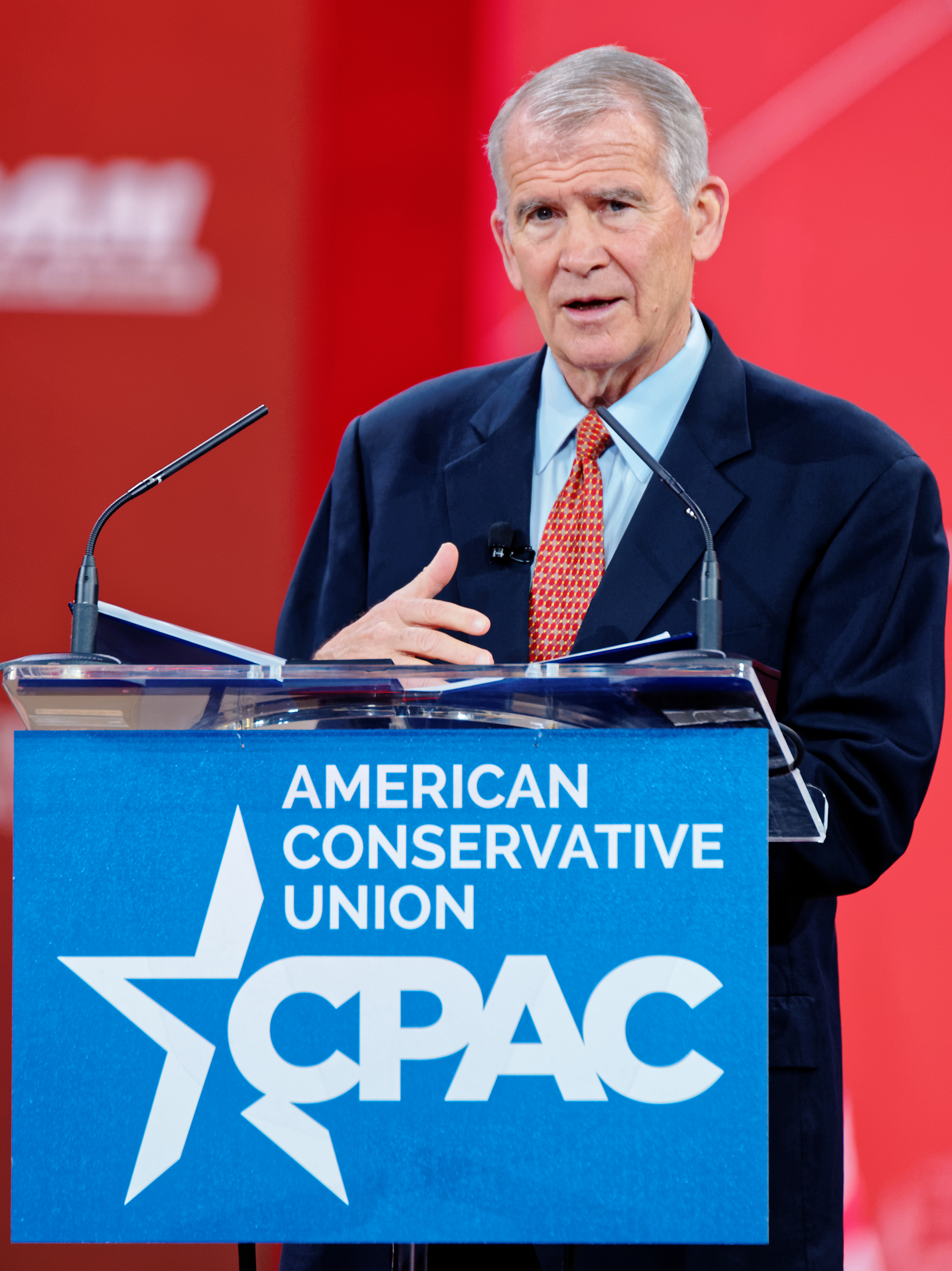
Oliver North speaking at the Conservative Political Action Conference (2015)

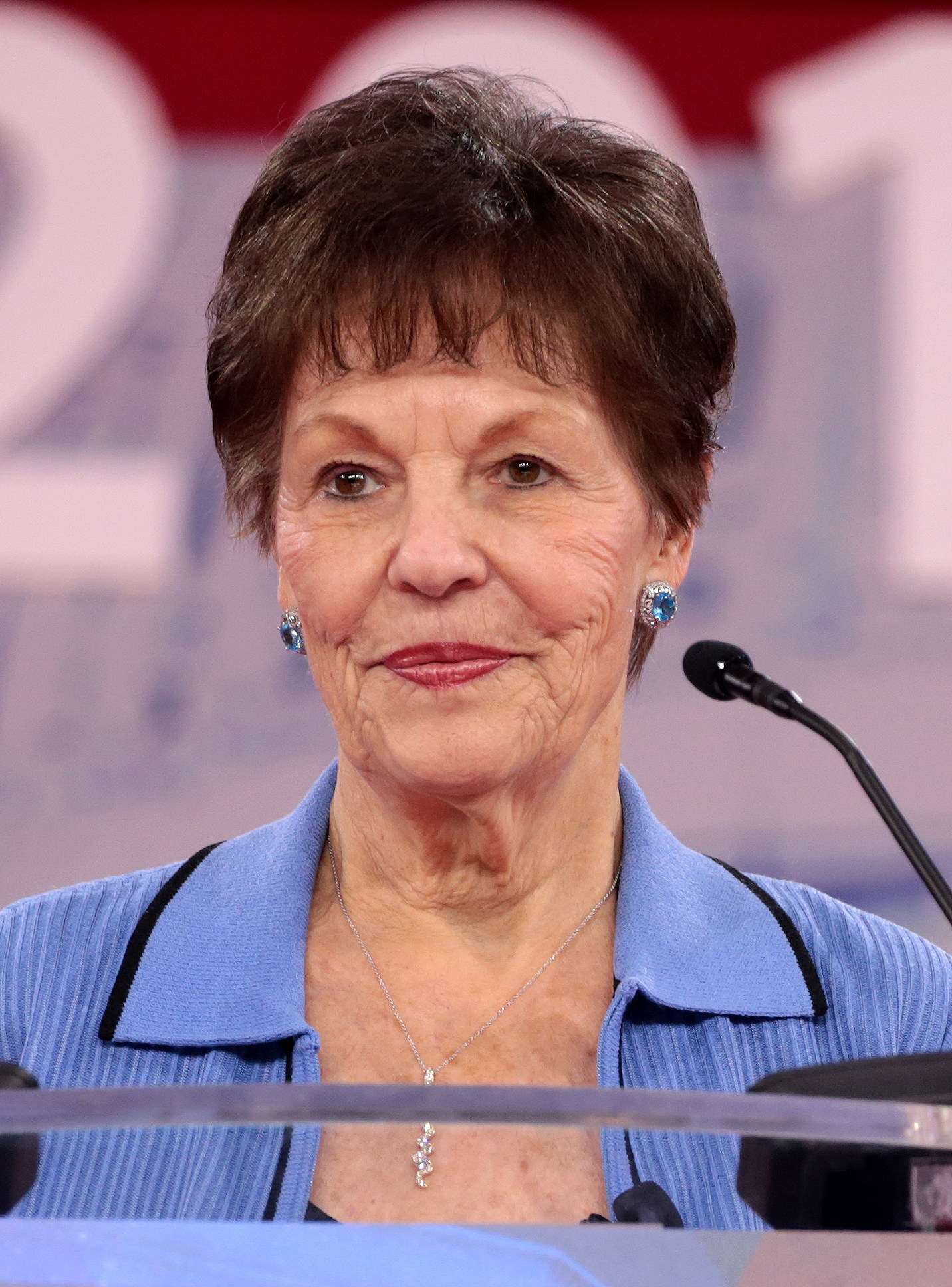
Former president Carolyn Meadows served two nonconsecutive terms

List of presidents
No.	Name	Tenure	Background	Ref.
1	Ambrose Burnside	1871–1872	Union general	
2	William Conant Church	1872–1875	Journalist	
3	Alexander Shaler	1875–1877	Union general	
4	N. P. Stanton	1877–1880	Judge	
5	Henry Alger Gildersleeve	1880	Judge	
6	Winfield S. Hancock	1880–1881	Democratic presidential nominee in 1880	
7	Edward L. Molineux	1882–1883	Union Colonel	
8	Ulysses S. Grant	1883–1884	18th President of the United States	
9	Philip Sheridan	1885	Union general	
10	George Wood Wingate	1886–1900	Union soldier	
11	Bird W. Spencer	1900–1907	Brigadier general	
12	James Drain	1907–1916	Washington adjutant general	
13	William Libbey	1916–1921	Sports shooter	
14	Smith W. Brookhart	1921–1925	U.S. Senator from Iowa	
15	Francis E. Warren	1925 (Note: Resigned May 16, 1925, along with first Vice President Major General Fred C. Ainsworth. At the time, Fred M. Waterbury was second Vice President.)	U.S. Senator from Wyoming	
16	Smith W. Brookhart	1925–1926	U.S. Senator from Iowa	
17	Fred M. Waterbury	1926–1927	Lieutenant colonel	
18	Lewis Miller Rumsey Jr.	1928	Lieutenant colonel	
19	Patrick J. Hurley	1929	Assistant Secretary of War	
20	Benedict Crowell	1930–1931	Brigadier general	
21	G. A. Fraser	1932	Brigadier general	
22	Karl T. Frederick	1934	Sports shooter	
23	Ammon B. Critchfield	1936	Ohio adjutant general	
24	Gustavus D. Pope	1937–1938	Humanitarian	
25	Littleton W. T. Waller Jr.	1939	Brigadier general	
26	Nathaniel C. Nash	1941	Botanist	
27	Hilliard Comstock	1942–1943	Judge	
28	Thurman Randle	1944–1946	Lieutenant colonel	
29	Francis W. Parker Jr.	1946–1947	Patent lawyer	
30	Emmett Swanson	1948–1949	Sports shooter	
31	Merritt A. Edson	1949–1950	Marine Corps general	
32	Harry D. Linn	1951–1952	Businessman	
33	J. Alvin Badeaux	1953–1954	Businessman	
34	Morton C. Mumma	1955	Rear admiral	
35	George R. Whittington	1957	Attorney	
36	Irvine C. Porter	1959–1961	Attorney	
37	John M. Schooley	1961–1963	Sheriff of Denver	
38	Bartlett Rummel	1963–1964	Judge	
39	Harlon Carter	1965–1967	Activist	
40	Harold W. Glassen	1967–1968	Sports shooter	
41	Woodson D. Scott	1969–1970	Attorney	
42	Fred M. Hakenjos	1971	Artist	
43	Clinton R. Gutermuth	1973–1974	Conservationist	
44	Merrill W. Wright	1975	Major general	
45	Lloyd M. Mustin	1977–1978	Vice admiral	
46	John B. Layton	1979	Chief of police of Washington, D.C.	
47	Keith M. Gaffaney	1981–1983	Police officer	
48	Howard W. Pollock	1983–1985	Alaskan congressman	
49	Alonzo H. Garcelon	1985	Dentist	
50	James E. Reinke	1985–1988	Eastern Airlines vice president	
51	Joe Foss	1988–1990	20th Governor of South Dakota	
52	Richard D. Riley	1990–1992	Activist	
53	Robert K. Corbin	1992–1993	Arizona Attorney General	
54	Thomas L. Washington	1994–1995	Conservationist	
55	Marion Hammer	1995–1998	Activist	
56	Charlton Heston	1998–2003	Actor	
57	Kayne Robinson	2003–2005	Des Moines chief of detectives	
58	Sandra Froman	2005–2007	Attorney	
59	John C. Sigler	2007–2009	Attorney	
60	Ron Schmeits	2009–2011	Mayor of Jordan, Minnesota	
61	David Keene	2011–2013	Activist	
62	James W. Porter II	2013–2015	Activist (Note: Son of Irvine C. Porter)	
63	Allan D. Cors	2015–2017	Sports shooter	
64	Pete Brownell	2017–2018	Businessman	
65	Carolyn D. Meadows	2018	Activist	
66	Oliver North	2018–2019	Lieutenant Colonel	
67	Carolyn D. Meadows	2019–2021	Activist	
67	Charles Cotton	2021–2024	Activist	
68	Bob Barr	2024–2025	Attorney and U.S. representative	
69	Bill Bachenberg	since 2025	Businessman	
