= 2000 United States presidential election in Georgia =

- November 7, 2000
- Turnout: 50.9% ▲1.3 pp

Nominee	George W. Bush	Al Gore
Party	Republican	Democratic
Home state	Texas	Tennessee
Running mate	Dick Cheney	Joe Lieberman
Electoral vote	13	0
Popular vote	1,419,720	1,116,230
Percentage	54.67%	42.98%

Bush
40–50%
50–60%
60–70%
70–80%
80–90%
Gore
40–50%
50–60%
60–70%
70–80%
80–90%
90–100%
Tie/No Data
President before election
Bill Clinton
Democratic
Elected President
George W. Bush
Republican

The 2000 United States presidential election in Georgia took place on November 7, 2000, and was part of the 2000 United States presidential election. Voters chose 13 representatives, or electors, to the Electoral College, who voted for president and vice president.

Georgia was won by Governor George W. Bush (R-TX) by an 11.7% margin of victory. He won a majority of the popular vote, counties, and congressional districts. Bush dominated in most of the rural parts of the state, but Vice President Al Gore (D-TN) did well in highly populated Fulton; and majority-Black DeKalb and Clayton counties of the Metro Atlanta area. Within that area are the 4th and 5th congressional districts, which are the only two districts Gore won. Author and investment analyst Harry Browne (L-TN) would finish third in the popular vote in Georgia.

In 1992 and 1996, Georgia was the first and third closest state, respectively. In 2000, however, Georgia was not a close state at all, as the Democratic candidate, Vice President Al Gore, did not do as well as Bill Clinton in the general election. In other down-ballot races, Zell Miller (D), who was appointed by then-Governor Roy Barnes (D) following Senator Paul Coverdell's (R) death in July 2000, won the special election for the unexpired remainder of the term. Another notable down ballot race was the 2000 U.S. House election in Georgia's 2nd congressional district in which Incumbent U.S. Representative Sanford Bishop (D) survived a strong challenge from Dylan Glenn (R). Miller in the Senate race actually outperformed Gore in the presidential race by over 30 points. The state was also 1 of 14 that Bill Clinton carried at least once during the elections of 1992 and 1996 (having carried it in 1992) that Gore lost.

In this election, Georgia voted 12.21% to the right of the nation at-large.

As of the 2024 presidential election, this is the last election in which Chatham County voted Republican and the last in which McIntosh County, Meriwether County, Mitchell County, Telfair County, and Wilkinson County voted Democratic.

== General election ==
=== Polling ===
Poll source	Date(s)	Sample size	Margin of error	George W. Bush (R)	Al Gore (D)	Ralph Nader (G)	Other / undecided (Note: Calculated by taking the difference of 100% and all other listed candidates combined. For polls that do not report a figure for Nader, this includes his support.)
Harris Insights & Analytics	November 3, 2000	6,987	—	51%	43%	—	6%
Marketing Workshop	October 29, 2000	512	—	53%	37%	2%	8%
Rasmussen Reports	October 22, 2000	1,029	—	50%	40%	—	10%

=== Results ===
United States presidential election in Georgia, 2000
Party	Candidate	Running mate	Votes	Percentage	Electoral votes
Republican	George W. Bush	Dick Cheney	1,419,720	54.67%	13
Democratic	Al Gore	Joe Lieberman	1,116,230	42.98%	0
Libertarian	Harry Browne	Art Olivier	36,332	1.40%	0
Green	Ralph Nader (write-in)	Winona LaDuke	13,432	0.52%	0
Reform	Patrick Buchanan	Ezola B. Foster	10,926	0.42%	0
Constitution	Howard Phillips (write-in)	Curtis Frazier	140	0.0%	0
Socialist Workers	James Harris (write-in)	Margaret Trowe	11	0.0%	0
Write-in	Gloria Strickland	n/a	8	0.0%	0
Independent	Joe Schriner (write-in)	n/a	5	0.0%	0
Totals			2,596,804	100.00%	13
Voter turnout (Voting age)				43%	

==== By county ====
County	George W. Bush Republican		Al Gore Democratic		Various candidates Other parties		Margin		Total
County	#	%	#	%	#	%	#	%	Total
Appling	3,940	64.60%	2,093	34.32%	66	1.08%	1,847	30.28%	6,099
Atkinson	1,228	59.30%	821	39.64%	22	1.06%	407	19.66%	2,071
Bacon	2,010	67.11%	956	31.92%	29	0.97%	1,054	35.19%	2,995
Baker	615	40.49%	893	58.79%	11	0.72%	-278	-18.30%	1,519
Baldwin	6,041	49.82%	5,893	48.60%	192	1.58%	148	1.22%	12,126
Banks	3,202	70.64%	1,220	26.91%	111	2.45%	1,982	43.73%	4,533
Barrow	7,925	65.49%	3,657	30.22%	520	4.30%	4,268	35.27%	12,102
Bartow	14,720	64.62%	7,508	32.96%	553	2.43%	7,212	31.66%	22,781
Ben Hill	2,381	51.08%	2,234	47.93%	46	0.99%	147	3.15%	4,661
Berrien	2,718	61.63%	1,640	37.19%	52	1.18%	1,078	24.44%	4,410
Bibb	24,071	48.36%	24,996	50.22%	709	1.42%	-925	-1.86%	49,776
Bleckley	2,436	64.98%	1,273	33.96%	40	1.07%	1,163	31.02%	3,749
Brantley	3,118	68.29%	1,372	30.05%	76	1.66%	1,746	38.24%	4,566
Brooks	2,406	52.87%	2,096	46.06%	49	1.08%	310	6.81%	4,551
Bryan	4,835	68.49%	2,172	30.77%	52	0.74%	2,663	37.72%	7,059
Bulloch	8,990	60.82%	5,561	37.62%	231	1.56%	3,429	23.20%	14,782
Burke	3,381	47.39%	3,720	52.14%	34	0.48%	-339	-4.75%	7,135
Butts	3,198	56.75%	2,281	40.48%	156	2.77%	917	16.27%	5,635
Calhoun	768	40.70%	1,107	58.66%	12	0.64%	-339	-17.96%	1,887
Camden	6,371	62.96%	3,636	35.93%	112	1.11%	2,735	27.03%	10,119
Candler	1,643	60.36%	1,053	38.68%	26	0.96%	590	21.68%	2,722
Carroll	16,326	63.42%	8,752	34.00%	663	2.58%	7,574	29.42%	25,741
Catoosa	12,033	67.90%	5,470	30.87%	218	1.23%	6,563	37.03%	17,721
Charlton	1,770	62.86%	1,015	36.04%	31	1.10%	755	26.82%	2,816
Chatham	37,847	49.49%	37,590	49.15%	1,038	1.36%	257	0.34%	76,475
Chattahoochee	590	48.88%	600	49.71%	17	1.41%	-10	-0.83%	1,207
Chattooga	3,640	56.20%	2,729	42.13%	108	1.67%	911	14.07%	6,477
Cherokee	38,033	72.65%	12,295	23.49%	2,020	3.86%	25,738	49.16%	52,348
Clarke	11,850	41.00%	15,167	52.47%	1,887	6.53%	-3,317	-11.47%	28,904
Clay	448	35.08%	821	64.29%	8	0.63%	-373	-29.21%	1,277
Clayton	19,966	32.52%	40,042	65.21%	1,394	2.27%	-20,076	-32.69%	61,402
Clinch	1,091	56.56%	816	42.30%	22	1.14%	275	14.26%	1,929
Cobb	140,494	59.78%	86,676	36.88%	7,857	3.34%	53,818	22.90%	235,027
Coffee	5,756	61.04%	3,593	38.10%	81	0.86%	2,163	22.94%	9,430
Colquitt	6,589	66.08%	3,297	33.06%	86	0.86%	3,292	33.02%	9,972
Columbia	26,660	74.04%	8,969	24.91%	379	1.05%	17,691	49.13%	36,008
Cook	2,279	57.78%	1,639	41.56%	26	0.66%	640	16.22%	3,944
Coweta	21,327	68.30%	9,056	29.00%	843	2.70%	12,271	39.30%	31,226
Crawford	1,987	55.71%	1,513	42.42%	67	1.88%	474	13.29%	3,567
Crisp	3,285	58.57%	2,268	40.44%	56	1.00%	1,017	18.13%	5,609
Dade	3,333	66.01%	1,628	32.24%	88	1.74%	1,705	33.77%	5,049
Dawson	4,210	71.38%	1,458	24.72%	230	3.90%	2,752	46.66%	5,898
Decatur	4,187	54.75%	3,398	44.43%	63	0.82%	789	10.32%	7,648
DeKalb	58,807	26.73%	154,509	70.24%	6,664	3.03%	-95,702	-43.51%	219,980
Dodge	3,472	59.08%	2,326	39.58%	79	1.34%	1,146	19.50%	5,877
Dooly	1,588	45.11%	1,901	54.01%	31	0.88%	-313	-8.90%	3,520
Dougherty	12,248	42.14%	16,650	57.29%	166	0.57%	-4,402	-15.15%	29,064
Douglas	18,893	61.02%	11,162	36.05%	909	2.94%	7,731	24.97%	30,964
Early	1,938	54.06%	1,622	45.24%	25	0.70%	316	8.82%	3,585
Echols	614	68.37%	272	30.29%	12	1.34%	342	38.08%	898
Effingham	7,326	68.79%	3,232	30.35%	92	0.86%	4,094	38.44%	10,650
Elbert	3,262	55.73%	2,527	43.17%	64	1.09%	735	12.56%	5,853
Emanuel	3,343	53.38%	2,835	45.27%	85	1.36%	508	8.11%	6,263
Evans	1,841	59.77%	1,217	39.51%	22	0.71%	624	20.26%	3,080
Fannin	5,463	65.11%	2,736	32.61%	191	2.28%	2,727	32.50%	8,390
Fayette	29,338	69.11%	11,912	28.06%	1,199	2.82%	17,426	41.05%	42,449
Floyd	16,194	60.37%	10,282	38.33%	349	1.30%	5,912	22.04%	26,825
Forsyth	27,769	77.66%	6,694	18.72%	1,292	3.61%	21,075	58.94%	35,755
Franklin	3,659	63.50%	2,040	35.40%	63	1.09%	1,619	28.10%	5,762
Fulton	104,870	39.84%	152,039	57.76%	6,303	2.39%	-47,169	-17.92%	263,212
Gilmer	4,941	67.04%	2,230	30.26%	199	2.70%	2,711	36.78%	7,370
Glascock	763	74.80%	249	24.41%	8	0.78%	514	50.39%	1,020
Glynn	14,346	64.09%	7,778	34.75%	260	1.16%	6,568	29.34%	22,384
Gordon	7,944	65.09%	4,032	33.04%	229	1.88%	3,912	32.05%	12,205
Grady	3,894	58.09%	2,721	40.59%	88	1.31%	1,173	17.50%	6,703
Greene	2,980	57.34%	2,137	41.12%	80	1.54%	843	16.22%	5,197
Gwinnett	121,756	63.71%	61,434	32.15%	7,921	4.14%	60,322	31.56%	191,111
Habersham	6,964	71.86%	2,530	26.11%	197	2.03%	4,434	45.75%	9,691
Hall	26,841	70.36%	10,259	26.89%	1,050	2.75%	16,582	43.47%	38,150
Hancock	662	21.45%	2,414	78.22%	10	0.32%	-1,752	-56.77%	3,086
Haralson	5,153	63.10%	2,869	35.13%	145	1.78%	2,284	27.97%	8,167
Harris	5,554	64.87%	2,912	34.01%	96	1.12%	2,642	30.86%	8,562
Hart	4,242	56.29%	3,192	42.36%	102	1.35%	1,050	13.93%	7,536
Heard	1,947	60.88%	1,178	36.84%	73	2.28%	769	24.04%	3,198
Henry	25,815	66.42%	11,971	30.80%	1,081	2.78%	13,844	35.62%	38,867
Houston	23,174	62.65%	13,301	35.96%	513	1.39%	9,873	26.69%	36,988
Irwin	1,720	60.31%	1,105	38.74%	27	0.95%	615	21.57%	2,852
Jackson	7,878	67.71%	3,420	29.39%	337	2.90%	4,458	38.32%	11,635
Jasper	2,298	58.28%	1,558	39.51%	87	2.21%	740	18.77%	3,943
Jeff Davis	2,797	66.26%	1,379	32.67%	45	1.07%	1,418	33.59%	4,221
Jefferson	2,559	45.98%	2,973	53.41%	34	0.61%	-414	-7.43%	5,566
Jenkins	1,317	50.79%	1,250	48.21%	26	1.00%	67	2.58%	2,593
Johnson	1,797	62.33%	1,065	36.94%	21	0.73%	732	25.39%	2,883
Jones	4,850	60.11%	3,102	38.45%	116	1.44%	1,748	21.66%	8,068
Lamar	2,912	55.68%	2,194	41.95%	124	2.37%	718	13.73%	5,230
Lanier	1,048	55.04%	832	43.70%	24	1.26%	216	11.34%	1,904
Laurens	8,133	57.94%	5,724	40.78%	179	1.28%	2,409	17.16%	14,036
Lee	5,872	74.48%	1,936	24.56%	76	0.96%	3,936	49.92%	7,884
Liberty	4,455	44.68%	5,347	53.62%	170	1.70%	-892	-8.94%	9,972
Lincoln	1,807	58.23%	1,275	41.09%	21	0.68%	532	17.14%	3,103
Long	1,320	57.04%	975	42.13%	19	0.82%	345	14.91%	2,314
Lowndes	14,462	56.87%	10,616	41.74%	354	1.39%	3,846	15.13%	25,432
Lumpkin	4,427	65.59%	2,121	31.42%	202	2.99%	2,306	34.17%	6,750
Macon	1,566	35.96%	2,757	63.31%	32	0.73%	-1,191	-27.35%	4,355
Madison	5,529	69.17%	2,285	28.59%	179	2.24%	3,244	40.58%	7,993
Marion	1,187	54.35%	982	44.96%	15	0.69%	205	9.39%	2,184
McDuffie	3,926	59.94%	2,580	39.39%	44	0.67%	1,346	20.55%	6,550
McIntosh	1,766	46.03%	2,047	53.35%	24	0.63%	-281	-7.32%	3,837
Meriwether	3,162	47.13%	3,441	51.29%	106	1.58%	-279	-4.16%	6,709
Miller	1,349	62.74%	783	36.42%	18	0.84%	566	26.32%	2,150
Mitchell	2,790	48.11%	2,971	51.23%	38	0.66%	-181	-3.12%	5,799
Monroe	4,561	60.48%	2,839	37.65%	141	1.87%	1,722	22.83%	7,541
Montgomery	1,465	58.39%	1,013	40.37%	31	1.24%	452	18.02%	2,509
Morgan	3,524	59.71%	2,238	37.92%	140	2.37%	1,286	21.79%	5,902
Murray	5,539	66.16%	2,684	32.06%	149	1.78%	2,855	34.10%	8,372
Muscogee	23,479	45.01%	28,193	54.05%	491	0.94%	-4,714	-9.04%	52,163
Newton	11,127	60.56%	6,703	36.48%	545	2.97%	4,424	24.08%	18,375
Oconee	7,611	68.15%	3,184	28.51%	373	3.34%	4,427	39.64%	11,168
Oglethorpe	2,706	61.71%	1,519	34.64%	160	3.65%	1,187	27.07%	4,385
Paulding	16,881	69.58%	6,743	27.79%	636	2.62%	10,138	41.79%	24,260
Peach	3,525	49.39%	3,540	49.60%	72	1.01%	-15	-0.21%	7,137
Pickens	5,488	66.92%	2,489	30.35%	224	2.73%	2,999	36.57%	8,201
Pierce	3,348	71.52%	1,300	27.77%	33	0.70%	2,048	43.75%	4,681
Pike	3,358	68.74%	1,413	28.93%	114	2.33%	1,945	39.81%	4,885
Polk	5,841	57.74%	4,112	40.65%	163	1.61%	1,729	17.09%	10,116
Pulaski	1,922	57.44%	1,390	41.54%	34	1.02%	532	15.90%	3,346
Putnam	3,596	57.09%	2,612	41.47%	91	1.44%	984	15.62%	6,299
Quitman	348	38.50%	542	59.96%	14	1.55%	-194	-21.46%	904
Rabun	3,451	64.61%	1,776	33.25%	114	2.13%	1,675	31.36%	5,341
Randolph	1,174	45.70%	1,381	53.76%	14	0.54%	-207	-8.06%	2,569
Richmond	25,485	44.29%	31,413	54.60%	640	1.11%	-5,928	-10.31%	57,538
Rockdale	15,440	62.64%	8,295	33.65%	914	3.71%	7,145	28.99%	24,649
Schley	706	60.03%	460	39.12%	10	0.85%	246	20.91%	1,176
Screven	2,461	52.15%	2,233	47.32%	25	0.53%	228	4.83%	4,719
Seminole	1,537	53.42%	1,313	45.64%	27	0.94%	224	7.78%	2,877
Spalding	9,271	60.24%	5,831	37.89%	289	1.88%	3,440	22.35%	15,391
Stephens	5,370	64.11%	2,869	34.25%	137	1.64%	2,501	29.86%	8,376
Stewart	675	34.54%	1,267	64.84%	12	0.61%	-592	-30.30%	1,954
Sumter	4,847	49.98%	4,748	48.96%	102	1.05%	99	1.02%	9,697
Talbot	844	33.35%	1,662	65.67%	25	0.99%	-818	-32.32%	2,531
Taliaferro	271	32.57%	556	66.83%	5	0.60%	-285	-34.26%	832
Tattnall	3,597	64.12%	1,963	34.99%	50	0.89%	1,634	29.13%	5,610
Taylor	1,412	50.79%	1,340	48.20%	28	1.01%	72	2.59%	2,780
Telfair	1,693	48.47%	1,777	50.87%	23	0.66%	-84	-2.40%	3,493
Terrell	1,504	48.31%	1,584	50.88%	25	0.80%	-80	-2.57%	3,113
Thomas	7,093	58.82%	4,862	40.32%	103	0.85%	2,231	18.50%	12,058
Tift	6,678	64.66%	3,547	34.34%	103	1.00%	3,131	30.32%	10,328
Toombs	4,487	62.23%	2,643	36.66%	80	1.11%	1,844	25.57%	7,210
Towns	2,902	64.53%	1,495	33.24%	100	2.22%	1,407	31.29%	4,497
Treutlen	1,062	54.10%	879	44.78%	22	1.12%	183	9.32%	1,963
Troup	11,198	62.90%	6,379	35.83%	227	1.27%	4,819	27.07%	17,804
Turner	1,258	51.22%	1,169	47.60%	29	1.18%	89	3.62%	2,456
Twiggs	1,570	43.43%	1,977	54.69%	68	1.88%	-407	-11.26%	3,615
Union	4,567	65.66%	2,230	32.06%	159	2.29%	2,337	33.60%	6,956
Upson	5,019	60.60%	3,158	38.13%	105	1.27%	1,861	22.47%	8,282
Walker	12,326	65.23%	6,341	33.56%	228	1.21%	5,985	31.67%	18,895
Walton	12,966	67.95%	5,484	28.74%	633	3.32%	7,482	39.21%	19,083
Ware	6,099	63.35%	3,480	36.14%	49	0.51%	2,619	27.21%	9,628
Warren	933	43.50%	1,196	55.76%	16	0.75%	-263	-12.26%	2,145
Washington	3,162	47.26%	3,476	51.95%	53	0.79%	-314	-4.69%	6,691
Wayne	5,219	65.20%	2,736	34.18%	49	0.61%	2,483	31.02%	8,004
Webster	359	39.49%	541	59.52%	9	0.99%	-182	-20.03%	909
Wheeler	813	51.62%	752	47.75%	10	0.63%	61	3.87%	1,575
White	4,857	68.96%	2,014	28.60%	172	2.44%	2,843	40.36%	7,043
Whitfield	15,852	68.03%	7,034	30.19%	416	1.79%	8,818	37.84%	23,302
Wilcox	1,381	58.39%	962	40.68%	22	0.93%	419	17.71%	2,365
Wilkes	2,044	50.77%	1,940	48.19%	42	1.04%	104	2.58%	4,026
Wilkinson	1,800	48.13%	1,884	50.37%	56	1.50%	-84	-2.24%	3,740
Worth	3,792	62.56%	2,214	36.53%	55	0.91%	1,578	26.03%	6,061
Totals	1,419,720	54.67%	1,116,230	42.98%	60,854	2.34%	303,490	11.69%	2,596,804

===== Counties that flipped from Democratic to Republican =====
- Atkinson (largest city: Pearson)
- Baldwin (largest city: Milledgeville)
- Ben Hill (largest city: Fitzgerald)
- Berrien (largest city: Nashville)
- Brooks (largest city: Quitman)
- Butts (largest city: Jackson)
- Chatham (largest city: Savannah)
- Chattooga (largest city: Summerville)
- Clinch (largest city: Homerville)
- Cook (largest city: Adel)
- Crawford (largest city: Roberta)
- Crisp (largest city: Cordele)
- Decatur (largest city: Bainbridge)
- Dodge (largest city: Eastman)
- Early (largest city: Blakely)
- Elbert (largest city: Elberton)
- Emanuel (largest city: Swainsboro)
- Grady (largest city: Cairo)
- Greene (largest city: Greensboro)
- Hart (largest city: Hartwell)
- Heard (largest city: Franklin)
- Irwin (largest city: Ocilla)
- Jasper (largest city: Monticello)
- Jenkins (largest city: Millen)
- Johnson (largest city: Wrightsville)
- Lamar (largest city: Barnesville)
- Lanier (largest city: Lakeland)
- Long (largest city: Ludowici)
- Marion (largest city: Buena Vista)
- Miller (largest city: Colquitt)
- Montgomery (largest city: Mount Vernon)
- Polk (largest city: Cedartown)
- Pulaski (largest city: Hawkinsville)
- Putnam (largest city: Eatonton)
- Schley (largest city: Ellaville)
- Screven (largest city: Sylvania)
- Seminole (largest city: Donalsonville)
- Sumter (largest city: Americus)
- Taylor (largest city: Butler)
- Treutlen (largest city: Soperton)
- Turner (largest city: Ashburn)
- Wheeler (largest city: Alamo)
- Wilcox (largest city: Abbeville)
- Wilkes (largest city: Washington)

==== By congressional district ====
Bush won nine of 11 congressional districts, including one held by a Democrat.

District	Bush	Gore	Representative
1st	57%	42%	Jack Kingston
2nd	54%	45%	Sanford Bishop
3rd	56%	42%	Mac Collins
4th	29%	69%	Cynthia McKinney
5th	23%	75%	John Lewis
6th	65%	32%	Johnny Isakson
7th	60%	38%	Bob Barr
8th	57%	42%	Saxby Chambliss
9th	69%	28%	Nathan Deal
10th	55%	44%	Charlie Norwood
11th	63%	34%	John Linder

== Electors ==
Technically the voters of Georgia cast their ballots for electors: representatives to the Electoral College. Georgia is allocated 13 electors because it has 11 congressional districts and two senators. All candidates who appear on the ballot or qualify to receive write-in votes must submit a list of 13 electors, who pledge to vote for their candidate and his or her running mate. Whoever wins the majority of votes in the state is awarded all 13 electoral votes. Their chosen electors then vote for president and vice president. Although electors are pledged to their candidate and running mate, they are not obligated to vote for them. An elector who votes for someone other than his or her candidate is known as a faithless elector.

The electors of each state and the District of Columbia met on December 18, 2000 to cast their votes for president and vice president. The Electoral College itself never meets as one body. Instead the electors from each state and the District of Columbia met in their respective capitols.

The following were the members of the Electoral College from the state. All were pledged to and voted for George W. Bush and Dick Cheney:

1. Anna Cablik
2. Teresa Jeter Chappell
3. Charles Commander Clay
4. Fred Cooper
5. James Edenfield
6. Winnie LeClercq
7. B.J. Lopez
8. Carolyn Dodgen Meadows
9. Alec Poitevint
10. Eric Tanenblatt
11. Cynthia Teasley
12. Virgil Williams
13. Bob Young
