= Carolyn D. Meadows =

President of the National Rifle Association

Carolyn Meadows
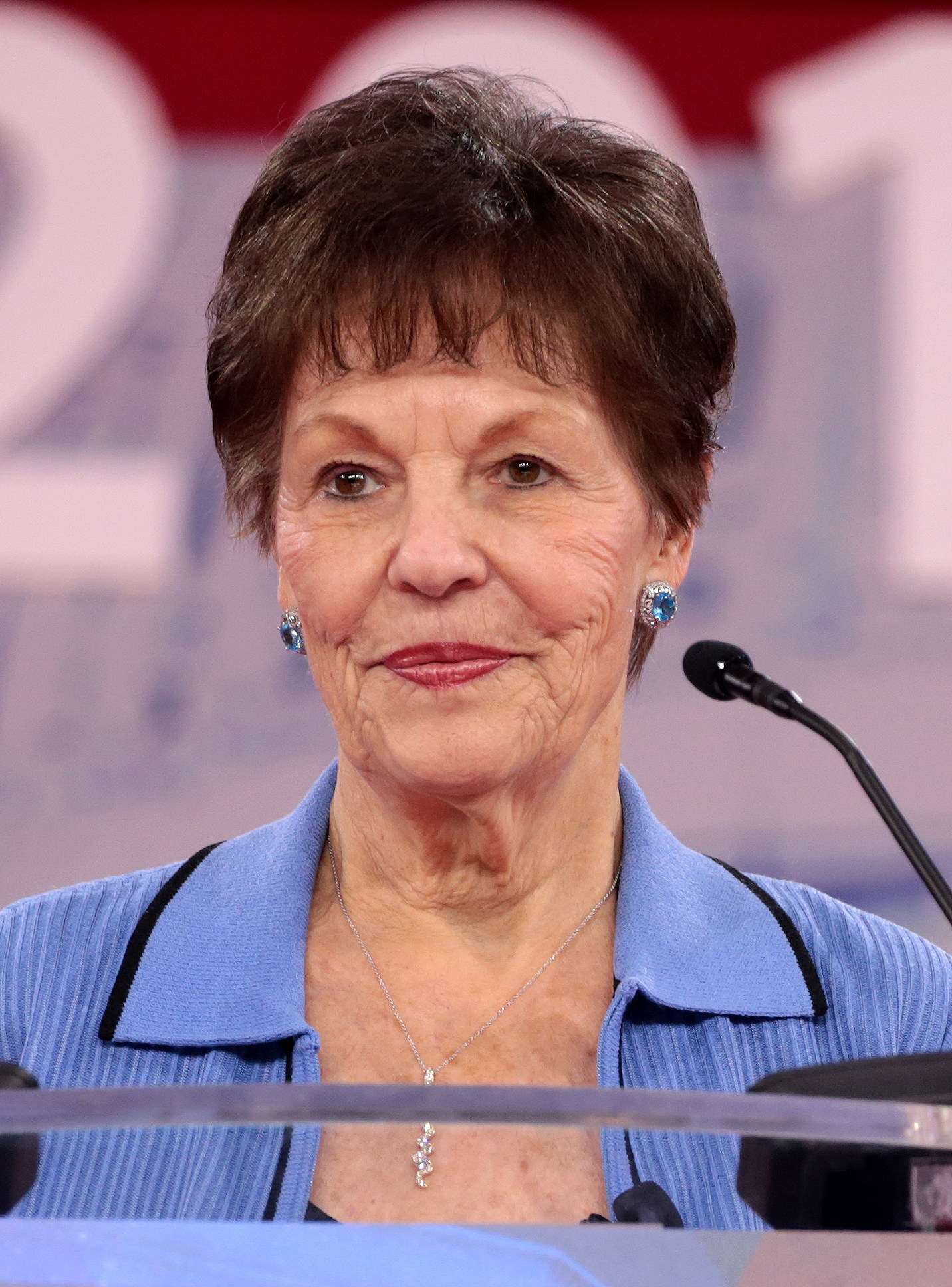

66th President of the National Rifle Association
- In office April 29, 2019 – October 1, 2021
- Preceded by: Oliver North
- Succeeded by: Charles L. Cotton

Personal details
- Born: Carolyn Dodgen; 1938 (age 87–88) Cobb County, Georgia, U.S.
- Party: Republican
- Children: 3
- Education: Georgia State University (BA)

Carolyn Dodgen Meadows (born Carolyn Dodgen, 1938) is an American conservative activist, who served as president of the National Rifle Association (NRA). She was elected the organization's president in April 2019, after then-president Oliver North resigned. She also serves as 2nd vice chairwoman of the American Conservative Union's board and as chairwoman of the Stone Mountain Memorial Association Board of Directors.

== Early life and education ==
Meadows was born and raised in Cobb County, Georgia. Her father was Roy N. Dodgen (after whom Dodgen Middle School is named) and her mother was Cleo (née Mabry) Dodgen. She graduated from Sprayberry High School in 1956, after which she attended Georgia State University.

== Career ==
Meadows served as a member of the Republican National Committee from Georgia, a role she first assumed in 1988. She joined the board of the National Rifle Association in 2003, and had served as its second vice president prior to being elected as president in 2019. Meadows worked at Lockheed Martin for 12 years as a buyer for the employee store.

In April 2019, Meadows said that Rep. Lucy McBath, a prominent advocate for gun control, only won election for Congress because she was a "minority female". Shortly after facing criticism, she apologized for the statement.

== Personal life ==
Meadows lives in Marietta, Georgia with her husband, Bob Meadows, with whom she has three sons and seven grandchildren.

National Rifle Association of America
| Preceded by Pete Brownell | President of the NRA; 2018 | Succeeded by Oliver North |
| Preceded by Oliver North | President of the NRA; 2019–present | Incumbent |
