= Sandra Froman =

American activist and lawyer (born 1949)

Sandra S. Froman

58th President of the National Rifle Association
- In office April, 2005 – April, 2007
- Preceded by: Kayne Robinson
- Succeeded by: John C. Sigler

Personal details
- Born: June 15, 1949 (age 76); San Francisco, California, U.S.
- Education: Stanford University (BA); Harvard Law School (JD)
- Occupation: Attorney, lobbyist
- Known for: former president of the National Rifle Association

Sandra S. "Sandy" Froman (born June 15, 1949) is an American author, attorney, professional speaker, and a past President of the National Rifle Association of America.

Froman was raised in the San Francisco Bay Area, California, earned a Bachelor of Arts degree in economics with distinction from Stanford University in 1971 and a Juris Doctor degree from Harvard Law School in 1974. She has been a practicing attorney since that time, has been a partner in three separate law firms and also taught at law school. Froman serves on the boards of the James E. Rogers College of Law at the University of Arizona, as well as Antonin Scalia Law School at George Mason University.

Froman is a member of the NRA Board of Directors, on which she has served since 1992, and the co-chair of the Tim Bee Congressional Exploratory Committee. In 2007, she was unanimously elected to a lifetime appointment on the NRA Executive Council. She is currently a practicing attorney and international speaker. Her contributions also appear on WorldNetDaily and Townhall.com. She served as 2nd Vice President of the NRA for five years under Charlton Heston, two years as 1st Vice President, and was elected to the NRA presidency in April 2005. She completed her second term in April 2007. The NRA Bylaws limit presidents to two terms(Heston was made an exception).

Froman speaks and writes regularly on the importance of the Second Amendment right to keep and bear arms. She portrays the NRA to be a civil rights organization that emphasizes the importance of the right of self-defense for women and minorities. She is an advocate for the appointment of judicial conservatives as federal judges, stressing the need for judges and Supreme Court justices that are faithful to the original meaning of the constitutional text and confine themselves to the judicial role of interpreting and applying the law faithfully, not using the courts to promote personal policy preferences or advance political agendas.

In May 2018, Mother Jones published an article alleging that Froman worked to buttress the racist genetic theories of Noble Laureate William Shockley while she was an undergraduate and then as a student at Harvard Law. Froman claimed that she had been the secretary of Shockley's wife. When confronted with publicly available recordings of her conversations with Shockley where she advised him about publicizing his theories, Froman said: “I have no recollection of any of this. It’s just too long ago.”

National Rifle Association of America
Preceded by Kayne Robinson	President of the NRA; 2005–2007	Succeeded by John C. Sigler
