= AR15.com =

Web forum for firearm-enthusiasts

- Website type: Web forum
- Available in: English
- Headquarters: Dallas/Fort Worth, Texas, {{{location_country}}}
- Owner: 2nd Adventure Group
- Founder: Edward Avila
- Website: ar15.com
- Commercial: Yes
- Users: 10 million (2013)
- Launched: 1996 (as mail list)
- Current status: Active

AR15.com is a firearm-enthusiast web forum founded as a mail list in 1996 and headquartered in the Dallas/Fort Worth area. It migrated to a bulletin board system, then finally a website which the owner called "the largest firearms website in the world", with 10 million users in 2013. The company that owned the website also manufactured AR-15 rifles and was founded in 1996 by Edward Avila, who moved it from Farmington, New York, to Texas after passage of the New York Secure Ammunition and Firearms Enforcement (SAFE) Act in 2013.

The forum was described by Politico as a significant "cyberspace" forum for discussion of the bump stock controversy in 2014. The website was the subject of confusion over a 2020 Canadian government ban on an airsoft gun, leading to a demand by 170,000 petitioners for an apology to gun owners.

It was bought in 2019 by 2nd Adventure Group, a holding company owned by Pete Brownell and Frank Brownell that also owns the online retailer Brownells.

== Removal from servers ==
The site's Domain Name System (DNS) registrar, GoDaddy, removed the site from its servers in 2021 following the U.S. Capitol attack. GoDaddy told Axios that the action was due to the site's failure to moderate content "that both promoted and encouraged violence".

The National Shooting Sports Foundation, in a message from its president, condemned what it called the "de-platforming of gun sites" as a "dark harbinger" for discussion of controversial issues and an "indiscriminate silencing of opinion and debate".

As of January 2021, the DNS registrar for the AR15.com domain is Epik.
