= Charles L. Cotton =

American attorney and gun rights advocate

Charles Cotton
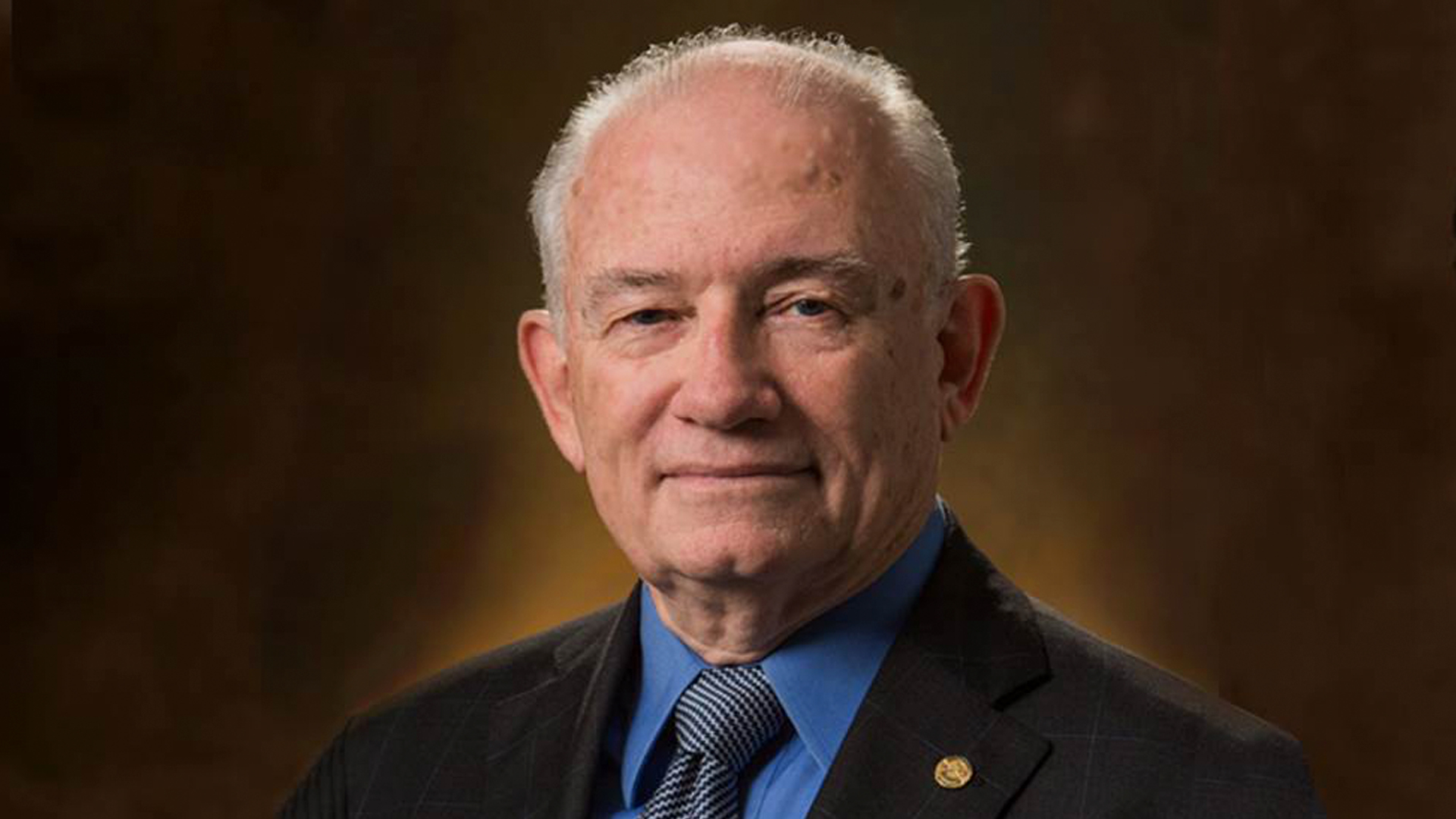

President of the National Rifle Association of America
- In office October 1, 2021 – May 21, 2024
- Preceded by: Carolyn D. Meadows
- Succeeded by: Bob Barr

Personal details
- Born: November 28, 1949 (age 76)
- Spouse: Martha Cotton
- Education: University of Houston (JD)

Charles L. Cotton (born November 28, 1949) is an American attorney and gun rights advocate who served as president of the National Rifle Association of America (NRA) from 2021 to 2024. Cotton is also the moderator of TexasCHLForum.com, an online discussion forum about gun ownership.

== Biography and education ==
Cotton grew up in Houston, Texas. Cotton stated that he "grew up hunting and plinking". He graduated with a Juris Doctor degree from the University of Houston in 1987.

== National Rifle Association career ==
Cotton is a trustee of the NRA's Civil Rights Defense Fund. He chaired the NRA’s audit committee from 2017 onwards. Cotton was elected President of the NRA in 2021, succeeding Carolyn D. Meadows. He was reelected President on May 30, 2022.

== TexasCHLForum.com ==
Cotton is the moderator of TexasCHLForum.com, a gun rights forum. In 2016, he was reportedly criticized by open carry activists, who accused him of being insufficiently supportive of gun rights.

=== Civil War comments ===
On a forum post, Cotton apparently lamented the loss of the Confederate States of America in the American Civil War, lamenting that it was “too bad we lost the civil war.” Cotton later posted that his view stemmed “purely from a states’ rights viewpoint and in light of the exponential growth of federal power after the war.”

=== Stoneman Douglas High School shooting comments ===
On a forum post, Cotton criticized efforts to enact gun control measures in the aftermath of the Stoneman Douglas High School shooting, arguing that advocates were unfairly using “the sympathy factor of kids getting killed.” In a post, Cotton stated:

“Wake up people and see what’s happening!!!! Bloomberg and Hollywood are pouring money into this effort and the media is helping to the fullest extent. We’ve never had this level of opposition before, not ever. It’s a campaign of lies and distortion, but it’s very well funded and they are playing on the sympathy factor of kids getting killed.”

== Personal life ==
He currently resides in Friendswood, Texas, with his wife Martha.
