= Bill Bachenberg =

American businessman

President of the National Rifle Association of America
- In office 2025–present
- Preceded by: Bob Barr

Personal details
- Party: Republican
- Spouse: Laura Bachenberg
- Occupation: Businessman

William A. Bachenberg is an American businessman, political activist and 2020 election denier. He has served as president of the National Rifle Association since 2025 and is involved in Republican Party politics in Pennsylvania.

Bachenberg founded DBSi in 1981, a systems storage company based in Allentown, which was acquired by a cybersecurity firm in 2012. Bachenberg has owned Lehigh Valley Sporting Clays since 2000.

Following the 2020 United States presidential election, Bachenberg became involved in efforts to investigate alleged voter fraud in several states, providing a $1 million line of credit trying to prove that the 2020 election was stolen. After commissioning a voting machine audit in Fulton County, Pennsylvania which failed to find evidence of election fraud, Bachenberg agreed to pay $500,000 to settle a federal lawsuit alleging he had refused to pay the cybersecurity firm involved in the work.

Also in 2020, Bachenberg served as chair of Pennsylvania's slate of fake electors pledged to Donald Trump. He was one of 14 individuals subpoenaed in 2022 by the January 6th Committee. He avoided criminal charges.

In 2025, Bachenberg ran for chair of the Pennsylvania Republican Party, ultimately losing to state senator Greg Rothman. Bachenberg was subsequently elected President of the National Rifle Association of America.
