= Bob Barr =

American attorney and politician (born 1948)

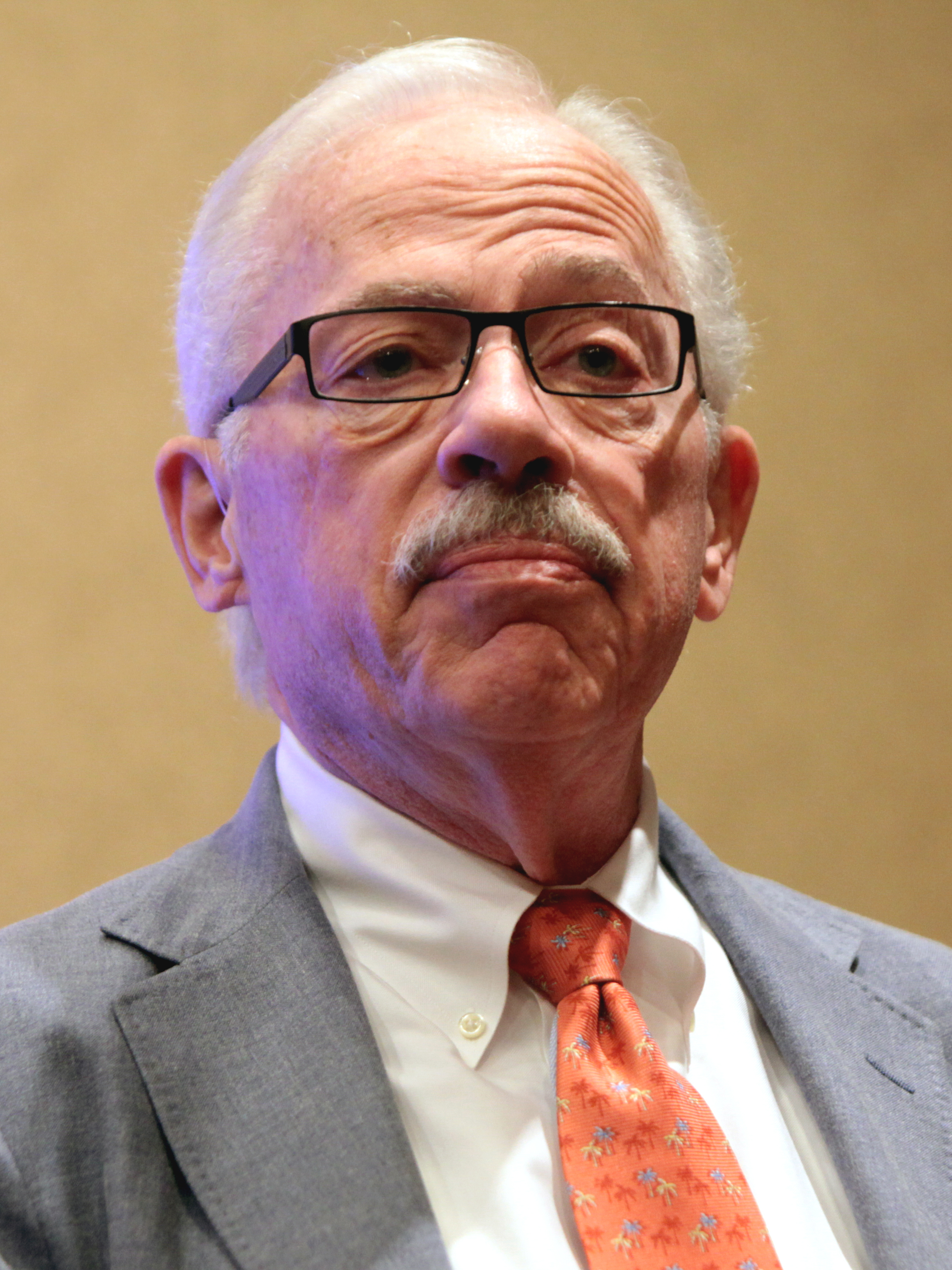
- Barr in 2016

68th President of the National Rifle Association
- In office May 21, 2024 – May 2025
- Preceded by: Charles L. Cotton
- Succeeded by: Bill Bachenberg

Member of the U.S. House of Representatives from Georgia's 7th district
- In office January 3, 1995 – January 3, 2003
- Preceded by: Buddy Darden
- Succeeded by: John Linder

United States Attorney for the Northern District of Georgia
- In office 1986–1990
- Appointed by: Ronald Reagan
- Preceded by: Larry Thompson
- Succeeded by: Joe Whitley

Personal details
- Born: Robert Laurence Barr Jr. November 5, 1948 (age 78) Iowa City, Iowa, U.S.
- Party: Republican (1970–2004, 2011–present); Independent (2004–2006); Libertarian (2006–2011)
- Spouses: Gail Barr (m. 1976; div. 1986); Jeri Dobbin (m. 1986)
- Children: 4
- Education: University of Southern California (BA); George Washington University (MA); Georgetown University (JD)

Robert Laurence Barr Jr. (born November 5, 1948) is an American attorney and politician. He served as a U.S. Representative from 1995 to 2003, representing Georgia's 7th congressional district as a Republican. He later became the Libertarian Party's nominee in the 2008 United States presidential election and served as president of the National Rifle Association (NRA) from 2024 to 2025.

Barr was born in Iowa and raised in a military family, spending much of his childhood overseas. He holds degrees from the University of Southern California, George Washington University and Georgetown University Law Center. Prior to entering politics he worked as a CIA analyst and attorney, before serving as U.S. Attorney for the Northern District of Georgia from 1986 to 1990. Barr won election to the U.S. House of Representatives in 1994. During his time in the House of Representatives, he authored the Defense of Marriage Act, which was later overturned by the Supreme Court in 2013 and repealed by the 117th Congress through a bill supported by Barr. He also attained national prominence as one of the leaders of the impeachment of President Bill Clinton.

After his congressional defeat in 2002, Barr joined the Libertarian Party in 2006. and served on its National Committee. He was the party's presidential nominee in 2008, running alongside Wayne Allyn Root. Barr announced his return to the Republican Party in 2011 and was defeated in a Republican primary for Georgia's 11th congressional district in 2014. He was named president of the NRA in 2024, serving for one year, and had previously served on the organisation's board from 2001 to 2007.

== Early life ==
Barr was born in Iowa City, Iowa, to Robert Laurence Barr and Beatrice Barr. His father, a career military officer who had graduated from West Point, was stationed in various locations around the world while pursuing his career in civil engineering.

The second of six children, Bob Jr. lived as a boy in Malaysia, Pakistan, Panama, Peru, Baghdad, and finally Tehran, Iran, where he graduated from Community High School in 1966.

He returned to the United States for college, attending the University of Southern California. There he joined the Tau Kappa Epsilon fraternity in 1967. He was elected to the position of Grand Prytanis on the fraternity's Grand Council, serving from 2013 to 2015.

During college, Barr's mother introduced him to the work of writer Ayn Rand. This fostered a newfound appreciation for conservatism and prompted Barr to join the Young Trojan Republican Club. He completed his B.A., cum laude, from the University of Southern California (USC) in 1970. He married his first wife while still in college. They divorced in 1976.

=== Early career ===
Barr continued in graduate school, earning a master's degree in International Affairs from George Washington University's Elliott School of International Affairs in 1972. He next earned his J.D. from Georgetown University Law Center (attending at night) in 1977. From 1971 to 1978, Barr worked for the Central Intelligence Agency (CIA) as an analyst of Latin American issues.

Barr married his second wife, Gail, in 1976. They have two children. Gail and Bob Barr divorced in 1986.

After leaving the CIA, Barr moved to northern Georgia. He practiced law and became active in the Republican Party, serving as county chair. Barr made an unsuccessful bid for the Georgia House of Representatives in 1984.

In 1986, Barr married his third wife, Jerilyn Dobbins, who was later known as Jeri Barr. Barr's website stated in 2008 that he and Jeri have four children and six grandchildren.

In 1986, Barr was appointed by President Ronald Reagan to serve as U.S. Attorney for the Northern District of Georgia – a post Barr held until 1990. His office prosecuted state and local officials, members of the Medellin drug cartel, and got a perjury indictment on then-sitting Republican Congressman Pat Swindall, who ultimately served a year in prison on the charges. From 1990 to 1991, Barr was president of the Southeastern Legal Foundation., an Atlanta-based law firm and policy center that litigates in support of "limited government, individual economic freedom, and the free enterprise system".

== Congressional career ==
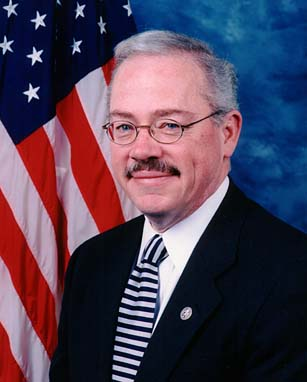
Barr during the 107th Congress (2001–2003)

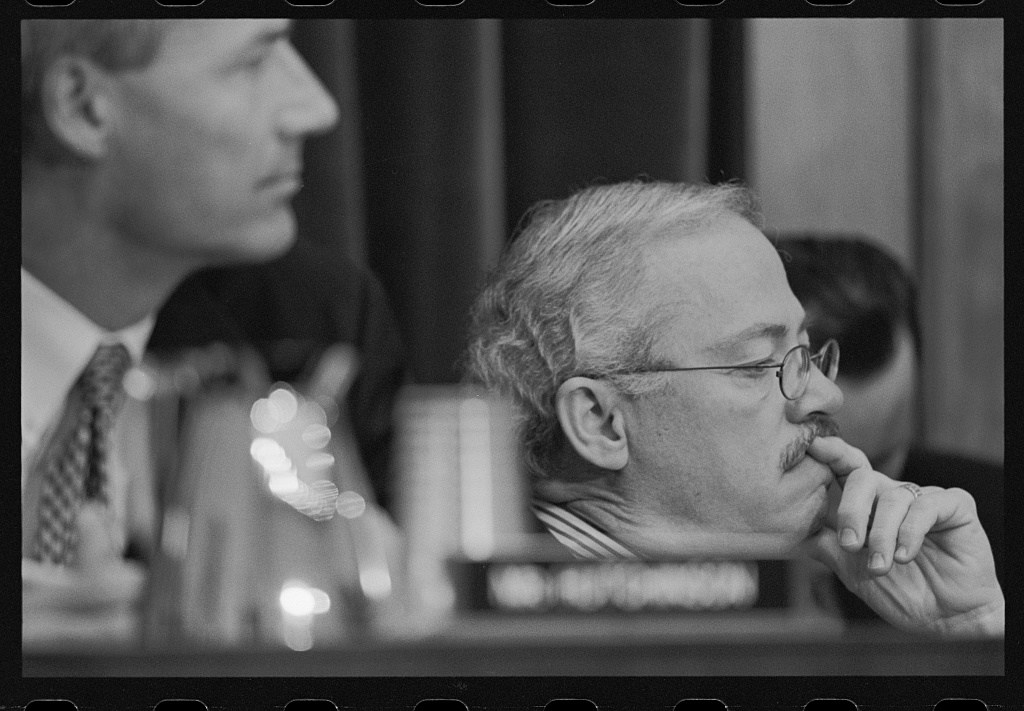
Barr listening during a House Judiciary Committee hearing about the investigation of President Bill Clinton's relationship with Monica Lewinsky in 1998

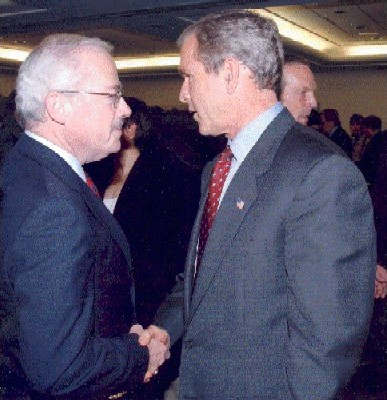
Barr greeting President George W. Bush in 2002

Barr sought the Republican Party nomination for U.S. Senate in 1992, but lost the primary election to Paul Coverdell. The primary was very close, with Barr losing by fewer than 1,600 votes in a runoff election. Subsequently, Coverdell came in behind incumbent Senator Wyche Fowler in the general election, but the 3% showing by a Libertarian candidate (Jim Hudson) forced a runoff, which Coverdell won.

Barr was elected to the U.S. House of Representatives in 1994 as a Republican, upsetting six-term Democrat Buddy Darden, to represent Georgia's 7th congressional district in the 104th United States Congress. Barr was one of 73 Republican freshmen ushered into Congress in that election. The election became known as the "Republican Revolution" because it resulted in the first Republican House majority in 40 years – since the 1955 adjournment of the 83rd Congress.

After a Federal Election Commission audit of his 1994 and 1996 campaigns, Barr paid a $28,000 fine for illegal campaign payments.

Barr was later re-elected three times, serving from 1995 to 2003. While in Congress, Barr served as a senior member of the Judiciary Committee, as vice-chairman of the Government Reform Committee, and as a member of the Committee on Financial Services and the Committee on Veteran's Affairs.

In Congress, Barr became famous for his "dour" image and told constituents, "You don't send me to Washington to smile." He also said in a radio interview, "If it's not in the Constitution, I won't smile." He later explained "I don't consider politicians who smile to be worth a heck of a lot... all things considered, it doesn't make a dime's worth of difference if the politicians in Washington smile or not, what matters is how much of your hard-earned dollars they take to spend in pure pork." Barr said in 2010, "I can see a situation where the federal government is going to bring an entire suitcase of San Francisco values to the American family, and while I would love to explain all the things that are wrong with that, the fact is that this is a corrupting, left-leaning, influence on a section of society that so many liberal elites want to see taken out of the 'red state' column. The only solution to this kind of behavior is dour and austere social conservatism, like my own." Adding to his image, Barr has frequently protested about "cult hairstyles", saying "I cannot abide by people who adopt a cult hairstyle, or persistently dress inappropriately for meetings with me."

Georgia's congressional districts were reorganized by the Democratic-controlled Georgia legislature ahead of the 2002 elections for the 108th Congress. As part of the legislature's effort to get more Democrats elected from the state, Barr's district was renumbered as the 11th District and made significantly more Democratic. A large slice of his base was drawn into the same district as fellow Republican John Linder. The new district was numerically Barr's district – the 7th – but contained most of the territory from Linder's old 11th District. This move profited Democrats by leading to the inevitable defeat of an incumbent Republican (i.e., either Barr or Linder). Recognizing Barr's precarious situation, the Libertarian Party seized on the opportunity to oust one of the federal drug war's most vocal proponents (Barr), and ran TV ads criticizing Barr's opposition to medical marijuana during the Republican primaries. Barr was soundly defeated by a 2-to-1 margin. Before the medical marijuana ads were aired, the Linder campaign acknowledged the race as being tight; and Pat Gartland, southeastern director of the U.S. Chamber of Commerce, called it "too close to call".

Barr's defeat was applauded by many Democrats and Libertarians. Rob Kampia of the Marijuana Policy Project called it "glorious news". Ron Crickenberger, the Libertarian Party's political director and producer of the TV ads, was quick to warn other supporters of the war on drugs:

With this victory, we have fired a warning shot for every drug warrior in Congress to hear. And any member of Congress – Democrat or Republican – who introduces legislation to make federal drug laws even more oppressive could be next on our list.

However, some individuals within these groups lamented Barr's defeat as a setback for privacy rights and libertarian causes in general. J. Bradley Jansen, vice chair of the Libertarian Party in the District of Columbia, opined:

The LP has a historic opportunity to present itself as a viable alternative to the big parties, instead of spending its money and energy trying to defeat one of libertarianism's few friends in Congress just because they disagree with him on one issue.

=== Political positions in Congress ===
During his tenure, Barr was regarded as one of the most conservative members of Congress. In 2002, he was described by Bill Shipp in an OnlineAthens.com article as "the idol of the gun-toting, abortion-fighting, IRS-hating hard right wing of American politics". However, Barr's criticism of the Bush administration's policies on privacy and other civil liberties after the 9/11 attacks was unusual among House Republicans (see Criticism of Bush Administration below). This criticism earned Barr other labels such as "Maverick", "Jekyll-and-Hyde", and "Libertarian".

==== Gun ownership ====
Barr is a staunch proponent of gun rights, and is opposed to any and all efforts to restrict the ownership of guns.

During the 2002 race, a supporter handed Barr an antique pistol during a fundraiser at a private home. The gun went off in Barr's hands, though no one was injured.

==== War on drugs ====
Barr was originally a strong supporter of the war on drugs, reflecting his previous experience as an Anti-Drug Coordinator for the United States Department of Justice. While in Congress, he was a member of the Speaker's Task Force for a Drug-Free America. This task force was established in 1998 by then-Speaker Newt Gingrich to "design a World War II-style victory plan to save America's children from illegal drugs." The task force crafted legislation specifically designed to "win the war on drugs by 2002".

Barr advocated complete federal prohibition of medical marijuana. In 1998, he successfully blocked implementation of Initiative 59 – the "Legalization of Marijuana for Medical Treatment Initiative of 1998" – which would have legalized medical marijuana in Washington, D.C. The "Barr Amendment" to the 1999 Omnibus spending bill not only blocked implementation of Initiative 59, but also prohibited the vote tally from even being released. Nearly a year passed before a lawsuit filed by the American Civil Liberties Union eventually revealed the initiative had received 69 percent of the vote. In response to the judge's ruling, Barr simply attached another "Barr Amendment" to the 2000 Omnibus spending bill that overturned Initiative 59 outright. The Barr Amendment also prohibited future laws that would "decrease the penalties for marijuana or other Schedule I drugs" in Washington, D.C. This preemptively blocked future attempts by Marijuana Policy Project (MPP) to reform marijuana laws in DC via the initiative process. In March 2002, U.S. District Judge Emmet Sullivan struck down this portion of the Barr Amendment as being an unconstitutional restriction on free speech. Barr's response to the ruling was defiant:

Clearly, the court today has ignored the constitutional right and responsibility of Congress to pass laws protecting citizens from dangerous and addictive narcotics, and the right of Congress to exert legislative control over the District of Columbia as the nation's capital.
— Bob Barr, March 28, 2002

The federal government later prevailed on appeal, reinstating the Barr Amendment just in time to thwart MPP's initiative 63 – "The Medical Marijuana Initiative of 2002" – which had already qualified for the November 2002 ballot. In 2009, both the United States Senate and House of Representatives voted to lift the ban against a medical marijuana initiative, effectively overturning the Barr Amendment.

Barr later reversed his position on medical marijuana, joining MPP as a lobbyist five years later. In a June 4, 2008, interview with Stephen Colbert on the Colbert Report, Barr confirmed that he now supports ending marijuana prohibition, as well as the war on drugs, for which he once vehemently fought. In 2009, he was hired by the MPP to lobby to overturn the amendment that he had authored, an effort which was ultimately successful.

==== Same-sex marriage ====
Barr took a lead in legislative debate concerning same-sex marriage. He wrote and sponsored the Defense of Marriage Act (DOMA), a law enacted in 1996 which states that only marriages that are between a man and a woman can be federally recognized, and individual states may choose not to recognize a same-sex marriage performed in another state. At the 2008 Libertarian National Convention, he apologized for the part of DOMA which prevents the federal government from recognizing same-sex marriages.

He now supports same-sex marriage and opposed the Federal Marriage Amendment, having contended that it is a violation of states' rights. Before the United States Supreme Court mandated recognition of same-sex marriage in Obergefell v. Hodges, Barr supported the Respect for Marriage Act, which would have repealed the Defense of Marriage Act.

==== Terrorism ====
He voted for the first USA PATRIOT Act, but only after his amendments adding "sunset clauses" were added to the final bill. Barr played a similar role during the debate over Bill Clinton's Comprehensive Anti-Terrorism Act of 1995, crafting pro-civil liberties amendments to the original text. He now publicly regrets his Patriot Act vote.

==== War in Iraq ====
In 2002, Barr voted for the Iraq Resolution. He has since called for withdrawal of U.S. forces from Iraq, leaving no permanent military bases. A press release from Barr's presidential campaign stated: "The next president should commit to a speedy and complete withdrawal from Iraq, and tell the Iraqi people that the U.S. troops will be going home."

==== Religious freedom ====
In Congress, he also proposed that the Pentagon ban the practice of Wicca in the military.

==== Economic freedom ====
Barr advocates the repeal of the 16th Amendment, which gives the U.S. Congress the power to levy an income tax without apportionment. As an alternative, he proposes a form of consumption tax, such as the FairTax.

He also favors drastic reductions in government spending and the elimination of corporate welfare.

=== Waco hearings ===
The National Review described Barr as one of the few people able to "ask effective questions and make clear points" while questioning government witnesses during the 1995 House Waco siege hearings on the Bureau of Alcohol, Tobacco, Firearms and Explosives and Federal Bureau of Investigation actions against the Branch Davidians in 1993, sponsored by subcommittees of the House Judiciary Committee and Government Reform and Oversight Committee. Barr has written: "The hearing was a farce: a virtual lovefest, during which members of the Clinton Administration responded to softball questions from their colleagues in the House with superficial answers, and Republican queries were ignored or glossed over with disdain, if not outright contempt." Barr called for Congress to reopen investigations, but senior House Republicans refused. In 2003 testimony submitted to the U.S. Senate Judiciary Committee, Barr wrote: "[T]here remains time to turn back the constitutional clock and roll back excessive post-9/11 powers before we turn the corner into another Japanese internment or, closer to our own experiences, before we witness a legally sanctioned Ruby Ridge or Waco scenario."

=== Controversies over Barr's personal conduct ===
In the early 1990s, Barr was photographed at a fundraising event licking whipped cream off a woman. According to The Washington Post, "Two people who observed the act say it wasn't exactly a bosom lick but more like a neckline lick, at the sort of event where business and civic leaders perform dares to raise money. 'Not exactly Mr. Effusive,' says Matt Towery, the former chairman of Newt Gingrich's political organization, who observed the brief and awkward licking. 'You can hardly get the guy to smile.'"

=== Role in Clinton impeachment ===
Barr is best known for his role as one of the House managers during President Bill Clinton's impeachment trial.

In the spring of 1997, Republican, Bob Barr wrote House Committee on the Judiciary chairman Henry Hyde, encouraging him to open an impeachment inquiry. Hyde responded that such an action would be premature.

In November 1997, Barr first introduced a resolution directing the House Judiciary Committee to begin an impeachment inquiry against Clinton, with this resolution coming months before the Monica Lewinsky scandal came to light. This resolution, introduced in November 1997 did not specify any charges or allegations. Foremost among the concerns Barr cited at the time was apparent obstruction of Justice Department investigations into Clinton campaign fundraising from foreign sources, chiefly the People's Republic of China. Barr argued that Clinton had been "systematically operating outside the bounds" of the law. He accused Clinton of "systematic abuse of office", alleging campaign finance law violations and obstruction of congressional investigations. Eighteen other Republican members of the House of Representatives joined Barr in signing on to the resolution as co-sponsors. These members were Roscoe Bartlett, Helen Chenoweth, Barbara Cubin, John Doolittle, Lindsey Graham, Duncan L. Hunter, Sam Johnson, Jack Kingston, Jack Metcalf, John Mica, Ron Paul, Dana Rohrabacher, Pete Sessions, Chris Smith, Mark Souder, Linda Smith, Bob Stump, and Todd Tiahrt.

After the Lewinsky scandal broke, Barr was the first lawmaker in either chamber to call for Clinton's resignation. After the Clinton–Lewinsky scandal came to light, Barr ramped up his efforts to push for Clinton's impeachment, appearing regularly on television, as well as even publishing a scholarly article in the Texas Law Review on the subject.

During debate on the 1998 impeachment resolution on the House floor, Barr argued that Clinton's attempt to interfere with Lewinsky's testimony in the Paula Jones case endangered the Constitution. In doing so, Barr said, Clinton violated what Barr called a "fundamental right" of any American citizen – "the unshakable right each one of us has to walk into a courtroom and demand the righting of a wrong."

In 1999, during Clinton's impeachment trial, Hustler publisher Larry Flynt offered money to anyone who could provide evidence about prominent Republicans who had engaged in an extramarital affair. According to the American Journalism Review, investigators for Flynt said that Barr was "guilty of king-size hypocrisy." Flynt subsequently paid a sum of money to Barr's second wife, Gail Barr, after she had sworn an affidavit stating Barr had not dissuaded her from having an abortion, and Barr drove her to the abortion clinic for the procedure. Investigators reported that Bob Barr then "invoked a legal privilege from his 1985 divorce proceeding so he could refuse to answer questions on whether he'd cheated on his second wife with the woman who is now his third" (Jerilyn).

== Criticism of Bush Administration ==
A man faithful to the Constitution doesn't stop criticizing presidents when the letter after their names change.

— Bob Barr, 2007

Since leaving Congress in 2003, Barr has become a vocal opponent of the Patriot Act and has stated that he voted for it reluctantly and regrets voting for it, only agreeing because the Bush administration promised not to attempt to expand the granted powers or use them for non-terrorism purposes, and the administration agreed to report to Congress on their usage. Barr says that the Bush administration promptly ignored these three promises given to Congress and has used the powers granted from the Patriot Act to further erode due process of law even in matters unrelated to terrorism. Barr claims that the Clinton administration did much of the same thing. In 2005 – the year the Patriot Act was due for renewal – Barr helped found an organization called Patriots to Restore Checks and Balances, a bipartisan group dedicated to eliminating aspects of the Patriot Act that could potentially affect law-abiding citizens rather than terrorists, and to "restore traditional checks and balances on government power so the country can effectively fight terror without sacrificing the rights of innocent Americans, rights that are guaranteed by the Constitution." Barr still serves as the group's chairman.

Barr has been a vocal opponent of President George W. Bush's claim of authorization to wiretap transnational phone calls without individual judicial license. He has said, "What's wrong with it is several-fold. One, it's bad policy for our government to be spying on American citizens through the National Security Agency. Secondly, it's bad to be spying on Americans without court oversight. And thirdly, it's bad to be spying on Americans apparently in violation of federal laws against doing it without court order."

In 2006, he debated the architect of the Patriot Act, Viet Dinh, on terrorism and privacy issues.

=== Departure from Republican Party ===
In the 2004 presidential election, Barr left the Republican Party and publicly endorsed the Libertarian Party presidential nominee Michael Badnarik.

In 2006, he joined the Libertarian Party as a regional representative, then serving on the Libertarian National Committee.

== Political associations ==
Barr sat on the board of directors of the National Rifle Association of America from 2001 to 2007. He became president of the group in May 2024.

Barr is a commentator on political and social issues and is chairman of the American Conservative Union Foundation's '21st Century Center for Privacy and Freedom'.

In January 2006, to emphasize the bipartisan nature of the event, Barr planned on introducing Al Gore at a speech co-sponsored by the Liberty Coalition and the American Constitution Society for Law and Policy to address what they called the "NSA Spying Scandal", in which Gore compared warrantless wiretapping to the FBI's illegal COINTELPRO project surveilling, discrediting and disrupting Martin Luther King Jr.

=== Libertarian Party ===
On December 12, 2006, Barr became a regional representative on the Libertarian National Committee, representing the Party's Southeast Region. Barr said: "I'm happy to announce that I am now a proud, card-carrying Libertarian who is committed to helping elect leaders who will strive for smaller government, lower taxes and abundant individual freedom."

=== Marijuana Policy Project ===
Regarding the drug war, I've been there, done that, and know firsthand our current strategy is not working. Continuing to have the federal government run roughshod over the states, even if the citizens of a state decide they wish to legalize medicinal marijuana, for example, is wrong.

— Bob Barr, May 22, 2008

In Congress, Barr's strong stance against medical marijuana put him at odds with marijuana policy reformers such as the Marijuana Policy Project (MPP). Despite this historic antagonism, in March 2007, Barr reversed his stance on medical marijuana and began lobbying on behalf of MPP. This new partnership saw Barr working to repeal his very own "Barr Amendment" – the amendment that overturned a voter-approved medical marijuana initiative in Washington, D.C., and bars consideration of similar initiatives.

Barr has been careful to state that he isn't pro-drug, but rather against government intrusion.

Barr's reversal on drug policy surprised many, particularly MPP. His new-found appreciation for harm reduction was heartily welcomed:

It's very rare to find someone who's willing to change their position and then be so public about it. [Barr has] definitely increased the credibility of the Marijuana Policy Project. People have to take us seriously when we walk through the door with Bob Barr.
— Rob Kampia, Executive Director, Marijuana Policy Project, May 2008

=== American Freedom Agenda ===
Barr is one of the four founders of the American Freedom Agenda, which is described as "a coalition established to restore checks and balances and civil liberties protections under assault by the executive branch." The American Freedom Agenda has established a 10-point Freedom Pledge for presidential candidates to confirm their commitment to civil liberties. He is also a member of the Constitution Project's bipartisan Liberty and Security Committee.

=== Liberty Guard ===
Barr is chairman of the board of directors of Liberty Guard, an IRS 501(c)4 organization, which states its mission is to protect and defend individual liberty.

=== National Popular Vote ===
Barr is a supporter of the National Popular Vote Interstate Compact.

== Other activities ==
In early 2008, Barr became an adjunct professor at Kennesaw State University and was scheduled to teach a course on privacy rights titled "Privacy and Public Policy in 21st Century Business and Society."

Barr appeared in the mock documentary Borat: Cultural Learnings of America for Make Benefit Glorious Nation of Kazakhstan. In his scene, he met with "Borat Sagdiyev" (portrayed by Sacha Baron Cohen) in the United States Capitol. Borat gave him cheese described as being made from Borat's wife's breast milk.

Barr endorsed the Free State Project on July 22, 2008, saying, "I think it's tremendous!"

Barr is listed as the President of the Law Enforcement Education Organization, a non-profit organization with a mission of serving "active-duty and retired law enforcement officers, by educating and assisting law enforcement personnel and agencies meet challenges posed by certain laws and regulations."

=== Publications and commentary ===
Barr wrote The Meaning of Is: The Squandered Impeachment and Wasted Legacy of William Jefferson Clinton (published in 2004). He briefly wrote a regular column for Creative Loafing (Atlanta), an alternative weekly newspaper serving the Atlanta metropolitan area.

In 2008, Barr hosted a political talk radio show on Radio America called Bob Barr's Laws of the Universe. He has said that he plans to write a book with that title.

In August 2008, Barr published an opinion piece in The Washington Times that criticized the United States' response to the conflict between Russia and Georgia as being too emotional and not based on legitimate American national security concerns. He wrote: "The most important American interest is defending America; and intervening on behalf of Georgia against Russia has nothing to do with defending America." In October 2008, Barr gave a one-hour talk at Carnegie Mellon University, allowing time to take audience questions. This was one of numerous lectures for which he was paid.

In 2008, in an Op-Ed article published in The Atlanta Journal-Constitution, Barr lambasted the new policy of Boston, Massachusetts, police to allow warrantless search for firearms in teenagers' homes. On March 7, 2009, The Atlanta Journal-Constitution announced that Barr would be a weekly columnist for the paper. His blog is known as The Barr Code.

=== Advising Jean-Claude Duvalier ===
In 2011, Barr traveled to Haiti to lobby on behalf of "former Haitian dictator Jean-Claude "Baby Doc" Duvalier." According to Barr, "he is not serving as Duvalier's attorney, but is in Port-au-Prince to consult, assist and be Duvalier's voice to the international community."

== 2008 presidential campaign ==
In early 2008, rumors circulated that Barr was considering a presidential run under the Libertarian Party banner. Activists began a Facebook group dedicated to drafting Barr into the nomination contest, and Barr later confirmed his interest. He launched a presidential exploratory committee and campaign website on April 5, and formally announced his candidacy for the Libertarian nomination on May 12. His announcement came a mere ten days before the start of the Libertarian Party Convention, where delegates select the presidential candidate.

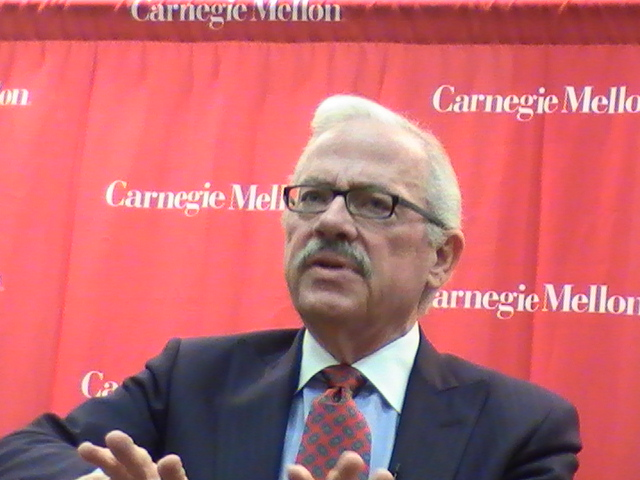
Bob Barr speaks in October 2008.

Following his announcement, Rasmussen Reports had Barr polling at 6% nationwide against Barack Obama (42%), John McCain (38%), and Ralph Nader (4%). The study identified Barr as the Libertarian candidate, but most voters said they did not know enough about him to have an opinion of him personally. Barr's support in the poll was a net drain on Republicans; he picked up 7% of the Republican vote, 5% of the Democratic vote, and 5% of the unaffiliated vote.

On May 25, 2008, Barr became the 2008 Libertarian presidential nominee after six rounds of voting at the 2008 Libertarian convention. He beat Mary Ruwart in the final round of voting, with 324 delegates to Ruwart's 276, with 26 none-of-the-above votes. Barr had received the endorsement of Wayne Allyn Root, one of his rivals for the nomination, after Root was eliminated following the fifth round of balloting. Barr, in turn, endorsed Root for the party's vice presidential nomination, which he received. Reason magazine senior editor Radley Balko called Barr "the first serious candidate the LP has run since I've been eligible to vote."

On June 4, 2008, Barr invited the Republican Party's presumptive presidential nominee, John McCain, and the Democratic Party's presumptive presidential nominee, Barack Obama, to weekly presidential debates through an official press release.

Many opinion leaders predicted that Barr could siphon off conservative votes that would have otherwise gone to McCain. John Linder, who defeated Barr for the Republican nomination in a 2002 congressional race, said that Barr could cause serious problems for McCain in some states. Barr repeatedly rejected this assertion as scapegoating, responding that small-government Republicans would not vote for McCain anyway, nor would civil liberties advocates vote for Obama.

Barr appeared on the ballot in 45 states. In July, he filed a lawsuit against Oklahoma for its unusually restrictive ballot access laws, which he contends are contrary to the First Amendment right to petition one's government for a redress of grievances. In July, a Zogby poll had Barr receiving 6% of the vote nationwide, as well as double digits in several states.

A Zogby poll released on August 15, 2008, indicated that most Republican and Democratic voters wanted Barr to be included in the presidential debates. The poll also indicated that almost 70% of independent voters would have liked to see him included.

On September 17, 2008, Barr filed suit in Texas to remove both McCain and Obama from the ballot. Both political parties failed to file their nominees by the deadline. On September 23, 2008, the Texas Supreme Court rejected the request without giving a reason for its decision.

Among his campaign positions, Barr distinguished himself strongly from Obama and McCain by opposing the financial bailout bill.

On November 4, 2008, Barr received 523,686 votes, 0.4% of the national vote.

== Return to Republican Party ==
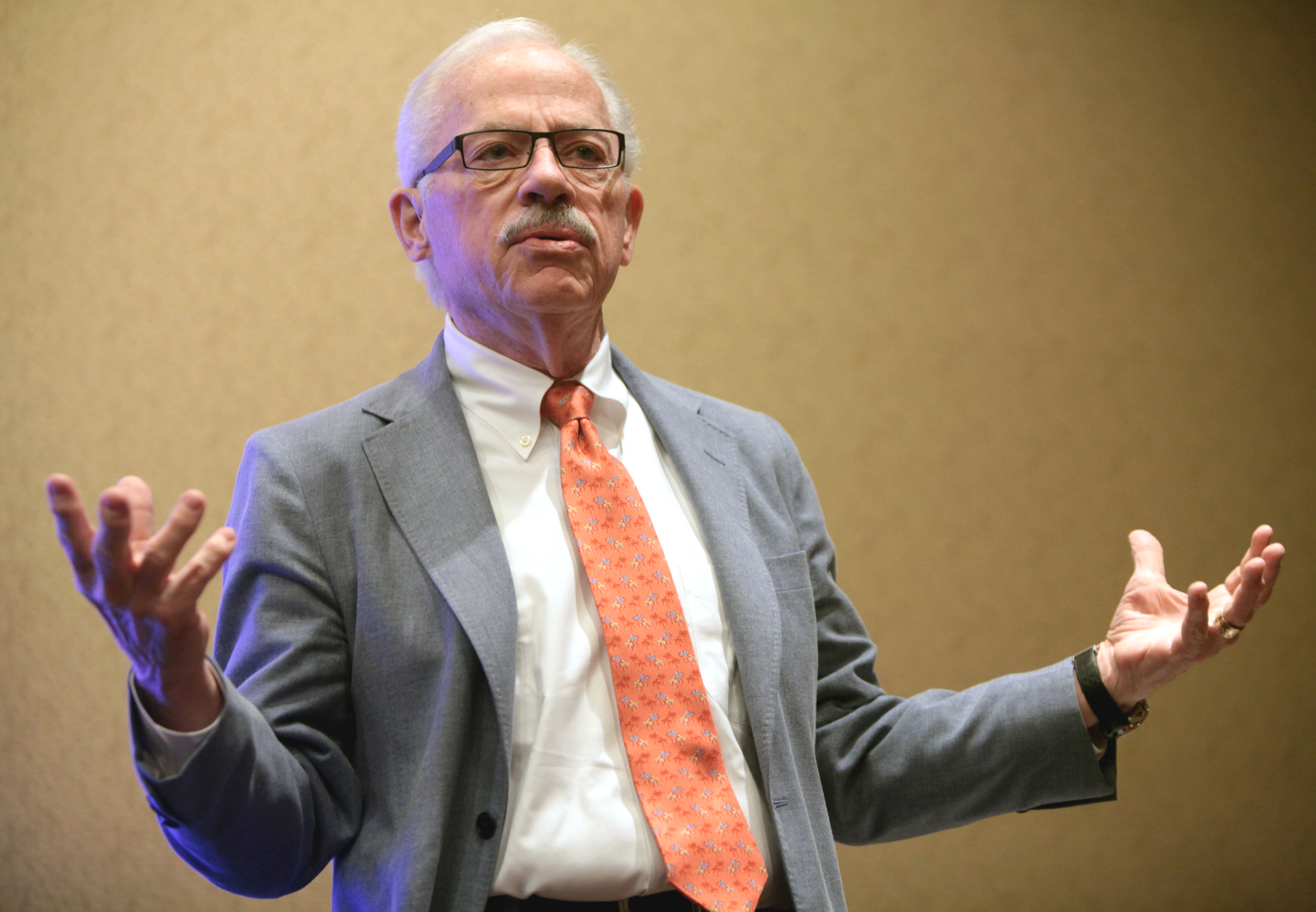
Barr speaking at the 2016 FreedomFest in Las Vegas, Nevada

Following his statement that he would not challenge the Republican incumbent in the 2012 primary race for Georgia's 14th congressional district, he subsequently indicated his return to the Republican Party and support for 2012 GOP congressional candidates when stating – "Our country is at a serious cross-roads, without question we need new leadership in the White House, and a part of that turnaround in 2012 will be solid GOP majorities in both chambers of Congress."

=== Aborted 2012 congressional campaign ===
Barr had expressed interest in running for Congress again as a Republican in 2012, challenging incumbent Republican Tom Graves in Georgia's 14th district. The newly created district included Floyd and Paulding counties, which were part of the territory Barr represented in his first congressional stint. Between them, they made up 38 percent of the 14th's population. Barr has lived in Smyrna, in Cobb County, for many years, but told several friends he planned to move to Paulding County in order to challenge Graves. Despite strong polling numbers, Barr chose to abandon his plans for running, citing concern on the potential impact it would have on his law firm and family.

=== 2014 congressional campaign ===
Barr held a news conference on March 28, 2013, at Adventure Outdoors in Smyrna, Georgia, where he announced his upcoming run for his old congressional seat, the 11th. The seat had come open after his successor, Phil Gingrey, gave it up to run for the Senate. Barr was vying to become the first Georgia Republican to return to the U.S. House after a gap in service. Barr placed second in his six-way House primary with 26% of the vote. State Senator Barry Loudermilk, who was backed by the Senate Conservatives Fund, placed first in the primary with 37%. Since no candidate won at least 50% (plus 1) of the vote, a runoff took place on July 22, 2014. Barr lost the runoff to Loudermilk by a nearly 2:1 margin.

== NRA career ==
On May 20, 2024, Bob Barr was elected by the National Rifle Association Board of Directors as NRA President.

U.S. House of Representatives
Preceded by Buddy Darden	Member of the U.S. House of Representatives from Georgia's 7th congressional district 1995–2003	Succeeded by John Linder
Party political offices
Preceded by Michael Badnarik	Libertarian nominee for President of the United States; 2008	Succeeded by Gary Johnson
U.S. order of precedence (ceremonial)
Preceded by Mike Ferguson as Former U.S. Representative	Order of precedence of the United States as Former U.S. Representative	Succeeded by Jim Marshall as Former U.S. Representative
