= Oliver North =

American military figure (born 1943)

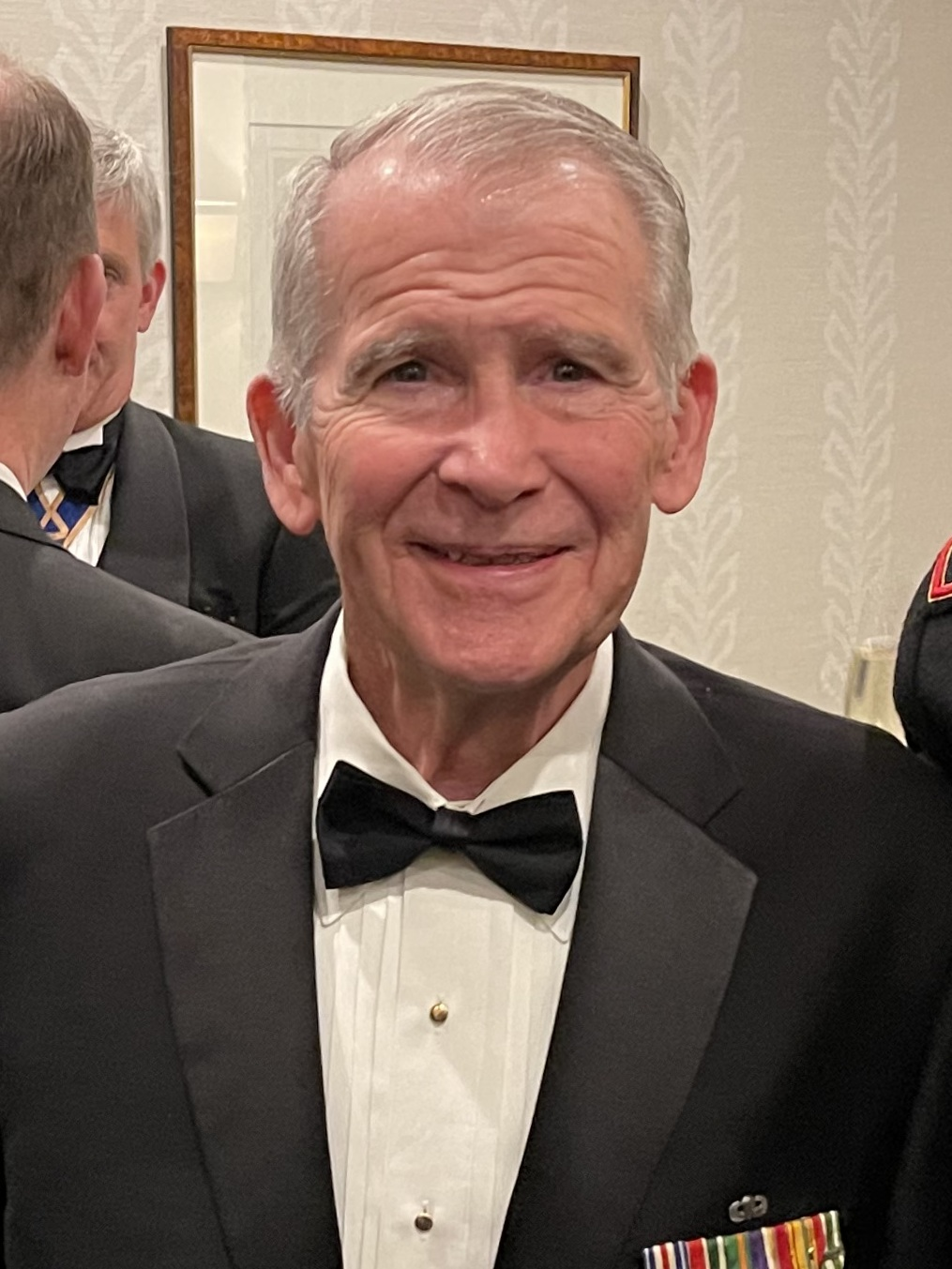
- North in 2023

65th President of the National Rifle Association
- In office September 2018 – April 29, 2019
- Preceded by: Pete Brownell
- Succeeded by: Carolyn D. Meadows

Personal details
- Born: Oliver Laurence North; October 7, 1943 (age 83) San Antonio, Texas, U.S.
- Party: Republican
- Spouse: Betsy Stuart (m. 1967; died 2024) Fawn Hall (m. 2025)
- Children: 4
- Education: State University of New York, Brockport; United States Naval Academy (BS)

Military service
- Allegiance: United States
- Branch/service: United States Marine Corps
- Years of service: 1968–1990
- Rank: Lieutenant colonel
- Unit: 1st Battalion, 3rd Marines (Vietnam); 3rd Battalion, 8th Marines; 2nd Marine Division
- Commands: Northern Training Area
- Battles/wars: Vietnam War
- Awards: Silver Star; Bronze Star with valor; Purple Heart (2); Combat Action Ribbon; Presidential Service Badge

Oliver Laurence North (born October 7, 1943) is an American political commentator, television host, military historian, author, and retired United States Marine Corps lieutenant colonel.

A veteran of the Vietnam War, North was a National Security Council staff member during the Iran–Contra affair, a political scandal of the late 1980s. It involved the illegal sale of weapons to the Islamic Republic of Iran to encourage the release of American hostages then held in Lebanon. North formulated the second part of the plan, which was to divert proceeds from the arms sales to support the Contra rebel groups in Nicaragua, official funding for which had been specifically prohibited under the Boland Amendment. North was granted limited immunity from prosecution in exchange for testifying before Congress about the scheme. He was initially convicted on three felony charges, but the convictions were vacated and reversed and all charges against him dismissed in 1991, on the grounds of immunity.

North unsuccessfully ran for the U.S. Senate seat held by Chuck Robb from Virginia in 1994. In a three-way race, North narrowly lost to Robb by a margin of 2.73%. He then hosted a talk show on Radio America from 1995 to 2003, and hosted War Stories with Oliver North on Fox News from 2001 to 2016. In May 2018, North was elected as president of the National Rifle Association. On April 27, 2019, he resigned amidst a dispute with the organization's chief executive Wayne LaPierre, and was succeeded by Carolyn D. Meadows.

== Early life ==
North was born in San Antonio, Texas, on October 7, 1943, the son of Ann Theresa (née Clancy) and Oliver Clay North, a U.S. Army major. He grew up in Philmont, New York, and graduated from Ockawamick Central High School in 1961. He attended the State University of New York at Brockport for two years.

While at Brockport, North spent a summer at the United States Marine Corps Platoon Leaders Class at Marine Corps Base Quantico in Virginia, and gained an appointment to the United States Naval Academy in 1963. He received his commission as second lieutenant in 1968, having missed a year due to serious back and leg injuries from an auto accident in which a classmate was killed. One of North's classmates at the academy was future secretary of the Navy and U.S. senator Jim Webb, whom he beat in a middleweight championship boxing match at Annapolis. (North had shown films of this match to Marine Medical Corps officials to prove that he had fully recovered from his serious accident and could endure the rigors of midshipman training.) Their graduating class included Dennis C. Blair, Michael Mullen, Jay L. Johnson, Charles Bolden and Michael Hagee.

== U.S. Marine Corps career ==
=== Vietnam ===
North served as a platoon commander during the Vietnam War, where during his combat service, he was awarded the Silver Star, Bronze Star Medal with Combat V, and two Purple Heart medals. At the time of his being awarded the Silver Star, North was a platoon commander leading his Marines in Operation Virginia Ridge. North led a counter-assault against the People's Army of Vietnam, as his platoon took on heavy machine gun fire and rocket propelled grenades. Throughout the battle, North displayed "courage, dynamic leadership and unwavering devotion to duty in the face of grave personal danger".

=== Post-Vietnam ===
In 1970, North returned to South Vietnam to testify as a character witness at the trial of Lance Corporal Randall Herrod, a U.S. Marine formerly under his command who, along with four others, had been charged with the murder of sixteen Vietnamese civilians in the village of Son Thang. North claims Herrod had previously saved his life. Herrod and one other Marine were acquitted.

North's post-Vietnam career included: instructor at the Marine Basic School from 1969 to 1974; director of the Northern Training Area in Okinawa, Japan (1973–1974); plans and policy analyst with the manpower division at Headquarters Marine Corps from 1975 to 1978; and operations officer (S3) for 3rd Battalion, 8th Regiment, 2nd Marine Division at Camp Lejeune (1978–80). He graduated from the College of Naval Command and Staff at the Navy War College in 1981.

=== National Security Council staff ===
In 1981, North began his assignment to the National Security Council staff in Washington, D.C., where he served as a lobbyist from 1981 to 1983; and deputy director for political–military affairs from 1983 until his reassignment in 1986. In 1983, North was promoted to lieutenant colonel.

During his tenure at the National Security Council, North managed a number of missions. This included leading the hunt for those responsible for the 1983 Beirut barracks bombing that killed 299 American and French military personnel, an effort that saw North arrange a mid-air interception of an EgyptAir jet carrying those responsible for the Achille Lauro hijacking. While at the National Security Council, he also helped plan the U.S. invasion of Grenada and the 1986 bombing of Libya.

During his Iran-Contra trial, North spent his last two years on active duty assigned to Headquarters Marine Corps in Arlington County, Virginia. He submitted his request to retire from the Marine Corps effective May 1, 1988, following his indictment for conspiring to defraud the United States by channeling the profits from US arms sales to the Contra rebels in Nicaragua. After his trial and felony convictions, all convictions were reversed on appeal.

== Military awards ==
North received the following military awards and decorations:

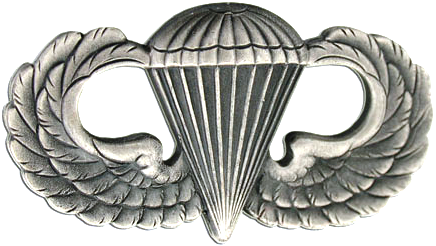

	Basic Parachutist Badge	
Silver Star Medal	Bronze Star Medal with Combat V device	
Purple Heart Medal with one 5/16" Gold Star	Defense Meritorious Service Medal	Meritorious Service Medal
Navy and Marine Corps Commendation Medal with Combat "V' device and two 5/16" Gold Stars	Navy and Marine Corps Achievement Medal with one 5/16" Gold Star	Combat Action Ribbon
Navy Unit Commendation	Navy Meritorious Unit Commendation with one 3/16" bronze star	National Defense Service Medal
Vietnam Service Medal with one 3/16" silver star	Sea Service Deployment Ribbon with one 3/16" bronze star	Navy and Marine Corps Overseas Service Ribbon
Republic of Vietnam Gallantry Cross with silver star	Republic of Vietnam Gallantry Cross Unit Citation with palm and frame	Republic of Vietnam Campaign Medal with 1960–device
Marine Corps Expert Rifle Badge		Marine Corps Expert Pistol Badge
	Presidential Service Badge	

== Iran–Contra affair ==
North came into the public spotlight as a result of his participation in the Iran–Contra affair, a political scandal during the Reagan administration, in which he claimed partial responsibility for the sale of weapons through intermediaries to Iran, with the profits being channeled to the Contras in Nicaragua. It was alleged that he was responsible for the establishment of a covert network which subsequently funneled those funds to the Contras. Congress passed the Boland Amendment (to the House Appropriations Bill of 1982 and following years), which prohibited the appropriation of U.S. funds by intelligence agencies for the support of the Contras.

North solicited $10 million from the Sultan of Brunei to skirt U.S. prohibitions on funding the Contras. However, he gave the wrong number of the Swiss bank account intended to launder the money, and it went instead to a Swiss businessman. A Senate committee investigating the transaction tracked it down so it could be returned to Brunei.

In an August 23, 1986, e-mail to National Security Advisor John Poindexter, North described a meeting with a representative of Panamanian General Manuel Noriega: "You will recall that over the years Manuel Noriega in Panama and I have developed a fairly good relationship," North writes before explaining Noriega's proposal. If U.S. officials can "help clean up his image" and lift the ban on arms sales to the Panamanian Defense Force, Noriega will "'take care of' the Sandinista leadership for us."

North told Poindexter that General Noriega could assist with sabotage against the ruling party of Nicaragua, the Sandinista National Liberation Front. North supposedly suggested that Noriega be paid $1 million in cash from Project Democracy funds raised from the sale of U.S. arms to Iran for the Panamanian leader's help in destroying Nicaraguan economic installations.

In November 1986, as the sale of weapons was made public, North was dismissed by President Ronald Reagan. In an interview with Cigar Aficionado magazine, North said that on February 11, 1987, the Federal Bureau of Investigation detected an attack on North's family from the Peoples Committee for Libyan Students, with an order to kill North. Although government officials later expressed skepticism of this claim, and no charges for this alleged plot were brought, his family was moved to Camp Lejeune in North Carolina and lived with federal agents until North retired from the Marine Corps the following year.

In July 1987, North was summoned to testify before televised hearings of a joint congressional committee that was formed to investigate the Iran–Contra scandal. During the hearings, North admitted that he had misled Congress, for which, along with other actions, he was later charged. He defended his actions by stating that he believed in the goal of aiding the Contras, whom he saw as freedom fighters against the Sandinistas and said that he viewed the Iran–Contra scheme as a "neat idea." North admitted shredding government documents related to these activities at William Casey's suggestion when the Iran–Contra scandal became public. He also testified that Robert McFarlane had asked him to alter official records to delete references to direct assistance to the Contras and that he had helped.

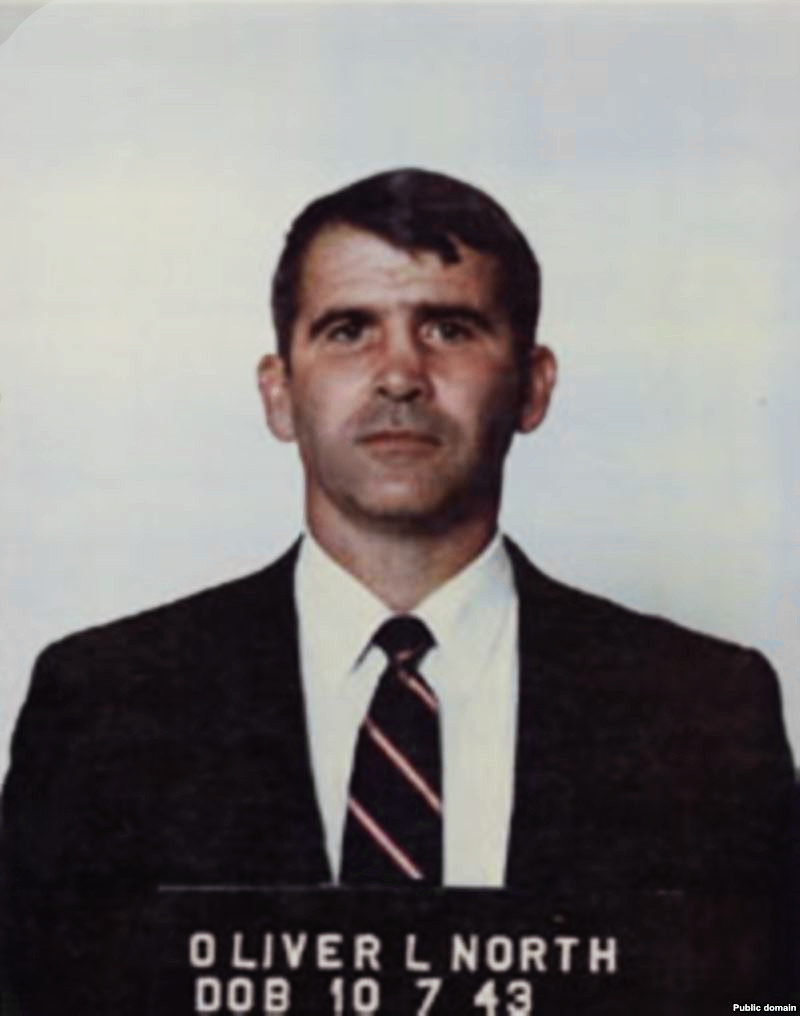
North's mugshot, taken on the day of his arrest

North was indicted in March 1988 on 16 felony counts. His trial opened in February 1989, and on May 4, 1989, he was initially convicted of three: accepting an illegal gratuity, aiding and abetting in the obstruction of a congressional inquiry, and ordering the destruction of documents through his secretary, Fawn Hall. He was sentenced by U.S. District Judge Gerhard Gesell on July 5, 1989, to a three-year suspended prison term, two years probation, $150,000 in fines, and 1,200 hours of community service. North performed some of his community service at Potomac Gardens, a public housing project in southeast Washington, D.C. However, with the help of the American Civil Liberties Union, North appealed his conviction to the U.S. Court of Appeals for the District of Columbia Circuit. On July 20, 1990, the D.C. Circuit vacated North's convictions on the ground that witnesses in his trial might have been impermissibly affected by his immunized congressional testimony.

The individual members of the prosecution team had isolated themselves from news reports and discussion of North's testimony, and while the defense could show no specific instance in which North's congressional testimony was used in his trial, the Court of Appeals ruled that the trial judge had made an insufficient examination of the issue. Consequently, North's convictions were reversed. After further hearings on the immunity issue, Judge Gesell dismissed all charges against North on September 16, 1991.

== Politics ==
In the 1994 election, North unsuccessfully ran for the United States Senate as the Republican Party candidate in Virginia. Republican senator John Warner of Virginia endorsed Marshall Coleman, a Republican who ran as an independent, instead of North. North lost, garnering 43 percent of votes, while incumbent Democrat Charles Robb, a son-in-law of President Lyndon B. Johnson, won reelection with 46 percent. Coleman received 11 percent. North's candidacy was documented in the 1996 film A Perfect Candidate.

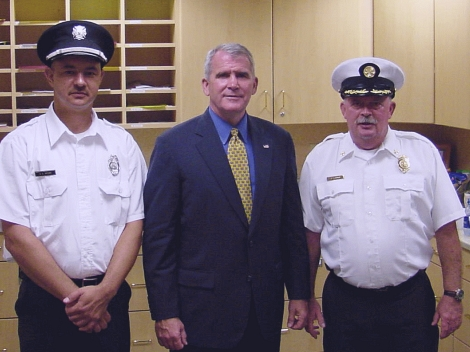
Oliver North in 2005, pictured with Clinton Township, Franklin County, Ohio Assistant Fire Chief John Harris and Lieutenant Douglas Brown, at a public speaking event

In his failed bid to unseat Robb, North raised $20.3 million in a single year through nationwide direct-mail solicitations, telemarketing, fundraising events, and contributions from major donors. About $16 million of that amount was from direct mail alone. This was the biggest accumulation of direct-mail funds for a statewide campaign to that date, and it made North the top direct-mail political fundraiser in the country in 1994.

=== Freedom Alliance ===
In 1990, North founded the Freedom Alliance, a 501(c)(3) foundation "to advance the American heritage of freedom by honoring and encouraging military service, defending the sovereignty of the United States, and promoting a strong national defense." The foundation's primary activities include providing support for wounded combat soldiers and providing scholarships for the children of service members killed in action.

Beginning in 2003, Sean Hannity has raised over $10 million for the Freedom Alliance Scholarship Fund through Freedom Concerts and donations from The Sean Hannity Show and its listeners. The charity has been criticized by conservative blogger Debbie Schlussel for distributing too little of its funds for charitable purposes. Hannity, North, and other charity spokespersons say that all of the "net" proceeds from the Freedom Concerts are donated to the fund.

=== National Rifle Association ===
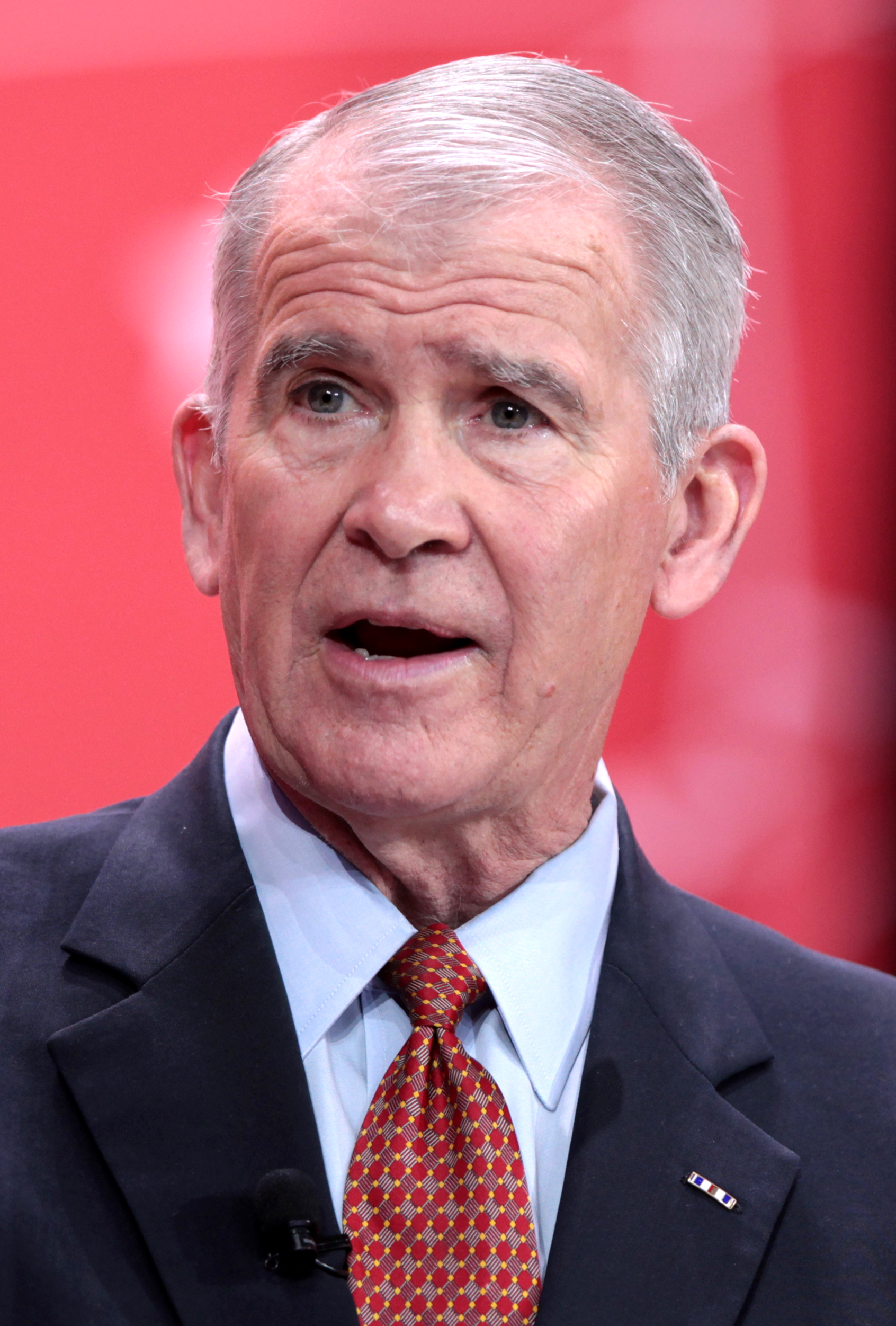
North in 2017, wearing his Silver Star medal ribbon

On May 7, 2018, the National Rifle Association (NRA) announced that North would become the organization's next president within the following weeks. He succeeded Pete Brownell, the incumbent. North is a board member in the NRA and appeared at NRA national conventions in 2007 and 2008. North began his term as president in September 2018.

In April 2019, in the midst of a wide-ranging dispute involving the NRA's chief executive Wayne LaPierre, the NRA's advertising agency Ackerman McQueen, and the NRA's law firm Brewer Attorneys & Counselors, North announced that he would not serve a second term as president, ostensibly against his wishes. On April 24, 2019, North asked LaPierre to resign. On April 16, 2019, North and NRA first vice president Richard Childress wrote to the chairman of the NRA audit committee and the NRA's secretary and general counsel calling for an independent audit of the billing from the NRA's law firm, Brewer Attorneys & Counselors. In an April 24, 2019 letter to the executive committee of the NRA board, North said that he was forming a committee to investigate alleged financial improprieties, allegations which he said threatened the NRA's non-profit status. In an April 25, 2019 letter to the NRA board, LaPierre said that North was threatening to release damaging information about him. On April 27, 2019, in a letter read on his behalf at the NRA's annual convention in Indianapolis, Indiana, North announced he would not serve a second term. North's term ended on April 29, 2019, when he was replaced by Carolyn D. Meadows. On May 3, 2019, Senators Ron Wyden of Oregon, Sheldon Whitehouse of Rhode Island, and Bob Menendez of New Jersey, members of the Senate Finance Committee, wrote to North, LaPierre, and the NRA's advertising agency Ackerman McQueen requesting copies of the letters to the NRA board by North and LaPierre, seeking documents related to the allegations, and directing records preservation.

== Media and books ==
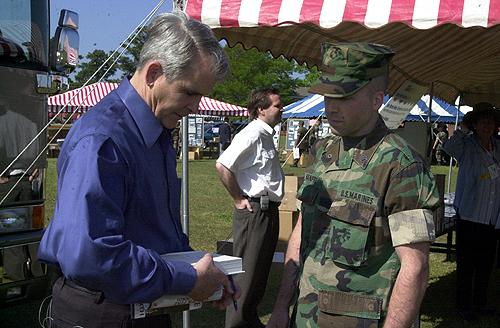
North in April 2002, autographing one of his books for a U.S. Marine Staff Sergeant

=== Film, television, radio, and videogames ===
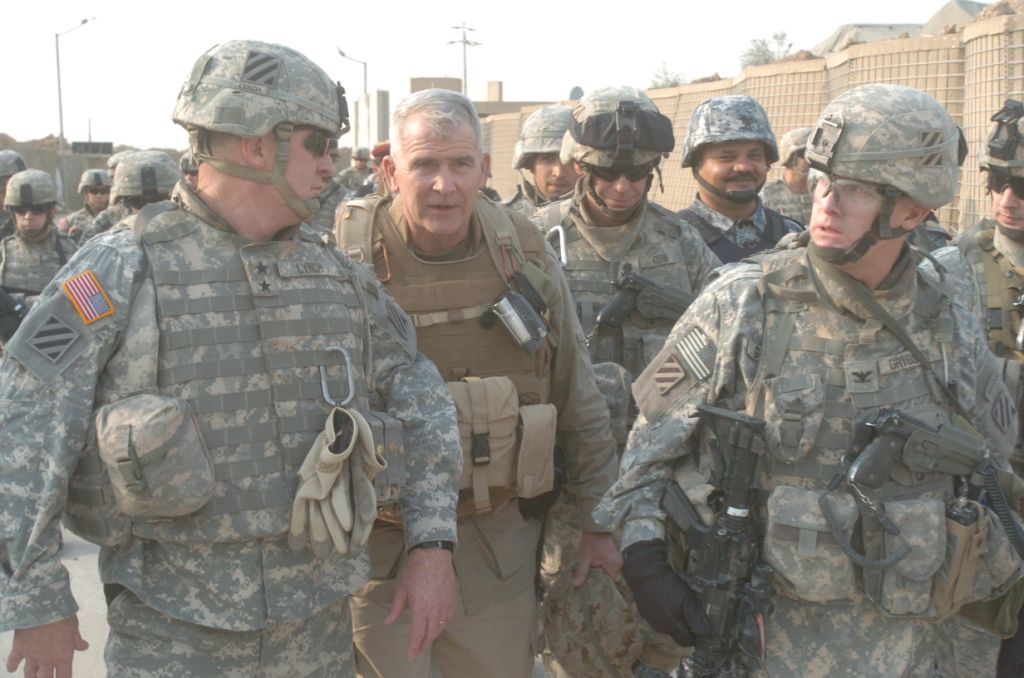
Oliver North (centre) in Iraq during the Iraq War as a journalist for Fox News

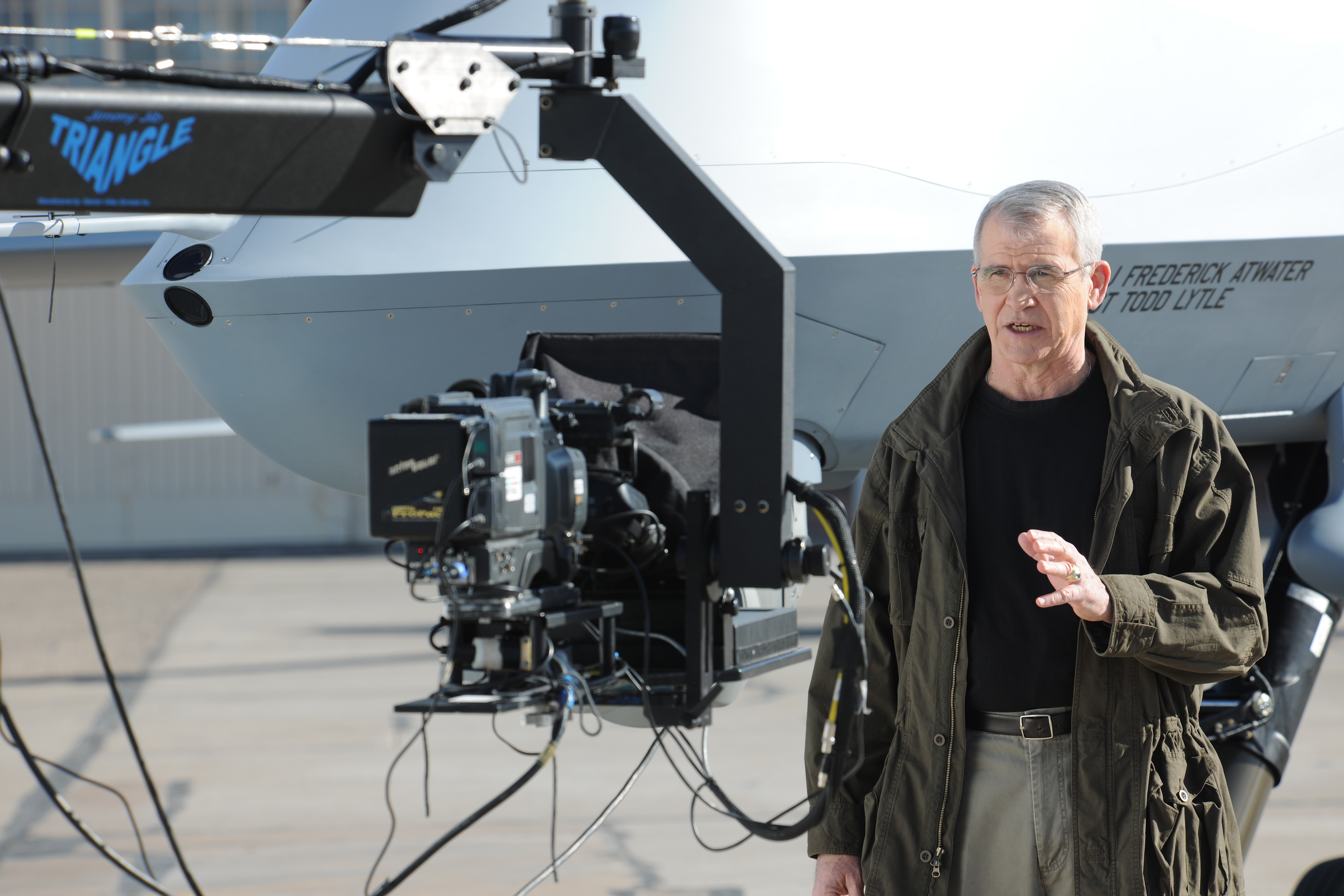
North filming a scene of War Stories with Oliver North at Holloman Air Force Base, New Mexico, 2010

North became increasingly known for his media career and appearances. In 1991, he appeared on the first season of The Jerry Springer Show. From 1995 to 2003, North was host of his own nationally syndicated talk radio show on Radio America, which was known as the Oliver North Radio Show or Common Sense Radio With Oliver North. He also served as co-host of Equal Time on MSNBC from 1999 to 2000. North was the host of the television show War Stories with Oliver North from 2001 to 2016 and is a regular commentator on Hannity, both on the Fox News Channel.

North appeared as himself on many television shows, including the sitcom Wings in 1991, and three episodes of the TV military drama JAG in 1995, 1996, and 2002 as "Ollie", a close friend of the deceased father of Tracey Needham's character Meg Austin. He has also appeared as himself in several film documentaries.

In addition, he regularly speaks at both public and private events. North appears in an episode of Auction Kings to have his Marine Corps sword returned after it was lost and presumably stolen in 1980. North was credited as a military consultant in the 2012 video game Call of Duty: Black Ops II and voiced himself in a cutscene. In 2014, he received story credit for an episode of the TV series The Americans where the Soviet spy protagonists infiltrate a Contra training base in the United States.

=== Nonfiction books ===
- Under Fire: An American Story, co-author William Novak, Zondervan, 1991, ISBN 978-0060183349
- One More Mission: Oliver North Returns to Vietnam, co-author David Roth, Zondervan, January 1, 1993, ISBN 978-0310404903
- War Stories: Operation Iraqi Freedom, Regnery History, 2003, ISBN 978-0895260635
- True Freedom: The Liberating Power of Prayer, Multnomah Press, 2003, ISBN 978-1590523636
- A Greater Freedom: Stories of Faith from Operation Iraqi Freedom, B&H Books, 2004, ISBN 978-0805431537
- War Stories II: Heroism in the Pacific, Regnery History, 2004, ISBN 978-0895261090
- War Stories III: The Heroes Who Defeated Hitler, Regnery History, 2005, ISBN 978-0895260147
- American Heroes: In the Fight Against Radical Islam, Broadman & Holman Publishing, 2008, ISBN 978-0805447118
- American Heroes: In Special Operations, Fidelis Books, 2010, ISBN 978-0805447125
- American Heroes: On the Homefront, Threshold Editions, 2013, ISBN 978-1476714325
- Veterans' Lament: Is This the America Our Heroes Fought For?, co-author David Goetsch, Fidelis Books, 2020, ISBN 978-1642935011
- American Gulags: Marxist Tyranny in Higher Education and What to do About It., co-authors David Goetsch and Archie Jones, Fidelis Books, 2023, ISBN 978-1956454062

=== Fiction books ===
- Mission Compromised, co -author Joe Musser, Broadman & Holman Publishers, 2002, ISBN 978-0805425505
- The Jericho Sanction, co-author Joe Musser, Broadman & Holman Publishers, 2003, ISBN 978-0805425512
- The Assassins, co-author Joe Musser, Broadman & Holman Publishers, 2005, ISBN 978-0805425529
- Heroes Proved, Threshold Editions, 2012, ISBN 978-1476706313
- Counterfeit Lies, co-author Bob Hamer, Threshold Editions, 2014, ISBN 978-1476714356
- The Rifleman, Fidelis Books, 2019, ISBN 978-1642933147
- The Giant Awakes, co-author Bob Hamer, Fidelis Books, 2022, ISBN 978-1956454048

== Personal life ==
In 1967, North married Betsy Stuart; the couple had four children. Although raised in the Catholic faith of his mother, North attended Protestant services with his wife and children. The Norths lived in McLean, Virginia.

Betsy North died on November 16, 2024 of corticobasal syndrome. On August 27, 2025, North married Fawn Hall, his former secretary, in a private ceremony in rural Virginia.

== In popular culture ==
A double-page comic strip satire, "Col. Ollie," appeared in the defunct Clinton Street Quarterly, in the summer of 1987.

In a 1995 episode of the TV series Sliders, Cornel North [sic] is President of the United States on a parallel Earth.

Oliver North is the focus of episode 15, Season 4 of the animated series American Dad! In that episode, it is rumored North buried a treasure under the main family's home. Protagonist Stan Smith tries to find the treasure for himself. A musical recounting the Iran-Contra affair also appears in the episode.

Party political offices
Preceded by Maurice Dawkins	Republican nominee for U.S. Senator from Virginia (Class 1); 1994	Succeeded by George Allen
Non-profit organization positions
Preceded by Carolyn D. Meadows	President of the National Rifle Association; 2018–2019	Succeeded by Carolyn D. Meadows
