= Pete Brownell =

American businessman

Peter Brownell

President of the National Rifle Association
- In office 2017–2018
- Preceded by: Allan D. Cors
- Succeeded by: Oliver North

Personal details
- Born: Peter Royce Brownell; 1969 (age 56–57)
- Party: Republican
- Spouse: Helen Redmond
- Education: University of Iowa
- Occupation: Businessman

Peter Royce Brownell (born 1969) is an American businessman. He is the Chairman of the Board of Brownells, a supplier of firearm accessories, ammunition and supplies based in Grinnell, Iowa. He is also chairman and CEO of Brownell's parent company, 2nd Adventure Group.

Brownell is a well known philanthropist. He has supported numerous causes such as renovating a public library, arts programs, building a skate park, planting a community garden, a robotics program at a local high school, a community education program at Grinnell College, and a new emergency center at the Grinnell Regional Medical Center. His donations to Grinnell College caused controversy, raising the question "if you take someone's money, are you endorsing them?" and caused the college to revise its gift acceptance policy, adding language saying Grinnell can consider the source of the funds when deciding whether to accept or decline a gift.

Brownell attended the University of Iowa. He earned a BBA in Administration and Marketing in 1991 and an MBA in 2001.

In 1997, Brownell started work at Brownells, the company started by his grandfather in Montezuma, Iowa, as an executive vice president. Under his leadership, Brownells expanded rapidly, acquired three other firearms-related businesses, became a defense contractor, created an online store, and moved into retail. Brownell became CEO in January 2012.

Brownell and his father Frank Brownell own various firearm-related businesses through their holding company that they co-chair, 2nd Adventure Group. Brownell is CEO. Businesses and brands owned through 2nd Adventure Group include Brownells; Crow Shooting Supply; the Big Springs Shooting Complex in Searsboro, Iowa; W.L. Baumler Company, a national wholesale distributor of hunting supplies and sporting goods based in Ohio; Sinclair International, an online retailer headquartered in Montezuma, Iowa that mainly sells tools for reloading ammunition, cleaning and maintaining firearms, and gun accessories; and AR15.com, an online forum that says it is "the world’s largest firearm community and is a gathering place for firearm enthusiasts of all types."

Brownell was on the National Rifle Association of America (NRA) board of directors starting in 2010 but resigned in late May 2019 due to the demands that position placed on his time. He was president of the NRA from May 2017 to May 2018. Brownell is a member of the NRA's Golden Ring of Freedom, the group's biggest donors who are honored with a mustard-colored jacket.

As of 2015, Brownell is on the board of Iowa Economic Development Authority.
