= List of 2020 United States presidential electors =

This list of 2020 United States presidential electors contains members of the Electoral College, known as "electors", who cast ballots to elect the president of the United States and vice president of the United States in the 2020 presidential election. There are 538 electors from the 50 states and the District of Columbia.

The members of the 2020 Electoral College met on December 14, 2020. 306 electors voted for Joe Biden for President and Kamala Harris for Vice President. 232 electors voted for Donald Trump for President and Mike Pence for Vice President. There were no faithless electors.

While every state except Nebraska and Maine chooses the electors by statewide vote, many states require that one elector be designated for each congressional district. These electors are chosen by each party before the general elections. A vote for that party then confirms their position. In all states except Nebraska and Maine, each state's electors are winner-take-all. In Maine and Nebraska within each congressional district one elector is allocated by popular vote – the states' remaining two electors (representing the two U.S. Senate seats) are winner-take-both. Except where otherwise noted, such designations refer to the elector's residence in that district rather than election by the voters of the district.

== Alabama ==
Electors: 9, pledged to vote for Donald Trump for President and Mike Pence for Vice President:

- Jacquelyn Gay (District 1) – Republican Activist (Brewton)
- Jeana S. Boggs (District 2) – Court Reporter (Montgomery)
- Joseph R. Fuller (District 3) – Attorney (Alexander City)
- John H. Killian (District 4) – Baptist Minister (Fayette)
- J. Elbert Peters (District 5) – Chair, District Five Republican Party (Huntsville)
- Joan Reynolds (District 6) – Chair, Shelby County Republican Party
- Rick Pate (District 7) – State Commissioner of Agriculture
- Dennis H. Beavers (at-large) – State Director, Trump 2020 Campaign
- John Wahl (at-large) – Vice Chair, State Party (Limestone County)

== Alaska ==
Electors: 3, pledged to vote for Donald Trump for President and Mike Pence for Vice President

- John Binkley – Riverboat Pilot (Fairbanks)
- Judy Eledge – Retired Educator (Anchorage)
- Randy Ruedrich – Former State Party Chair (2000–2013)

== Arizona ==
Electors: 11, pledged to vote for Joe Biden for President and Kamala Harris for Vice President:

- Constance Jackson – Vice President, NAACP
- Felecia Rotellini – Chair, Arizona Democratic Party
- Fred Yamashita – Executive Director, Arizona AFL-CIO
- James McLaughlin – President, Arizona AFL-CIO
- Jonathan Nez – President of the Navajo Nation
- Luis Alberto Heredia – Democratic National Committee member
- Ned Norris Jr. – Chairman of Tohono O'odham Nation
- Regina Romero – Mayor of Tucson
- Sandra Kennedy – Corporation Commissioner
- Stephen Roe Lewis – Governor, Gila River Indian Community
- Steve Gallardo – Member of the Maricopa County Board of Supervisors

== Arkansas ==
Electors: 6, pledged to vote for Donald Trump for President and Mike Pence for Vice President:

- Sharon Brooks – Sebastian County Clerk
- Iverson Jackson – Minister (Little Rock)
- George Ritter – Deputy General Counsel, Republican Party of Arkansas (Note: Ritter replaced Ed Bethune – Former Congressman)
- Rod Soubers – Chair, Baxter County Republican Party
- Doyle Webb – Chair, Arkansas Republican Party
- Joseph K. Wood – Judge (Washington County) (Note: Wood replaced J.D. McGehee – District Director, US Rep Westerman)

== California ==
Electors: 55, pledged to vote for Joe Biden for President and Kamala Harris for Vice President:

- Agustin Arreola – Community Organizer, 23, Thermal
- Joy Atkinson (Note: Atkinson replaced Yolanda Parker – Democratic Activist, View Park)
- Katherine Bancroft – Native American Activist, Lone Pine
- Kara Bechtle – Tuolumne County Democratic Party, Soulsbyville
- Brandon Benjamin – Campaign Staffer, Liam O'Mara, Corona
- Janine Bera, MD – Wife of Congressman Ami Bera
- Peter Bolland – Philosophy Professor, San Diego
- Mary Bowker – Organizer and Activist, Napa
- Janice Brown – Labor Lawyer, San Diego
- John Casey (Note: Casey replaced Alex Norman – Professor of Social Work, Yorba Linda)
- Jacki Cisneros – Wife of Congressman Gil Cisneros
- Marsha Conant – Stonewall Democrats, Fresno
- Joseph Patrick Cox (Note: Cox replaced Steven D. Diebert – Probate Referee, Fresno)
- Freddye Davis – NAACP Activist, Hayward
- Emily Dredd – Staffer, Governor Newsom, Sacramento
- Lee Fink – Attorney, Tustin
- Bryan Fletcher – Former NFL Player, San Diego
- Mark Gonzalez – Chair, Los Angeles County Democratic Party
- Madeline Handy – UC-Davis Student
- Ronald Herrera – Teamsters, Long Beach
- Rusty Hicks – American labor union activist, Chair of the California Democratic Party, Pasadena (Note: Hicks replaced Wallace Knox – Executive Director Port of Los Angeles)
- Jihee Huh – Attorney, Rolling Hills
- LaNiece Jones – Community Organizer, Oakland
- Elizabeth Kann – Physician, Walnut Grove
- David M. Kennedy – Historian
- Dona Kerkvliet-Varin – Democratic Activist, Turlock
- Vinzenz Koller – Monterey County Democrats, Carmel
- Franklin Lima – Firefighter, Camarillo
- Christina Marquez – Teacher, San Bernardino
- Yvette Martinez (Note: Martinez replaced Catherine Ward – Philanthropist, Sunset Beach)
- Pete McCloskey – now-Democratic former Republican United States Representative
- Thomas McInerney – Attorney, former Marin County elected official, San Anselmo
- Jillian McNerney – Daughter in Law, Congressman Jerry McNerney
- Nelida Mendoza – City Council, Santa Ana
- Bettey Monroy – Downey Democratic Party
- Brock Neeley – LGBTQ Activist, Porterville
- Jane Pandell – Attorney, Danville
- Bill Prady – television producer
- Andre Quintero – Mayor, El Monte
- Amy Rao – Philanthropist, Palo Alto
- Kevin Sabellico – Organizer for Kamala Harris, Carlsbad
- Anne Sanger – City Government, Sacramento
- Mattie Scott – Gun violence Activist, San Francisco
- Suzanne Singer – Rabbi, Riverside
- Brian Solecki – Campaign Manager, Rep. Audrey Denney, Chico
- Darrell Steinberg – Mayor, Sacramento (Note: Steinberg replaced Rosalind Wyman – Former Alderwoman, Los Angeles)
- Erin Sturdivant – College Student, Piedmont
- Tamlyn Tomita – Actress, Glendale
- Robert Torres – City Council, Pomona
- Karen Waters – Daughter of Rep. Maxine Waters, Inglewood
- Shirley Weber – State Assembly, San Diego
- Katherine Wilkinson – Professor, San Jose State
- Tayte Williams – College Student, Los Angeles
- Brandon Zavala – Campaign Manager, Christy Smith For Congress

== Colorado ==
Electors: 9, pledged to vote for Joe Biden for President and Kamala Harris for Vice President

- Anita Lynch – Bernie Sanders Activist, 74, Denver
- Jerad Sutton – Chair, Weld County Democratic Party
- Judith Ingelido – Retired teacher, 73, Colorado Springs
- Victoria Marquesen – Retired education professor, Pueblo
- Polly Baca – former state legislator, four time elector
- Bryan Hartmann – Democratic Activist, Highlands Ranch
- Alan Kennedy – Attorney/Law Professor, Denver
- Susan McFaddin, Sustainable Home Builder, Fort Collins
- Roger Fang (replacement for Ann Knollman)

== Connecticut ==
Electors: 7, pledged to Joe Biden for President and Kamala Harris for Vice President

- Dana Barcellos Allen of Avon, a staffer for Rep. Jahana Hayes
- Susan Barrett, Town Chair of Fairfield
- Dominic Balletto Jr of East Haven, Chair of the CT Democratic Party
- John Kalamarides of Wilton, Chair of Wilton Democrats
- William Smith of Hartford
- Myrna Watanabe of Harwinton, a biology professor
- Anthony Attanasio of Niantic, an engineer

== Delaware ==
Electors: 3, pledged to vote for Joe Biden for President and Kamala Harris for Vice President

- John Daniello – Former State Party Chairman
- Marla Blunt-Carter – Professor Rutgers-Camden, Sister of US Rep. Lisa Blunt Rochester
- Marie Mayor – Former legislative candidate

== District of Columbia ==
Electors: 3, pledged to vote for Joe Biden for President and Kamala Harris for Vice President:

- Jacqueline Echavarria (at-large) – Safeway cashier
- Meedie Bardonille (at-large) – Washington DC Board of Nursing
- Barbara Helmick (at-large) – Program Director, DC Vote

== Florida ==
Electors: 29, pledged to vote for Donald Trump for President and Mike Pence for Vice President:

- Maximo Alvarez – Businessman (Miami)
- Jeff Brandes (Note: Brandes replaced State Sen. Wilton Simpson after the latter tested positive for COVID-19 ahead of the vote.) – State Senator
- John Browning – Transportation Commission; 2016 Elector
- Marili Cancio – Attorney (Miami)
- Nelson Diaz – Chair, Miami-Dade Republican Party
- Peter Feaman – Attorney (Boynton Beach); 2016 Elector
- Randy Fine – State Representative (Brevard County)
- Jason Fischer – State Representative (Jacksonville Area)
- Charlotte Flynt – Chair, Walton County Republican Party
- Joe Gruters – State Senator and Chair, State Party
- Roy Hinman – Physician (Saint Augustine)
- James Holton – Attorney (Saint Petersburg)
- Marva Johnson – Chair, Florida State Board of Education
- Belinda Keiser – Vice Chancellor, Keiser University
- Kathleen King – Republican National Committee Member
- J.C. Martin – Chair, Polk County Republican Party
- Patrick Neal – Realtor; Former State Senator
- Jeanette Nuñez – Lieutenant Governor (Note: Nuñez replaced Palm Beach Republican activist Gay Gaines ahead of the vote.)
- Kathleen Passidomo – State Senator (Collier County)
- Daniel Perez – State Representative
- Keith Perry – State Senator
- Moshe Popack – Realtor/Attorney (Miami)
- Ray Wesley Rodrigues – State Senator (Note: Rodrigues replaced Delray Beach dentist Jeffrey Feingold ahead of the vote.)
- Diane Scherff – Chair, Saint Johns County (South Ponte Verde)
- Frank Schwerin – Cardiologist (Naples)
- Chris Sprowls – Speaker, Florida House of Representatives
- Linda Stoch – Pam Beach Gardens
- Tim Weisheyer – Realtor (Kissimmee)
- Christian Ziegler – Sarasota County Commissioner; 2016 Elector

== Georgia ==
Electors: 16, pledged to vote for Joe Biden for President and Kamala Harris for Vice President:

- Nikema Williams, Democratic Party of Georgia Chair, State Senator, Congressmember-elect
- Stacey Abrams, former Georgia House Minority Leader, activist
- Bob Trammell, outgoing State Representative
- Steve Henson, State Senator
- Calvin Smyre, State Representative
- Van R. Johnson, Mayor of Savannah
- Wendy Davis – City Council, Rome GA
- Gloria Butler, State Senator
- Deborah Gonzalez, District Attorney-elect of Western Judicial Circuit, former State Representative
- Bobby Fuse – Civil Rights Activist; Chair, 2nd District Democrats
- Sachin Varghese – Attorney, Georgia Democratic Party
- Fenika Miller – Houston County Democratic Party, Chair of 8th Congressional District Democrats
- Pedro Marin, State Representative
- Rachel Paule – Chair, Georgia Young Democrats, Sandy Springs
- Cathy Woolard, former Atlanta City Council member
- Ben Myers – Political Affairs Director, IBEW, Duluth GA

In addition, 3 alternate Democratic electors were selected in case any of the electors could not attend: Alaina Reeves, Bianca Keaton and Jason Esteves.

== Hawaii ==
Electors: 4, pledged to vote for Joe Biden for President and Kamala Harris for Vice President:

- Hermina 'Mina' Morita (at-large) – Member of the Public Utilities Commission
- John William Bickel (at-large) – Teacher and Democratic Activist
- Kainoa Kaumeheiwa-Rego (at-large) – LGBTQ Activist, State Treasurer of Hawaii Democratic Party
- Michael Golojuch (at-large) – Veteran, Civil Servant

== Idaho ==
Electors: 4, pledged to vote for Donald Trump for President and Mike Pence for Vice President

- Rod Beck – Former State Senator
- Raúl Labrador – Former US Representative
- Janice McGeachin - Lieutenant Governor
- Melinda Smyser – Director, Idaho Office of Drug Policy (Parma)

== Illinois ==
Electors: 20, pledged to vote for Joe Biden for President and Kamala Harris for Vice President:

- Michelle A. Harris (District 1)
- Al Riley (District 2)
- Silvana Tabares (District 3)
- Omar Aquino (District 4) (Note: Aquino replaced Jesús "Chuy" García; the latter is ineligible to serve as an elector due to being a member of Congress.)
- Cynthia Santos (District 5) – former board member of the Metropolitan Water Reclamation District of Greater Chicago
- Nancy Shepardson (District 6) – State Central Committee, Barrington
- Vera Davis (District 7) – Wife of US Representative Danny K. Davis
- Michael Cudzik (District 8) – Chair, Schaumburg Area Democratic Party
- Michael Cabonargi (District 9)
- Lauren Beth Gash (District 10)
- Julia Kennedy Beckman (District 11) – School Board Member, Darien
- Chris Welch (replacing Jerry Costello) (District 12)
- Jayne Mazzotti (District 13) – Language Teacher, Taylorville
- Kristina Zahorik (District 14) – Chair, McHenry County Democratic Party
- Brandon Phelps (District 15)
- Christine Benson (District 16) – Illinois State Board of Education
- Don Johnston (District 17) – County Board, Rock Island County
- Sheila Stocks-Smith (District 18) – Urban Action Network, Springfield
- Lori Lightfoot – Mayor of Chicago (at-large)
- Don Harmon – State Senate President (at-large)

== Indiana ==
Electors: 11, pledged to vote for Donald Trump for President and Mike Pence for Vice President

- Don E. Bates Jr. – Accountant (Saint John)
- George Brown – LaGrange County Judge
- Beth Boyce – Chair, Johnson County Republican Party
- Jim Buck - State Senator
- Dana Dumezich – Lake County Elections Board
- Jeffery M. Heinzmann – Attorney (Fishers)
- Brian L. Mowery – Indianapolis City Council
- Courtney Papa – Vice President, Elhart County Republican Party
- Edwin J. Simcox – Former Indiana Secretary of State
- William Springer – Chair, Sullivan County Republican Party
- Matthew D. Whetstone – State Representative (Brownsburg)

== Iowa ==
Electors: 6, pledged to vote for Donald Trump for President and Mike Pence for Vice President:

- David Chung (District 1) – Technical Trainer (Cedar Rapids)
- Thad Nearmyer (District 2) – Jasper County Republican Party (Monroe)
- Ronald Forsell (District 3) – Assistant County Attorney (Waukee)
- Kolby Dewitt (District 4) – Staffer, US Senate (Sioux City)
- Charlie Johnson (at-large) – Pottawattamie County Chair (Council Bluffs)
- Kurt Brown (at-large) – Former Recorder, O'Brien County (Primghar); Elector in 2012, 2016

== Kansas ==
Electors: 6, pledged to vote for Donald Trump for President and Mike Pence for Vice President

- Treatha Brown Foster – former President, Kansas Black Republican Council (Wichita)
- Shannon Golden – Executive Director, Kansas State Party
- Mark Kahrs – Republican National Committee (also 2016 elector)
- Mike Kuckelman – Chair, Kansas State Party
- Helen Van Etten – Republican National Committee (also 2016 elector)
- Emily Wellman – Secretary, Kansas State Party

== Kentucky ==
Electors: 8, pledged to vote for Donald Trump for President and Mike Pence for Vice President:

- Richard J. Grana (District 1) – State Party Executive Committee
- Laura LaRue (District 2) – Chair, Second District Republicans
- Jack L. Richardson IV (District 3) – Attorney (Louisville)
- Earl Bush (District 4) – Judge (Bracken County)
- Bob M. Hutchison (District 5) – Chair, Fifth District Republicans
- Ken Kearns II (District 6) – Former legislative candidate
- Carol Rogers (at-large) – Chair, Sixth District Republicans
- Ellen Williams (at-large) – Former Chair, State Party

== Louisiana ==
Electors: 8, pledged to vote for Donald Trump for President and Mike Pence for Vice President:

- Eric F. Skrmetta (District 1) – Public Service Commission
- Robert C. Monti (District 2) – Saint Charles Parish Chair (Luling)
- Ross Little Jr. (District 3) – Republican National Committee
- Rodney Michael Collier (District 4) – Investment Broker (Benton)
- Kay Kellogg Katz (District 5) – Former State Representative
- Beth A. Billings (District 6) – St Charles Parish Chair (Destrehan)
- Louis "Woody" Jenkins (at-large) – Journalist; State Representative (1976–2000)
- Vinson J. Serio (at-large) – Accountant (Metairie)

== Maine ==
Electors: 4, 3 pledged to vote for Joe Biden for President and Kamala Harris for Vice President:

- Jay Philbrick (District 1) – College Student, Brown University, 18; North Yarmouth
- State Senator Shenna Bellows (at-large)
- David Bright (at-large) – Farmer, Dixmont; 2016 Elector

1 pledged to vote for Donald Trump for President and Mike Pence for Vice President:

- Peter LaVerdiere (District 2) – Former Board Chair (Oxford ME), 79

== Maryland ==
Electors: 10, pledged to vote for Joe Biden for President and Kamala Harris for Vice President:

- Sheree Sample-Hughes (District 1) – Speaker Pro Tem, Maryland Assembly
- Sachin Hebbar (District 2) – Candidate, State Representative
- Catalina Rodriguez-Lima (District 3) – Immigrant Affair staffer, Baltimore Mayors Office
- Gloria Lawlah (District 4) – State Secretary of Aging
- Kent Roberson (District 5) – State Party Central Committee, Prince George's County
- Patrick Hunt (District 6) – Chair, Garrett County Democratic Party
- Thelma T. Daley (District 7) – Professional Educator, Baltimore
- Corynne Courpas (District 8) – Chair, Carroll County Democratic Party
- Kathleen Matthews (at-large), former Chair, Maryland Democratic Party
- Peter E. Perini Sr. (at-large) – City Council, Hagerstown

== Massachusetts ==
Electors: 11, pledged to vote for Joe Biden for President and Kamala Harris for Vice President:

- Kate Donaghue (at-large) – MA Democratic Central Committee
- Nicolle LaChapelle (at-large) – Mayor, Easthampton
- Joseph F Kelly (At Large) – Electrician, IBEW, Hingham
- Tom Larkin (at-large) – Retired Psychologist, University of MA, 84
- Robert Markell (at-large) – Former Mayor, Springfield
- Linda Monteiro (at-large) – Staffer, State Senator Miranda
- Jay Rivera (at-large) – Democratic Activist, Lawrence
- Norma Shulman (at-large) – Elizabeth Warren Activist, Framingham
- Lesley Phillips (replacement for Ron Valerio) (at-large)
- Teresa Walsh (at-large) – State Committeewoman, Middlesex
- Wayne Yeh (at-large) – LGBTQ Activist, Jamaica Plain

== Michigan ==
Electors: 16, pledged to vote for Joe Biden for President and Kamala Harris for Vice President:

- Chris Cracchiolo (District 1) – Grand Traverse Democratic Party, Williamsburg
- Timothy Smith (District 2) – Michigan Education Association, Grand Haven
- Blake Mazurek (District 3) – History Teacher, Grand Rapids
- Bonnie Lauria (District 4) – Retired Autoworker, 79, West Branch
- Bobbie Walton (District 5) – Democratic Activist, 83, Davison
- Mark Miller (District 6) – City Clerk, Kalamazoo
- Connor Wood (District 7) – Jackson County Democratic Party
- Robin Smith (District 8) – Librarian, Lansing
- Walt Herzig (District 9) – Staffer for Rep. Andy Levin, Ferndale (Mr. Herzig was unable to attend meeting of electors on December 14, 2020. Sharon Baseman, also of District 9, was nominated to replace him and the electors unanimously agreed to seat Sharon Baseman as an elector.)
- Carolyn Holley (District 10) – Retired Activist, 81, Port Huron
- Susan Nichols (District 11) – Legal Assistant, Northville
- Steven Rzeppa (District 12) – Communications Director, AFSCME
- Helen Moore (District 13) – Education Activist, 84, Detroit
- Michael Kerwin (District 14) – UAW Retiree, 96
- Marseille Allen (at-large) – Michigan Department of Corrections, Flint
- Chuck Browning (at-large) – UAW Director, Rockwood

== Minnesota ==
Electors: 10, pledged to vote for Joe Biden for President and Kamala Harris for Vice President:

- Melvin Aanerud – Author, Ham Lake MN
- Muhammad Abdurrahman – Technology Professor, Minneapolis [2016 Elector]
- Joel Heller – Executive Committee, Minnesota DFL
- Nausheena Hussain – Islamic activist, Brooklyn Park
- Nancy Larson – Democratic National Committee (2004–2012)
- Mark Liebow – Physician, Mayo Clinic
- Roxanne Mindeman – Attorney, Apple Valley
- Cheryl Poling – Chair, Third District DFL Party
- Diana Tastad-Damer – Organizer, UFCW union
- Travis Thompson – Psychologist, University of Minnesota

== Mississippi ==
Electors: 6, pledged to vote for Donald Trump for President and Mike Pence for Vice President:

- Franc Lee – CEO, Tower Loans
- Frank Bordeaux – Chair, State Party (Gulfport)
- Bruce Martin – Mississippi Universities Board
- Johnny McRight – Biostimulants Manufacturer
- Terry Reeves – Father of Governor Tate Reeves
- John Dane, III – Olympic Sailor/CEO Yacht Company

== Missouri ==
Electors: 10, pledged to vote for Donald Trump for President and Mike Pence for Vice President

- Maureen O’Gorman (District 1, Saint Louis)
- Penny Henke (District 2, Saint Charles) – Republican National Committee Member
- Sherry Kuttenkuler (District 3, Holts Summit) – Legislative Assistant
- William “Bill” Kartsonis (District 4, Lake Winnebago) – Manager of Linen Supply Company
- Daniel Wesley Hall, PhD (District 5, Lee's Summit) – Public Service Commission
- State Senator Dan Hegeman (District 6, Crosby)
- Ron Richard (District 7, Joplin) – former MO Senate President Pro Tem
- Mike Homeyer (District 8, Salem) – VP of Finance, Wells Fargo
- State Representative Glen Kolkmeyer (At Large, Odessa)
- Susie Eckelcamp (At Large, Saint Albans) – Republican National Committee Member

== Montana ==
Electors: 3, pledged to vote for Donald Trump for President and Mike Pence for Vice President:

- Thelma Baker – Owner, Thunderbird Motel (Missoula); Veteran Elector
- Becky Stockton – 2016 Elector
- Brad Tschida – House Majority Leader

== Nebraska ==
Electors: 5

4 pledged to vote for Donald Trump for President and Mike Pence for Vice President

- George Olmer (District 1) – Republican Activist (Lincoln)
- Teresa Ibach (District 3) – Wife of Trump Deputy Secretary of Agriculture (Sumner)
- Darlene Starman (at-large) – Realtor (Lincoln)
- Steve Nelson (at-large) – Nebraska Farm Bureau

1 pledged to vote for Joe Biden for President and Kamala Harris for Vice President

- Precious McKesson (District 2) – Staffer, Nebraska Democratic Party

== Nevada ==
Electors: 6, pledged to vote for Joe Biden for President and Kamala Harris for Vice President:

- Judith Whitmer – Vice Chair, Clark County Democratic Party
- Sarah Mahler – Chair, Washoe County Democratic Party
- Joseph Throneberry – Cyber and fraud investigations industry leader, Las Vegas
- Artemesia Blanco – Democratic National Committee member
- Gabrielle D'Ayr – homeless veteran, Las Vegas; Clark County Democrats
- Yvanna Cancela, member of the Nevada Senate

== New Hampshire ==
Electors: 4, pledged to vote for Joe Biden for President and Kamala Harris for Vice President:

- Mary Carey Foley – Retired teacher, Portsmouth
- Dana S. Hilliard – Mayor of Somersworth, New Hampshire
- Former House Speaker Steve Shurtleff
- Senate Democratic Leader Donna Soucy

== New Jersey ==
Electors: 14, pledged to vote for Joe Biden for President and Kamala Harris for Vice President:

- Edward Kologi – Attorney, Linden
- Mike Beson – Chair, Monmouth County Democratic Party
- Richard Berdnik – Sheriff, Passaic County
- Kelly Ganges – Chief of Staff, Mercer County
- Brendan Gill – Campaign Manager, Governor Phil Murphy
- LeRoy Jones – Chair, Essex County Democratic Party
- Matt Platkin – Counsel, Governor Phil Murphy
- Tammy Murphy – First Lady of New Jersey
- Saily Avelenda – Executive Director, State Party
- Francesca Giarratana – Hudson County Planning Department
- Lynn Hurwitz – Chair, Hackensack Democratic Party
- Roberta Karpinecz – former councilwoman, Somerville
- Jill Kotner – Staffer, Rep. Mikie Sherrill
- Derya Taskin – Turkish-American filmmaker, Paterson

== New Mexico ==
Electors: 5, pledged to vote for Joe Biden for President and Kamala Harris for Vice President

- Vince Alvarado – President, New Mexico AFL-CIO
- Stephanie Thomas – Chair, Chaves County Democratic Party
- Ben Salazar – Staffer, Senator Tom Udall
- Brianna Gallegos – President NM Young Democrats. 27
- Aleta "Tweety" Suazo – Chair, Native American Democratic Caucus (Acoma)

== New York ==
Electors: 29, pledged to vote for Joe Biden for President and Kamala Harris for Vice President:

- June O'Neill (at-large) – Chair, NYS Democratic Party; economics professor
- Xiao Wang (at-large) – AL&E Corporation, Westbury
- Katherine M. Sheehan (at-large) – Albany Mayor
- Thomas J. Garry (at-large) – Attorney, Rockville Center
- Lovely Warren (at-large) – Rochester Mayor
- Gary LaBarbera (at-large) – Construction Trades Union, Wantagh
- Stuart Applebaum (at-large) – President, RWDSU, New York
- Mary Sullivan (at-large) – Civil Service Employees Union, Albany
- George K. Gresham (at-large) – SEIU Vice President, Bronx
- Rhonda "Randi" Weingarten (at-large)
- Mario F. Cilento (at-large) – President, New York State AFL-CIO
- Alphonso David (at-large) – LGBTQ Rights attorney, Brooklyn
- Hazel Dukes (at-large)
- Christine C. Quinn (at-large) – Former Speaker of the New York City Council
- Byron Brown (at-large) – Mayor of Buffalo
- Corey Johnson (at-large) – Speaker of the New York City Council
- Scott Stringer (at-large) – New York City Comptroller, 26th Borough President of Manhattan
- Andrea Stewart-Cousins (at-large) – Majority Leader and Temporary President of the New York State Senate
- Carl Heastie (at-large) – Speaker of the New York State Assembly
- Jay S. Jacobs (at-large) – Chair, NYS Democratic Party, Syosset
- Letitia James (at-large) – Attorney General of New York
- Thomas DiNapoli (at-large) – New York State Comptroller
- Kathy Hochul (at-large) – Lieutenant Governor of New York
- Andrew Cuomo (at-large) – Governor of New York
- Hillary Rodham Clinton (at-large) – Former first lady, senator, secretary of state and 2016 Democratic presidential nominee
- Bill Clinton (at-large) – 42nd President of the United States
- Rubén Díaz Jr. (at-large) – Borough president of The Bronx
- Judith Hunter (at-large) – Chair, Livingston County Democrats, Geneseo
- Anastasia Somoza (at-large) – Disability Rights Advocate, NYC

== North Carolina ==
Electors: 15, pledged to vote for Donald Trump for President and Mike Pence for Vice President:

- Thomas Hill – Republican Activist/Freemason (Gates)
- Edwin Gavin – Wake County Republican Party
- David Wickersham – Pamlico County Republican Party (Arapahoe)
- Angie Cutlip – Education Consultant (Wendell)
- Jonathan Fletcher – Chair, Gaston County Republican Party
- Tina Forsberg – Treasurer, Guilford County Republican Party
- Chauncey Lambeth – District Director, US Rep. David Rouzer
- Susan Mills – High School Teacher (Fayetteville)
- Daniel Barry – Former congressional candidate (Charlotte)
- Danny Overcash – Minister and Healer (Charlotte)
- Mark Delk – Asheville NC; 2016 Elector
- Melissa Bell Taylor – Real Estate (Cornelius)
- Blake Williams – Retired General (Alamance County)
- Michele Nix – Vice Chair, State Party (Carteret County)
- Michael Whatley – Chairman, State Party

== North Dakota ==
Electors: 3, pledged to vote for Donald Trump for President and Mike Pence for Vice President:

- Sandy J. Boehler – Republican National Committee Member
- State Senator Ray Holmberg (Grand Forks)
- Robert Wefald – Retired District Court Judge

== Ohio ==
Electors: 18, pledged to vote for Donald Trump for President and Mike Pence for Vice President:

- Ken Blackwell (District 1) – Former Ohio Secretary of State (Cincinnati)
- Bonnie Ward (District 2) – Teacher (Waverly City)
- Barbara Clark (District 3) – Rehab Counselor (Columbus); Former Democrat
- Keith Cheney (District 4) – Chair, Allen County Republicans (Lima)
- Mark Wagoner (District 5) – Former State Legislator (Ottawa Hills)
- Dave Johnson (District 6) – Chair, Columbiana County Republican Party (Salem)
- Joy Padgett (District 7) – Former State Senator (Coshocton)
- Patti Alderson (District 8) – State Central Committee Member (West Chester)
- Steve Loomis (District 9) – President of Cleveland Police Union
- Rob Scott (District 10) – City Council Member (Kettering)
- Patricia Weber (District 11) – Summit County School Board (Akron)
- Bob Paduchik (District 12) – State Director, Trump Campaign 2020 (Westerville)
- Karen Arshinkoff (District 13) – Wife of Summit County Chair (Hudson)
- Jim Wert (District 14) – Financial Advisor (Lyndhurst); Major Republican Donor
- Jim Canepa (District 15) – Chief of State, Ohio EPA (Dublin)
- Jane Timken (District 16) – Chair, State Party (Canton)
- Madison Gesiotto (at-large) – Beauty Queen/Conservative Pundit (Canton)
- Darrell C. Scott (at-large) – Minister (Solon); early Trump backer 2016

== Oklahoma ==
Electors: 7, pledged to vote for Donald Trump for President and Mike Pence for Vice President:

- Ronda Vuillemont-Smith (at-large) – Tea Party Activist (Tulsa)
- Lonnie Lu Anderson (at-large) – State Executive Committee (Crowder)
- Chris Martin (at-large) – State Executive Committee (Yukon)
- Steve Fair (at-large) – Republican National Committee (Duncan)
- Linda Huggard (at-large) – Republican National Committee (Oklahoma City)
- A.J. Ferate (at-large) – Federalist Society Attorney (Edmond)
- Carolyn McLarty (at-large) – Veterinarian (Stillwater)

== Oregon ==
Electors: 7, pledged to vote for Joe Biden for President and Kamala Harris for Vice President

- Laura Gillpatrick – Chair, Fourth CD Democratic Party
- Carla Lynn Hanson – Chair, State Party (Portland)
- Leigha Lafleur – Paralegal and Democratic Activist (Portland)
- Pete Lee – Vice Chair, State Party
- Sean Nikas – Realtor and Progressive Activist (Salem)
- Nathan Joseph Soltz – Chair, Second CD Democratic Party, youngest ever presidential elector at age 23
- Lawrence D Tayor – Former Democratic National Committee member

== Pennsylvania ==
Electors: 20, pledged to vote for Joe Biden for President and Kamala Harris for Vice President:

- Nina Ahmad – Former candidate for Auditor General
- Val Arkoosh – Supervisor, Montgomery County
- Cindy Bass – City Council, Philadelphia
- Richard Bloomingdale – President, Pennsylvania AFL-CIO
- Ryan Boyer – Business Manager, LIUNA
- Paige Gebhardt Cognetti – Mayor, Scranton
- Daisy Cruz – Mid-Atlantic Director, SEIU
- Kathy Dahlkemper – County Executive, Erie County and former United States Representative
- Janet Diaz – City Council, Lancaster
- Virginia McGregor – Deputy Finance Chair, DNC
- Charles Hadley – Former candidate for State Representative, Philadelphia
- Jordan A. Harris – State Representative
- Malcolm Kenyatta – State Representative
- Gerald Lawrence – Delaware County Board of Elections
- Clifford Levine – Attorney, Pittsburgh
- Nancy Mills – Democratic National Committee member
- Marian Moskowitz – Commissioner, Chester County
- Josh Shapiro – Pennsylvania Attorney General
- Sharif Street – State Senator
- Constance H. Williams – Former State Senator

== Rhode Island ==
Electors: 4, pledged to vote for Joe Biden for President and Kamala Harris for Vice President

- Elizabeth Beretta Perik, Treasurer of the State Democratic Party
- James Diossa, mayor of Central Falls, Rhode Island
- Joseph R. Paolino Jr. Former Mayor of Providence and Ambassador to Malta
- Sabina Matos, President of the Providence City Council

== South Carolina ==
Electors: 9, pledged to vote for Donald Trump for President and Mike Pence for Vice President:

- Terry Hardesty (District 1) – Education Consultant (Moncks Corner)
- Jim Ulmer (District 2) – Chair, Orangeburg County Republican Party
- JoAnn Burroughs (District 3) – Chair, Greenwood County Republican Party
- Suzette Jordan (District 4) – Staffer, US Rep. Trey Gowdy
- State Representative Brandon Newton (District 5) – Lancaster - replaced by Newberry County Republican Party Chair Theresa "Charm" Altman
- Sandra Bryan (District 6) – Chair, Sixth District Republican Party
- Gerri McDaniel (District 7) – Trump Campaign Staffer (North Myrtle Beach)
- Drew McKissick (at-large) – Chair, State Party
- Cindy Costa (at-large) – Republican National Committee Member

== South Dakota ==
Electors: 3, pledged to vote for Donald Trump for President and Mike Pence for Vice President:

- Republican Party Chair Dan Lederman (Replaced Governor Kristi Noem)
- Lieutenant Governor Larry Rhoden
- Attorney General Jason Ravnsborg

== Tennessee ==
Electors: 11, pledged to vote for Donald Trump for President and Mike Pence for Vice President

- Paul Chapman – State Executive Committee
- Cindy Hatcher – State Executive Committee (Blount County)
- Tina Benkiser – Attorney/Former State Party Chair
- John Stanbery – Dentist (Cleveland)
- Beverly Knight-Hurley – Retired (Nashville)
- Mary Ann Parks – State Executive Committee (White House)
- Jim Looney – State Executive Committee (Lawrence County), 7 X Lawrence County Republican Chairman
- Kathy Bryson (District 8) – Christian Mom/State Executive Committee
- Terry Roland (District 9)- former mayoral candidate (Shelby County)
- Scott Smith – State Executive Committee (Knoxville)
- Julia Atchley-Pace – Educator (Madisonville)

== Texas ==
Electors: 38, pledged to vote for Donald Trump for President and Mike Pence for Vice President

Nominated at Republican State Convention from Congressional Districts (CD) as follows:

- CD 1 - Marcia Daughtrey – Vice President, Smith County Republican Party
- CD 2 - Steven K. Howell – Political Consultant (Dallas)
- CD 3 - Jim Pikl – Attorney/Candidate for Judge (Frisco)
- CD 4 - Donnie W. Wisenbaker – Chair, Hopkins County
- CD 5 - Jimmy Weaver – Campaign Strategist (Kaufman County)
- CD 6 - Michael Sabat – Registered Nurse, Texas Asian Republican Assembly (Tarrant County)
- CD 7 - Nancy Scott – Treasurer, Village Republican Women
- CD 8 - Bill O'Sullivan – Texas Patriots PAC (Montgomery County)
- CD 9 - Dawn Elliott – Harris County Republican Party
- CD 10 - Mark Ramsey – Texas Right to Life (Spring TX)
- CD 11 - Matthew Stringer – Conservative Journalist (Odessa)
- CD 12 - Rena Land Peden – Secretary, Texas State Party (Fort Worth)
- CD 13 - Tom Roller – Chair, Potter County (Amarillo)
- CD 14 - Kathleen Allor Nenninger – Bay Area Republican Women (Clear Creek)
- CD 15 - Sean O'Brien – Karnes County Commissioner (Karnes)
- CD 16 - Thomas Edward Reynolds – Attorney (Dallas)
- CD 17 - James Gaines – Economist, Texas A&M University (Bryan)
- CD 18 - Tamon Hamlett – Student, University of Houston, 19
- CD 19 - David Bruegel – Realtor (Lubbock)
- CD 20 - Ken Mercer – Texas State Board of Education (San Antonio)
- CD 21 - Richard "Tex" Hall – Rancher (Bulverde, Conal County)
- CD 22 - Mike Gibson – Oil Drilling Consultant (Fort Bend County)
- CD 23 - Marco A. Rodriguez – Combat Veteran (San Antonio)
- CD 24 - Dave Gebhart – Bedford City Council
- CD 25 - Mary Jane Britton Avery - Cellist, 66
- CD 26 - Peyton Inge
- CD 27 - Gene Seaman – Former State Representative (Corpus Christi)
- CD 28 - Ruby Manen – Chair, Wilson County Republican Party (Floresville)
- CD 29 - Randy Lynn Orr Jr. – Former State Senate candidate
- CD 30 - Harry Ed Zenner – Cedar Hill
- CD 31 - Paul Matthews – Accountant (Austin)
- CD 32 - Matt Patrick – Political Activist (Dallas)
- CD 33 - Carol Daley – Parent (Arlington)
- CD 34 - Charles (Tad) Hasse – Computer Technician (Brownsville)
- CD 35 - Naomi Narvaiz – State Executive Committee (San Marcos)
- CD 36 - Debra Risinger – Harris County Republic Party (Houston)
- At Large - Karen Newton – Texas Federation of Republican Women (San Antonio)
- At Large - State Representative Briscoe Cain – Attorney (Deer Park)

== Utah ==
Electors: 6, pledged to vote for Donald Trump for President and Mike Pence for Vice President:

- Mia Love (replacement for Sean Reyes) – former US Representative
- Former State Representative Greg Hughes – Ran for governor 2020
- Kris Udy – former County Commissioner candidate
- Jimi Kestin – Chair, Washington County Republican Party
- Chris Herrod – former State Representative
- Trent Christensen – Venture capitalist, Congressional candidate 2020

== Vermont ==
Electors: 3, pledged to vote for Joe Biden for President and Kamala Harris for Vice President

- Terje Anderson, former Chair of State Democratic Party
- Linda V. Gravell, Chair of Waterbury County Democratic Party
- Kesha Ram, State Representative

== Virginia ==
Electors: 13, pledged to vote for Joe Biden for President and Kamala Harris for Vice President:

- Matthew D. Rowe – Chair, 1st CD Democratic Committee, GIS administrator, former congressional candidate (Fredericksburg)
- Barbara H. Klear – Treasurer, Democratic Party of Virginia (Norfolk)
- Clinton L. Jenkins – Delegate, 76th District of the Virginia House of Delegates (Portsmouth)
- Kimberly M. Dieber – Nursing coordinator (Richmond)
- Cyliene R. Montgomery – Disability rights activist (Brunswick County)
- Leah V. Pence – Former member of the Luray Town Council
- Robert A. Martin – Postal inspector and activist (Spotsylvania County)
- Charles C. Hines – Retired Journalist
- Karen B. Combs – Chair, Washington County Democratic Committee
- Ellen "EJ" Scott – Chair, Democratic Black Caucus of Virginia (Manassas)
- Suchada V. Langley – Economist, US Department of Agriculture (Vienna)
- Margo E. Horner – Chair, 8th CD Democratic Committee (Arlington)
- Susan R. Swecker – Chair, Democratic Party of Virginia (Highland County)

== Washington ==
Electors: 12, pledged to vote for Joe Biden for President and Kamala Harris for Vice President:

- Martin Chaney (District 1) – Fifth District Democrats, Carnation
- Jack Arends (District 2) – School Principal/Administrator, Tumwater
- Jackie Lane (District 3) – Activist, Battleground
- Patsy Whitefoot (District 4) – Yakima Nation, White Swan
- Nancy Monacelli (District 5) – DNC Member, Walla Walla
- Julie Johnson (District 6) – Lummi Nation, Neah Bay
- Sophia Danenberg (District 7)
- Jen Carter (District 8) – Attorney, Seattle
- Bryan Kesterson (District 9) – Executive Committee, WA State Party
- Julian Wheeler (District 10) – Chair of Pierce County Democrats, Lakewood
- Santiago Ramos (at-large) – Immigrant rights activist, former House candidate, Kirkland
- Payton Swinford (at-large) – Washington State Young Democrats, Ellensburg

== West Virginia ==
Electors: 5, pledged to vote for Donald Trump for President and Mike Pence for Vice President:

- Lewis Rexroad (District 1) – West Virginia Voters Hall of Fame Member (Wood County)
- Beth Bloch (District 2) – Republican National Committee (Kanawha)
- Governor Jim Justice (District 3)
- Paul Hartling (at-large) – Chair, Republican County Chairs Association (Putnam County)
- Gary Duncan (at-large) – Republican Activist (Jefferson County)

== Wisconsin ==
Electors: 10, pledged to vote for Joe Biden for President and Kamala Harris for Vice President:

- Mag Andrietsch (District 1), Secretary of Democratic Party WI
- Shelia Stubbs (District 2)
- Ron Martin (District 3), President, Wisconsin Education Association
- Lieutenant Governor Mandela Barnes (District 4)
- Khary Penebaker (District 5)
- Mary Arnold (District 6), Chair of Columbia County Democratic Party
- State Senator Patty Schachtner (District 7)
- Shannon Holsey (District 8), Chair of Stockbridge-Munsee Band
- Governor Tony Evers (at-large)
- Ben Wikler (at-large) – State Party Chair

== Wyoming ==
Electors: 3, pledged to vote for Donald Trump for President and Mike Pence for Vice President:

- Karl Allred (at-large) – State Executive Committee (Uinta County)
- Doug Chamberlain (at-large) – Former State Party Treasurer
- Marti Halverson (at-large) – Former State Representative (2013–2019)

== See also ==
- Federalist Papers
- Trump fake electors plot

Preceded by 2016	Electoral College (United States); 2020	Succeeded by 2024
