= List of 2024 United States presidential electors =

2024 presidential electors

This list of 2024 United States presidential electors contains members of the Electoral College, known as "electors", who cast ballots to elect the president of the United States and vice president of the United States in the 2024 presidential election. There are 538 electors from the 50 states and the District of Columbia.

The members of the 2024 Electoral College met on December 17, 2024, the first Tuesday after the second Wednesday of December as per the Electoral Count Reform and Presidential Transition Improvement Act of 2022.

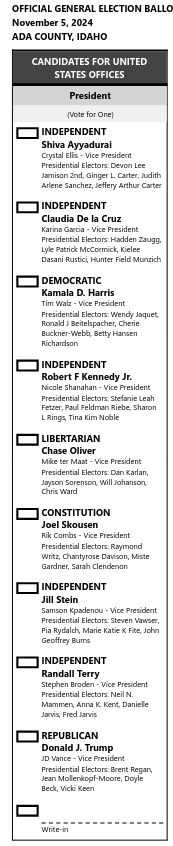
Candidates and their four electors on a ballot in Ada County, Idaho.

While every state except Nebraska and Maine chooses the electors by statewide vote, many states require that one elector be designated for each congressional district. These electors are chosen by each party before the general elections. A vote for that party then confirms their position. In all states except Nebraska and Maine, each state's electors are winner-take-all. In Maine and Nebraska within each congressional district one elector is allocated by popular vote – the states' remaining two electors (representing the two U.S. Senate seats) are winner-take-both. Except where otherwise noted, such designations refer to the elector's residence in that district rather than election by the voters of the district.

== Alabama ==
Electors: 9, pledged to vote for Donald Trump for President and JD Vance for Vice President:

- Bill M. Harris (at-large), RNC National Committeeman from Alabama
- Renee Powers (at-large), Regional Chair of the Alabama Republican Party for Congressional Districts 3, 6, and 7.
- Jackie Gay (1st district), chair of the Escambia County, Alabama Republican Party
- Mike Dean (2nd district), former state representative from the 104th district
- Lance Bell (3rd district), state senator from the 11th district
- Bonnie Sachs (4th district), Chair of the Congressional District 4 Alabama Republican Party.
- Tommy Hanes (5th district), state representative from the 23rd district
- Chris Brown (6th district), chair of the Jefferson County, Alabama Republican Party and Chair of the Congressional District 6 Alabama Republican Party.
- Rick Pate (7th district), Alabama Agriculture Commissioner

== Alaska ==
Electors: 3, pledged to vote for Donald Trump for President and JD Vance for Vice President:

- Eileen Becker, Alaska Republican regional representative
- Ron Johnson, Alaska Republican regional representative
- Rick Whitbeck, legislative aide and Alaska State Director for Power the Future

== Arizona ==
Electors: 11, pledged to vote for Donald Trump for President and JD Vance for Vice President:

- Abegal Gonzalez, youngest Arizona presidential elector
- Lisa Green, chair of the Navajo County Republican Party
- Nathan C. Jackson, former Vice Chair of the Arizona Republican Party
- Thomas W. Lewis, real estate investor and philanthropist
- Dottie Lizer, former second spouse of the Navajo Nation
- Myron Lizer, former Vice President of the Navajo Nation
- Steven R. McEwen, constitutional amendment activist
- Belinda Rodriguez, chair of the Pinal County Republican Party
- Trevor Smith, political donor
- Gina Swoboda, chair of the Arizona Republican Party
- Robert L. Swoboda, technology consultant and husband of Gina

== Arkansas ==
Electors: 6, pledged to vote for Donald Trump for President and JD Vance for Vice President:

- Sarah Dunklin, QAanon Activist, ran for state party chair
- Jennifer Lancaster, attorney, Chair 2nd District Republicans
- Joseph K. Wood, chair of the Republican Party of Arkansas
- Eddie Arnold, RNC member
- Jonathan Barnett, former state representative (Siloam Springs)
- Mindy McAlindon, state representative from the 10th district

== California ==
Electors: 54, pledged to vote for Kamala Harris for President and Tim Walz for Vice President:

- Candice Adam-Medefind, executive director of Healthy House Within a MATCH Coalition.
- Paloma Aguirre, mayor of Imperial Beach
- Angela Andrews, Hayward city councilor
- Joy Atkinson, Executive Director of the Los Angeles African American Women's Public Policy Institute
- Faith Bardet
- Cheylynda Barnard, Moreno Valley city council member
- Janine Bera, wife of Congressman Ami Bera
- Shon Buford, firefighter and former President of San Francisco Fire Fighters Local 798.
- Jacqueline Casillas, Vice-Mayor of Corona
- Elizabeth Cisneros, Lamont Elementary School District school board member
- Raye Clendening, educator
- Robin Cole, assistive technology manager
- Glen Dake, member of the board of directors of the Metropolitan Water District
- Xiomara Flores-Holguin, professor and retired social worker
- Seta Ghazarian, founder of political organization High Desert Progressive Democrats
- Mark Gonzalez, chair of the Los Angeles County Democratic Party
- Sandra Hahn, Executive Committee member of the LA County Arts Commission
- Abigail Haskell Flores, physician assistant
- Patrick Hurley, 2012 candidate for California State Assembly
- Sara Johnson, organizer for political organization Housing California
- Judy Ki, retired public school teacher and Asian American political organizer
- Jacintha Knapp, LA Democrats organizer
- Vinzenz Koller, vice-president of the Center for Apprenticeship & Work-Based Learning at Jobs for the Future
- Darlene Kuba, businesswoman and lobbyist
- Alexis Lewis, former First Vice President of the San Mateo NAACP
- Franklin Lima, firefighter
- Jacqueline Lowe, developmental therapist
- Diana Madoshi, retiree rights advocate
- Asha Muldro, consultant
- Ellen Nash, Black American Political Association of California San Diego chair
- Dean Ngo, internal medicine doctor
- Jacob O'Donnell, California School Boards Association regional chair
- Elizabeth O'Sullivan
- Angela Padilla, wife of U.S. Senator Alex Padilla
- Ari Parker, former mayor of Watsonville
- Alicia Quintana, credit union representative
- James Reed
- Robert A. Rivas, Speaker of the California State Assembly
- Cecy Rivera, college student and former White House intern
- Claudette Roehrig, Second Vice-President of Democratic Women of Santa Barbara County
- Monica Ruiz, wife of U.S. Representative Raul Ruiz
- Rogerio Salazar, political consultant
- Deepa Sharma, state chair, Asian American & Pacific Islander California Democrats
- Parke Skelton, political consultant
- Krishunda Monique Stegner, Los Angeles police service representative
- Susan Tate, retired investment banker and environmental activist
- Janet Thompson, wife of Congressman Mike Thompson
- Rebecca Turner Soule
- Karen Waters, daughter of Congresswoman Maxine Waters
- Howard Welinsky, UCLA and Jewish lobbyist
- Ann Wilson
- William Woodruff
- Amy Worth, former Orinda city council member
- Timothy Yee, retirement investor

== Colorado ==
Electors: 10, pledged to vote for Kamala Harris for President and Tim Walz for Vice President:

- Polly Baca, former state senator from the 25th district (1979-87) and state representative from the 34th district (1974-79)
- Carolyn Boller, retiree rights activist
- Khadija Haynes, African American activist
- Junie Joseph, state representative from the 10th district and former member of the Boulder City Council (2019-23)
- Nita Lynch, Progressive political organizer
- John Mikos, retired army lieutenant and management consultant
- Jarrod Munger, Morgan County Democratic party chair
- Cindy Orr, Mesa County Democratic party chair
- Gil Reyes, Former Adams County Assessor
- Kathryn Wallace, Jefferson County Democratic party chair

== Connecticut ==
Electors: 7, pledged to vote for Kamala Harris for President and Tim Walz for Vice President:

- Dominic Balletto, commissioner of the Connecticut Division of Liquor Control
- Dorothy Grady, member of the Coventry Democratic Town Committee
- David Kostek, digital director of the Democratic Party of Connecticut
- Tiffani McGinnis, member of the West Hartford Town Council
- Michael Pohl, chair of the Manchester Democratic Town Committee
- Geraldo Reyes, state representative from the 75th district
- Kevin Sullivan, former lieutenant governor (2004-07), state senator from the 5th district (1987-2004) and president pro tempore of the Connecticut Senate (1997-2004)

== Delaware ==
Electors: 3, pledged to vote for Kamala Harris for President and Tim Walz for Vice President:

- Cassandra T. Marshall, Chair of the City of Wilmington Democratic Party
- Terri A. Mcivor, Delaware Democratic Party Executive Committee Member
- Jane E. Hovington, former Chair of the Sussex County NAACP and 2023 nominee for State House of Representatives

== District of Columbia ==
Electors: 3, pledged to vote for Kamala Harris for President and Tim Walz for Vice President:

- Russell Breckenridge, Director of Legislative Affairs for the Union of Steamfitters and Plumbers
- Addison Rose, legislative intern
- Darryl Wiggins, businessman and activist

== Florida ==
Electors: 30, pledged to vote for Donald Trump for President and JD Vance for Vice President:

- Ben Albritton, Majority Leader of the Florida Senate
- Kristy Banks, State Party Secretary
- Dean Black, state representative from the 15th district
- Pam Bondi, former Florida Attorney General, nominated for US Attorney General
- Anthony Bonna, Port St. Lucie city councilor
- Jack Brill, Chair of the Republican Party of Sarasota County
- James Campo, State Party Assistant Treasurer
- Mark Cross, Florida State Republican Party committeeman from Osceola County
- Richard DeNapoli, Lauderdale-By-The-Sea, Florida city councilor
- Peter Feaman. RNC member
- Randy Fine, state senator from the 19th district
- Shawn Foster, consultant and former congressional staffer
- Ben Gibson, member of the Florida Board of Education
- Joe Gruters, state senator from the 22nd district
- Bill Helmich, interim Executive Director of the Florida Republican Party
- Erin Huntley, Chair of the Republican Party of Orange County
- Belinda Keiser, major political contributor
- Kathleen King, RNC member
- Kevin Marino Cabrera, Trump nominee for ambassador to Panama
- Michele Merrell, Florida Republican Party executive committee member
- Mike Moberley, State Party treasurer
- Ashley Moody, Florida Attorney General
- Clint Pate, State Party Assistant Secretary
- Jimmy Patronis, Chief Financial Officer of Florida
- Daniel Perez (politician), Speaker of the Florida House of Representatives
- Jesse Phillips, vice-chair of the Republican Party of Florida
- Evan Power, chair of the Republican Party of Florida
- Barbara Price, president of the Florida Federation of Republican Women
- Wilton Simpson, Florida Commissioner of Agriculture
- Jovante Teague, Dixie County Supervisor

== Georgia ==
Electors: 16, pledged to vote for Donald Trump for President and JD Vance for Vice President:

- Carl Blackburn, Chair 9th CD Republicans
- Denise Burns, Chair 14th District Republicans
- Hai Cao, candidate for state representative, District 107
- Jenny Eckman, State Party Assistant Treasurer
- Jamie Ensley, Log Cabin Republicans, National Chair
- Salleigh Grubbs, State Party Over 80K Chair
- Caroline Jeffords, State Party Secretary
- Betsy Kramer, candidate for state representative, District 50
- Laurie McClain, State Party Treasurer
- Joshua McKoon, Chair of the Georgia Republican Party
- Wendell McNeal, candidate for state representative, District 114
- Rufus Montgomery. attorney and lobbyist
- Steve Schultz
- Jason Thompson, RNC committee member
- Paul Voorhees, host of "Ranger Joe's God and County Show"
- Susan "Suzi" Voyles, State Party Assistant Secretary

== Hawaii ==
Electors: 4, pledged to vote for Kamala Harris for President and Tim Walz for Vice President:

- John William Bickel, president of Americans for Democratic Action Hawaii
- Michael Golojuch Jr., vice-president of the Hawaii AFL-CIO and Hawaii State Committee Member
- Roth Kaipo Puahala, state employee
- Osa Aneki Tui Jr., president of the Hawaii State Teachers' Association

== Idaho ==
Electors: 4, pledged to vote for Donald Trump for President and JD Vance for Vice President:

- Vicki Keen, RNC member
- Doyle Beck, Bonneville County GOP Chair
- Brent Regan, Kootenai County GOP Chair
- Jean Mollenkopf-Moore, Regional GOP Chair, major contributor

== Illinois ==
Electors: 19, pledged to vote for Kamala Harris for President and Tim Walz for Vice President:

- Omar Aquino, state senator from the 2nd district
- Christine Benson, member of the Illinois Board of Education
- Melinda Bush, member of the Democratic State Central Committee
- Bill Cunningham, state senator from the 18th district, president pro tempore of the state senate, and former state representative from the 35th district (2011-13)
- Cristina Castro, state senator from the 22nd district
- Kate Daniels, member of the Democratic State Central Committee
- Vera Davis, wife of U.S. representative Danny Davis
- Will Davis, state representative from the 30th district
- Loretta Durbin, lobbyist and wife of U.S. Senator Dick Durbin
- Angelica Guerrero-Cuellar, state representative from the 22nd district
- Hoan Huynh, state representative from the 13th district
- Paul Kendrick, executive director of the Democratic campaign group Rust Belt Rising.
- Elizabeth Lindquist, member of the Democratic State Central Committee
- Mariah McGuire, state employee
- Vivian Robinson, member of the Illinois Civil Service Commission
- Bobby Rush, former U.S. representative from the 1st congressional district (1993-2023) and Chicago councilman from the 2nd ward (1983-93)
- Smita Shah, businesswoman and former national Democratic Party leader
- Maurice West, state representative from the 67th district
- Kristina Zahorik, member of the Democratic State Central Committee

== Indiana ==
Electors: 11, pledged to vote for Donald Trump for President and JD Vance for Vice President:

- Don Bates, former candidate for Congress, State Treasurer
- George E. Brown, former judge, LaGrange County
- State Senator Jim Buck, Kokomo
- Brenda Goff, chair 8th CD Republicans
- Lisa J. Hanner-Robinson, MD, Physician
- Erin Lucas, Indiana State Party Chair
- State Representative Julie A. McGuire, Indianapolis
- Martin E. Obst, Indianapolis, political consultant, advisor to Mike Pence, replaced by Tyler D. Warman, Indianapolis
- Michael D. Simpson, Chair, Porter County Republicans
- Allen L. Stevens, Chair, LaPorte County Republicans
- former State Senator Carlin J. Yoder, Fortville

== Iowa ==
Electors: 6, pledged to vote for Donald Trump for President and JD Vance for Vice President:

- Leanne Pellett (at-large), Chair, Cass County Republicans
- Steve Scheffler (at-large), RNC member
- Merle Miller (1st district), Chair, Washington County Republicans
- Justin Wasson (2nd district), candidate for State Senate, District 42
- Jack Vanderflught (3rd district), Chair, Clarke County Republicans
- Garrison Oppman (4th district)

== Kansas ==
Electors: 6, pledged to vote for Donald Trump for President and JD Vance for Vice President:

- Mike Brown, chair of the Kansas Republican Party
- Kristi Brown, wife of Mike Brown
- Maria Holiday, chair of the Johnson County Republican Party
- Mark Kahrs, state representative from the 87th district
- Cheryl Reynolds, vice chair of the Kansas Republican Party
- Alan Townsend, treasurer of the Kansas Republican Party

== Kentucky ==
Electors: 8, pledged to vote for Donald Trump for President and JD Vance for Vice President:

- Catherine Bell (at-large), Treasurer of the Kentucky Republican Party
- Bob Mitchell (at-large), former district director to Rep. Hal Rogers
- Robert Taylor (1st district), treasurer to the Republican Party of Kentucky's First Congressional District
- John Reed (2nd district)
- Phyllis Causey (3rd district), former Chair of the Warren County Republican Party
- Bob Hutchison (4th district), businessman, major Republican donor, and Chair of the Johnson County School Board
- James Stansbury (5th district), chair of the Jefferson County Republican Party
- James Howell (6th district)

== Louisiana ==
Electors: 8, pledged to vote for Donald Trump for President and JD Vance for Vice President:

- Christian Gil (at-large), deputy chairman of the Louisiana Republican Party
- Randolph August Bazet III (at-large)
- Raymond M. Griffin Jr. (1st district)
- Lloyd A. Harsch (2nd district)
- Luke Anthony Dupre (3rd district), Parish Attorney of Acadia Parish
- Matthew Kay (4th district), alternate RNC delegate
- Phillipp Jeffrey Bedwell (5th district)
- Carl W. Benedict (6th district)

== Maine ==
Electors: 4, 3 pledged to vote for Kamala Harris for President and Tim Walz for Vice President:

- Jill Duson, state senator from the 28th district (at-large)
- Betty Johnson (at-large), Waldo County Commissioner
- Jay Philbrick (1st district), member of the Maine Juvenile Justice Advisory Group

1 pledged to vote for Donald Trump for President and JD Vance for Vice President:

- Joel Stetkis (2nd district), chair of Maine's state Republican party. Stetkis was voted out as chair on January 11.

== Maryland ==
Electors: 10, pledged to vote for Kamala Harris for President and Tim Walz for Vice President:

- Michael Cryor, former chair of the Maryland Democratic Party
- Charlene Dukes, first vice chair of the Maryland Democratic Party
- Kris Fair, state delegate from the 3rd district
- Aruna Miller, Lieutenant Governor of Maryland
- Jessica Nichols, teacher
- Stuart Pittman, county executive of Anne Arundel County
- David Salazar, member of the Calvert County Democratic Central Committee
- Thomas Slater, former member of the Frederick County Democratic Committee
- Judy Wixted, second vice chair of the Maryland Democratic Party
- Charlotte Wood, associate professor

== Massachusetts ==
Electors: 11, pledged to vote for Kamala Harris for President and Tim Walz for Vice President:

- Jeremy Comeau, Massachusetts Democratic Party Committeemember
- Brian J. Corr, Massachusetts Democratic Party Committeemember and executive director of the Cambridge Peace Commission and Cambridge Police Review Board
- Eileen R. Duff, Governor's Councilor for the 5th district 2013-2025, Register of Deeds-elect for Southern Essex County
- Marsha Finkelstein, board member of the North Andover Housing Authority and Member of the Massachusetts Democratic Party State Committee
- Lida E. Harkins, former state representative for the Norfolk 13th district (1989-2011)
- Thomas J. Holloway
- Martin F. Kaine III
- Marilyn Flowers Marion, chair of the Retired Teachers chapter of the Boston Teachers Union
- Tanya V. Neslusan, executive director of MassEquality
- Kaveesh Pathak, Student at Northeastern University
- Sharon Stout, chair of the Newton Democratic Party and Massachusetts Democratic Party committee member

== Michigan ==
Electors: 15, pledged to vote for Donald Trump for President and JD Vance for Vice President:

- Hank Choate, 2020 fake elector
- Amy Facchinello, 2020 fake elector
- Linda Glisman, City Commissioner, LaPeer
- Lance Elliott Griffin, businessman
- John Haggard, 2020 fake elector
- Darlene Hennessy, Dearborn Heights
- Peter Hoekstra, chair of the Michigan Republican Party
- Timothy King, 2020 fake elector
- Meshawn Maddock, 2020 fake elector and former co-chair of the Michigan Republican Party (2021–23)
- Andrew Sebolt, 2022 legislative candidate (District 102)
- Marian Sheridan, 2020 fake elector
- Jim Tokarski, Rochester Hills
- Phillip A. Wagner
- Jason Woolford, State Representative (District 50)
- David Yardley, Saint Joseph, political consultant and legislative staffer

== Minnesota ==
Electors: 10, pledged to vote for Kamala Harris for President and Tim Walz for Vice President:

- Deb Hogenson, former director of the Minnesota DFL
- Ken Wilson
- Ardis Wexler, campaign manager
- Andrena Guines, vice chair of the DFL of the CF4 district
- Elizer Darris, advocate
- Buzz Snyder
- Alan Perish, member of the Minnesota Board on Aging
- Joseph Boyle
- Mary Murphy, former Minnesota State Representative
- Elvis Rivera, member of the Minnesota Council on Latin Affairs

== Mississippi ==
Electors: 6, pledged to vote for Donald Trump for President and JD Vance for Vice President:

- Chris Brown, member of the Mississippi Public Service Commission from the Northern district and former state representative from the 20th district (2012-24)
- Phil Bryant, former governor of Mississippi (2012-20)
- Tyler McCaughn, state senator from the 31st district
- Terry Reeves, father of governor Tate Reeves
- Benjamin Suber, state senator from the 8th district
- Charles Stephenson, member of the Board of Trustees of the Mississippi Institutions of Higher Learning

== Missouri ==
Electors: 10, pledged to vote for Donald Trump for President and JD Vance for Vice President:

- Joseph T. Brazil (at-large)
- Bev Ehlen (at-large), director, Concerned Women for America
- Shaun Broeker (1st district), St Louis, attorney
- Roger Jackson (2nd district), Vice Chair, Franklin County
- William Charles Eigel (3rd district), former State Senator
- Jennifer E. Spena (4th district), State Committee member
- Thomas J. Salisbury (5th district), staffer, Senator Blunt
- Chancie (Dean) Brookshier (6th district), congressional staffer
- William Dane Roaseau (7th district), Ozark Mountain Energies
- Matthew W. Henson (8th district), Cape Girardeau County Chair

== Montana ==
Electors: 4, pledged to vote for Donald Trump for President and JD Vance for Vice President:

- Jeffrey Essmann, Billings, former State Senator
- Debra Lamm, former chair of the Montana Republican Party and state representative from the 60th district
- Theron Nelson, State Party Secretary
- Becky Stockton, Helena, 2020 elector

== Nebraska ==
Electors: 5

4 pledged to vote for Donald Trump for President and JD Vance for Vice President:

- Fanchon L. Blythe (at-large), RNC Committee member
- Jason W. Hayes (at-large), attorney and lobbyist
- J.L. Spray (1st district), RNC Committee member
- Christine M. Vail (3rd district), Chair 3rd CD Republicans

1 pledged to vote for Kamala Harris for President and Tim Walz for Vice President:

- Peg Lippert (2nd district)

== Nevada ==
Electors: 6, pledged to vote for Donald Trump for President and JD Vance for Vice President:

- Brian Hardy, attorney, Las Vegas
- Jesse Law, chair of the Clark County Republican Party and 2020 fake elector
- Michael J. McDonald, chair of the Nevada Republican Party and 2020 fake elector
- Kathryn Njus, State Party Treasurer
- Bruce Parks, Chair, Washoe County Republicans
- Robert Tyree, Executive Director, Nevada Republican Party

== New Hampshire ==
Electors: 4, pledged to vote for Kamala Harris for President and Tim Walz for Vice President:

- Gerri Cannon, New Hampshire State Representative
- Eva Castillo-Turgeon, immigrant's rights activist
- Latha Mangipudi, New Hampshire State Representative
- Jackie Weatherspoon, former New Hampshire State Representative and Department of State staffer

== New Jersey ==
Electors: 14, pledged to vote for Kamala Harris for President and Tim Walz for Vice President:

- Saily M. Avelenda, former Executive Director of the Democratic State Committee of New Jersey
- Charles Boddy, chair of the Warren Party Democratic Committee
- John Currie, chair of the Passaic County Democratic Committee and former chair of the Democratic State Committee of New Jersey
- Dyese Davis, chair of the Monmouth County Democratic Party and Chief of Staff to State Sen. Vin Gopal
- Parimal Garg, former Chief Counsel to Governor Phil Murphy
- Yazminelly Gonzalez, Trenton councilmember
- Robyn Grodner, lawyer and businesswoman
- Jacqueline Jones, former Assistant Commissioner for Early Childhood Education in the New Jersey Department of Education
- Philip Kramer, mayor of Franklin
- Margaret Martin, Chief Operating Officer of the New Jersey Democratic State Committee
- David A. Matos, Jr., former Special Assistant to the Governor and former Chief of Staff to the New Jersey Attorney General
- Ian D. Mosley, New Jersey Democratic State Committee Member
- Ellen Park, state assemblywoman
- Mildred S. Scott, Middlesex County sheriff

== New Mexico ==
Electors: 5, pledged to vote for Kamala Harris for President and Tim Walz for Vice President:

- Harold Murphree
- Julie Rochman, Treasurer of the New Mexico Democratic Party
- Aleta Suazo, vice-chair of the Sandoval County Democratic Party
- Patricia Gaston, former President of Women Veterans of New Mexico
- Daniel Diaz

== New York ==
Electors: 28, pledged to vote for Kamala Harris for President and Tim Walz for Vice President:

- Eric Adams, mayor of New York City
- Mohammed Akber Alam, New York state DNC affiliate
- Stuart Appelbaum, trade union leader and president of the Retail, Wholesale and Department Store Union and of the Jewish Labor Committee
- Byron Brown, mayor of Buffalo
- Mario Cilento, president of the New York AFL-CIO
- Michelle Crentsil, political director of the New York State Nurses Association
- Antonio Delgado, lieutenant governor and former U.S. representative from the 19th district (2019-22)
- Thomas DiNapoli, New York State Comptroller and former state assemblyman from the 16th district
- Hazel Nell Dukes, activist and former president of the NAACP (1990-92)
- Thomas Garry, attorney
- Vanessa Gibson, borough president of The Bronx, former New York City councilwoman from the 16th district (2014-21) and state assemblywoman from the 77th district (2009-13)
- George Gresham, president of 1199SEIU United Healthcare Workers East
- Carl Heastie, state assemblyman from the 83rd district and Speaker of the Assembly
- Kathy Hochul, governor of New York, former lieutenant governor (2015-21) and U.S. representative from the 26th district (2011-13)
- Jay Jacobs, chair of the New York State Democratic Party
- Letitia James, attorney general of New York, former New York City Public Advocate (2014-18) and New York City councilwoman from the 35th district (2004-13)
- Gary LaBarbera, labor leader and president of the Building and Construction Trades Council of Greater New York (BCTC) and of the New York State Building and Construction Trades Council
- Carolyn Maloney, former U.S. representative from the 12th (2013-23) and 14th (1993-2013) congressional districts, and New York City councilwoman from the 4th (1992-93) and 8th (1983-91) districts
- Luis A. Miranda Jr., political strategist, philanthropist, advocacy consultant, and author
- Crystal Peoples-Stokes, state assemblywoman from the 141st district and Majority Leader of the state assembly
- Christine Quinn, former New York City councilwoman from the 3rd district (1999-2013) and Speaker of the City Council (2006-13)
- Kathy Sheehan, mayor of Albany
- Anastasia Somoza, disability rights advocate
- Andrea Stewart-Cousins, state senator from the 35th district and Majority Leader of the state senate
- Gerard J. Sweeney, attorney
- Sandra Ung, New York City councilwoman from the 20th district
- Latrice Walker, state assemblywoman from the 55th district
- Randi Weingarten, labor leader, educator, president of the American Federation of Teachers and former president of the United Federation of Teachers (1998-2008)

== North Carolina ==
Electors: 16, pledged to vote for Donald Trump for President and JD Vance for Vice President:

- Susan Mills, vice chair of the North Carolina Republican Party (at-large)
- Jason Simmons, chair of the North Carolina Republican Party (at-large)
- Kimberly Cotten-West, vice chair of the Washington County Republican Party (1st district)
- Susan Phillips, legislative assistant for state representative Jay Adams (2nd district)
- Stephanie Broughton, vice president of the Coastal Region for the North Carolina Federation of Republican Women (3rd district)
- Thomas Glendinning, former North Carolina Senate candidate (4th district)
- Deanna Marie De’Liberto, president of Election Integrity NJ (5th district)
- David Gleeson, chair of the Guilford County Republican Party (6th district)
- Helen Pannullo, secretary of the Brunswick County Republican Party (7th district)
- Daniel Barry, former U.S. House candidate (8th district)
- Rick Smith, chair of the Randolph County Republican Party (9th district)
- Leisa Rowe, 2nd vice chair for Precinct Organization and Activism at the Iredell County Republican Party (10th district)
- Roxan Wenzel (11th district)
- Ernest Wittenborn, Jr., delegate to 2016 Republican National Convention (12th district)
- Michael Magnanti, former U.S. House candidate (13th district)
- Bryson Smith (14th district)

== North Dakota ==
Electors: 3, pledged to vote for Donald Trump for President and JD Vance for Vice President:

- Kim Koppelman, past speaker of the North Dakota House of Representatives
- Jeff Magrum, member of the North Dakota Senate
- Rick Becker, past member of the North Dakota House of Representatives

== Ohio ==
Electors: 17, pledged to vote for Donald Trump for President and JD Vance for Vice President:

- Diane Cunningham Redden, Hamilton County Chair
- Timothy Inwood, former State Senate candidate
- Meredith Freedhoff, Franklin County Chair
- Keith Cheney, Ohio Central Committee member
- Gina Campbell, Findlay, Ohio Central Committee member
- Dave Johnson, Columbiana County Chair
- Darrell Scott, Cleveland Heights, minister
- Richard Jones, Butler County Sheriff
- James Brennan
- Robert Scott, Kettering County Clerk of Courts
- Steve Loomis, former president, Cleveland police union
- Joy Padgett, former state senator from the 20th district (2004-08) and state representative from the 95th district (1993-99)
- Jane Timken, RNC member, former chair Ohio State Party
- Janet Cafaro, major contributor to Republicans
- Michelle Anderson, Ohio Central Committee member
- Robert Paduchik, advisor to Donald Trump
- Alex Triantafilou, chair of the Ohio Republican Party

== Oklahoma ==
Electors: 7, pledged to vote for Donald Trump for President and JD Vance for Vice President:

- Roderic Perkins (at-large), Tulsa
- Don Spencer (at-large), gun rights advocate
- Karen Hardin (1st district), leader of Awake Oklahoma
- Paul Palmer (2nd district), former legislative candidate, District 15
- State Representative Sean Roberts (3rd district)
- Melinda Daugherty (4th district), Federation of Republican Women
- Bryan Morris (5th district)

== Oregon ==
Electors: 8, pledged to vote for Kamala Harris for President and Tim Walz for Vice President:

- Angelo Arredondo Baca, former Salem Human Rights Commissioner
- Michael Radway, former Treasurer of the Oregon Democratic Party and former Chief of Staff to the Chair of the National Credit Union Administration
- Rosa Colquitt, chair of the Oregon Democratic Party
- Kim Schmith, vice chair of the Oregon Democratic Party
- Kate Flanagan
- Nathan Joseph Soltz, secretary of the Oregon Democratic party and youngest ever presidential elector in 2020
- Laura Gillpatrick, vice-chair of the Lane County Democratic Party and field organizer
- Jerred Taylor

== Pennsylvania ==
Electors: 19, pledged to vote for Donald Trump for President and JD Vance for Vice President:

- Bill Bachenberg, businessman and 2020 fake elector
- Vallerie Biancaniello, RNC delegate
- Curt Coccodrilli, 2020 fake elector and former Pennsylvania director of rural development for the United States Department of Agriculture
- Bernadette Comfort, vice chair of the Pennsylvania Republican Party and 2020 fake elector
- Robert Gleason, slated 2020 fake elector and former chair of the Pennsylvania Republican Party (2006-17) and Secretary of the Commonwealth under ex-Gov. Dick Thornburgh (1985-87)
- Joyce Haas, political consultant and former vice chair of the Pennsylvania Republican Party
- Fred Keller, former U.S. congressman from the 12th district (2019-23) and state representative from the 85th district (2011-19)
- Ash Khare, member of the Warren County Republican Committee and 2020 fake elector
- Jondavid Longo, mayor of Slippery Rock and Pennsylvania chair of Early Vote Action
- Robin Medeiros, former president of the Margery Scranton Council of Republican Women and regional director for the Pennsylvania Federation of Republican Women
- Rochelle Pasquariello, Carbon County Republican Committee member
- Patricia Poprik, Bucks County Republican Committee chair and 2020 fake elector
- Andrew Reilly, 2020 fake elector and former Delaware County councilman and RNC national committeeman
- Lynne Ryan, chair of the Lawrence County Republican Committee
- Carla Sands, former U.S. ambassador to Denmark and unsuccessful 2022 U.S. Senate candidate
- Jim Vasilko, Republican National Convention delegate
- T. Lynette Villano, member of the Republican State Committee
- Christine Wilkins, former Stroud Township supervisor
- Jim Worthington, Newtown Athletic Club owner and chair of the Pennsylvania delegation at the 2024 Republican National Convention

== Rhode Island ==
Electors: 4, pledged to vote for Kamala Harris for President and Tim Walz for Vice President:

- Darlene Mary Allen, CEO and Executive Director of Adoption Rhode Island
- Robert Britto, state senator from the 18th district
- George Nee, former president of the Rhode Island AFL-CIO
- Ami Manilal Gada, school teacher and wife of state house Majority Leader Christopher Blazejewski

== South Carolina ==
Electors: 9, pledged to vote for Donald Trump for President and JD Vance for Vice President:

- Cindy Costa (at-large), RNC Committee member
- Drew McKissick (at-large), State Chair
- Xiaodan Li (1st district), Beaufort County Committeeman
- Tyson Grinstead (2nd district), Richland County Chair
- Susan Aiken (3rd district), Chair of 3rd CD
- Alexia Newman (4th district), Spartan County Committeewoman
- William Oden (5th district), Sumter County Chair
- Moye Graham (6th district), Clarendon County Chair
- Michael Connett (7th district)

== South Dakota ==
Electors: 3, pledged to vote for Donald Trump for President and JD Vance for Vice President:

- Marty Jackley, Attorney General of South Dakota
- Kristi Noem, Governor of South Dakota
- Larry Rhoden, Lieutenant Governor of South Dakota

== Tennessee ==
Electors: 11, pledged to vote for Donald Trump for President and JD Vance for Vice President:

Most of the electors are member of the State Executive Committee of the Republican Party.

- Lee Beaman, major car dealer from Nashville
- Emily Beaty
- Linda D. Buckles
- Jane Chedester
- Larry Hillis
- Charlotte Kelley, Vice Chair, Tennessee Republican Party
- Ron McDow
- Tina McElravey
- Lee Mills
- Terri Nicholson
- Jim Sandman

== Texas ==
Electors: 40, pledged to vote for Donald Trump for President and JD Vance for Vice President:

- James Buntrock, executive director of My God Votes and advisor to the Harris County GOP - CD 38
- Caitlyn Burge, former staff assistant for U.S. Representative Beth Van Duyne - CD 33
- Christopher Daniel - At Large
- Timothy Davis, councilman from Temple, Texas - CD 24
- Christopher Douglas DeCluitt chairman of the McLennan County Republican Party - At Large
- James Dickey, former chair of the Republican Party of Texas (2017-20) - CD 10
- Devvie Duke, chairwoman of the Election Integrity Committee of the Republican Party of Texas - CD 17
- Andrew Eller - CD 31
- Steve Evans, chairman of the Lubbock County Republican Party - CD 19
- David Gerdts - CD 11
- Merrylynn Gerstenschlager, national security chair of Texas Egal Forum - CD 12
- Ferrando Heyward, retired naval officer - CD 28
- George Hindman, aerospace engineer and 2020 Congressional Candidate for Texas's 17th congressional district - CD 35
- Peyton Inge - CD 26
- Lora Lane - CD 21
- Kaden Mattingly, college student - CD 5
- John McLeon - CD 23
- Evelyn Montalvo, nurse and former precinct chair - CD 22
- Amy Mundy - CD 27
- Tammie Nielsen - CD 29
- Sean O'Brien - CD 15
- Christopher Paxton, an attorney from The Woodlands, Texas, former staffer in the Texas Legislature - CD 2
- Robin Perez - CD 36
- Adam Petruszka - CD 18
- Kathy Ponce, Maypearl, Texas Economic Development Corporation Board Member - CD 6
- Cruz Quintana - CD 34
- Sue Reeves - CD 3
- Kathy Rogers - CD 14
- Mark Russell - CD 4
- Nannette Samuelson, Hood County Commissioner
- Hans Sassenfeld - CD 16
- Selina Sauter - CD 9
- Kyle Sinclair - CD 20
- Gary Singleton - CD 1
- Deon Starnes, state legislative staffer, former Committeewoman of SD30 to the Republican Party of Texas, former Executive Director of the Denton County, Texas Republican Party - CD 13
- Robert Sumicek - CD 7
- Patricia Cherry Tibbs, president of the Montgomery County, Texas Tea Party - CD 8
- Karl Voigtsberger - CD 32
- Harry Zenner - CD 30
- Chad Zepemick - CD 37

== Utah ==
Electors: 6, pledged to vote for Donald Trump for President and JD Vance for Vice President:

- Britshana Barfuss, Davis County Republicans
- Trent Christensen, former candidate for UT Attorney General
- Jordan Hess, former candidate for Congress
- Kris Kimball, former UT Board of Education candidate
- Kristen Small, activist in Salt Lake City
- Gina Worthen, former county supervisor

== Vermont ==
Electors: 3, pledged to vote for Kamala Harris for President and Tim Walz for Vice President:

- Stephen Amos, former Secretary of the Vermont Democratic Party
- Timothy Jennan
- Mary Sullivan, former state representative from the Chittenden 6-5 district (2014-20)

== Virginia ==
Electors: 13, pledged to vote for Kamala Harris for President and Tim Walz for Vice President:

- Susan Bates Hippen, Virginia Beach Planning Commissioner (at-large)
- Susan Reid Swecker, chair of the Democratic Party of Virginia (at-large)
- Alan Hamilton Kennedy, attorney (1st district)
- Jeffrey A. Breit, attorney (2nd district)
- David Brian Washington (3rd district)
- Elizabeth Vedernikova Khanna, former President of the Metro Richmond Young Democrats (4th district)
- Gary Davis Schatz (5th district)
- Dorothy S. Blackwell (6th district)
- Joseph Odell Smith III (7th district)
- David Jacob Leichtman (8th district)
- Jerrell Wayne Saleeby (9th district)
- Koran Terry Saines, member of the Loudon County Board of Supervisors (10th district)
- Christopher Joseph Ambrose (11th district)

== Washington ==
Electors: 12, pledged to vote for Kamala Harris for President and Tim Walz for Vice President:

- Monica Chilton, chair of the Snohomish County Democratic Party
- Lona Wilbur, DNC member
- John Thompson
- Patricia Whitefoot, indigenous activist and former member of the Yakama Nation Tribal Council
- Larry Ludwig, Stevens County, Washington Committeeman to the Washington Democratic Party
- Julie Johnson, Clallam County, Washington Committeewoman to the Washington Democratic Party
- Tara Gallagher, State Committee member
- Alma Chacon, executive director of Community for the Advancement of Family Education
- Sharon Mast, DNC committeemember
- Patti Dailey, union leader and former Secretary of the Pierce County, Washington Democratic Party
- Justin Camarata, former Interim Tacoma City Councilor
- Nathaniel Block, Skagit County Deputy Prosecuting Attorney

== West Virginia ==
Electors: 4, pledged to vote for Donald Trump for President and JD Vance for Vice President:

- Benjean Rapp, Member of Republican Committee
- Melody Potter, Former Chairwoman of West Virginia Republican Executive Committee
- John Overington, Former member of West Virginia House of Delegates
- Rick W. Modesitt, Former member of West Virginia House of Delegates, Former Wood County Commissioner, Member West Virginia State Republican Executive Committee.

== Wisconsin ==
Electors: 10, pledged to vote for Donald Trump for President and JD Vance for Vice President:

- Doug Haag, Republican member of Milwaukee Election Commission
- Julie Helmer, Vice Chair, 2nd Congressional District
- Charlotte Rasmussen, Chair, Wisconsin Federation of Republican Women
- Angie Sapik, state representative from the 73rd district
- Jim Schildbach, Vice Chair, 5th Congressional District
- Brian Schimming, chairman of the Republican Party of Wisconsin
- Hannah Testin, wife of state senator Patrick Testin
- Tommy Thompson, former governor of Wisconsin (1987-2001)
- Eric Toney, Fond du Lac County prosecutor and 2022 nominee for Attorney General of Wisconsin
- Katie Verzal, Vice Chair, First Congressional District

== Wyoming ==
Electors: 3, pledged to vote for Donald Trump for President and JD Vance for Vice President:

- Brent Bien, retired colonel and civil engineer
- Marti Halverson, former state representative from the 22nd district
- Bryan Miller, chair of the Sheridan County Republican Party

== See also ==
- Timeline of the 2024 United States presidential election
- Federalist Papers

Preceded by 2020	Electoral College (United States); 2024	Succeeded by 2028
