= Kathy Dahlkemper =

American politician (born 1957)

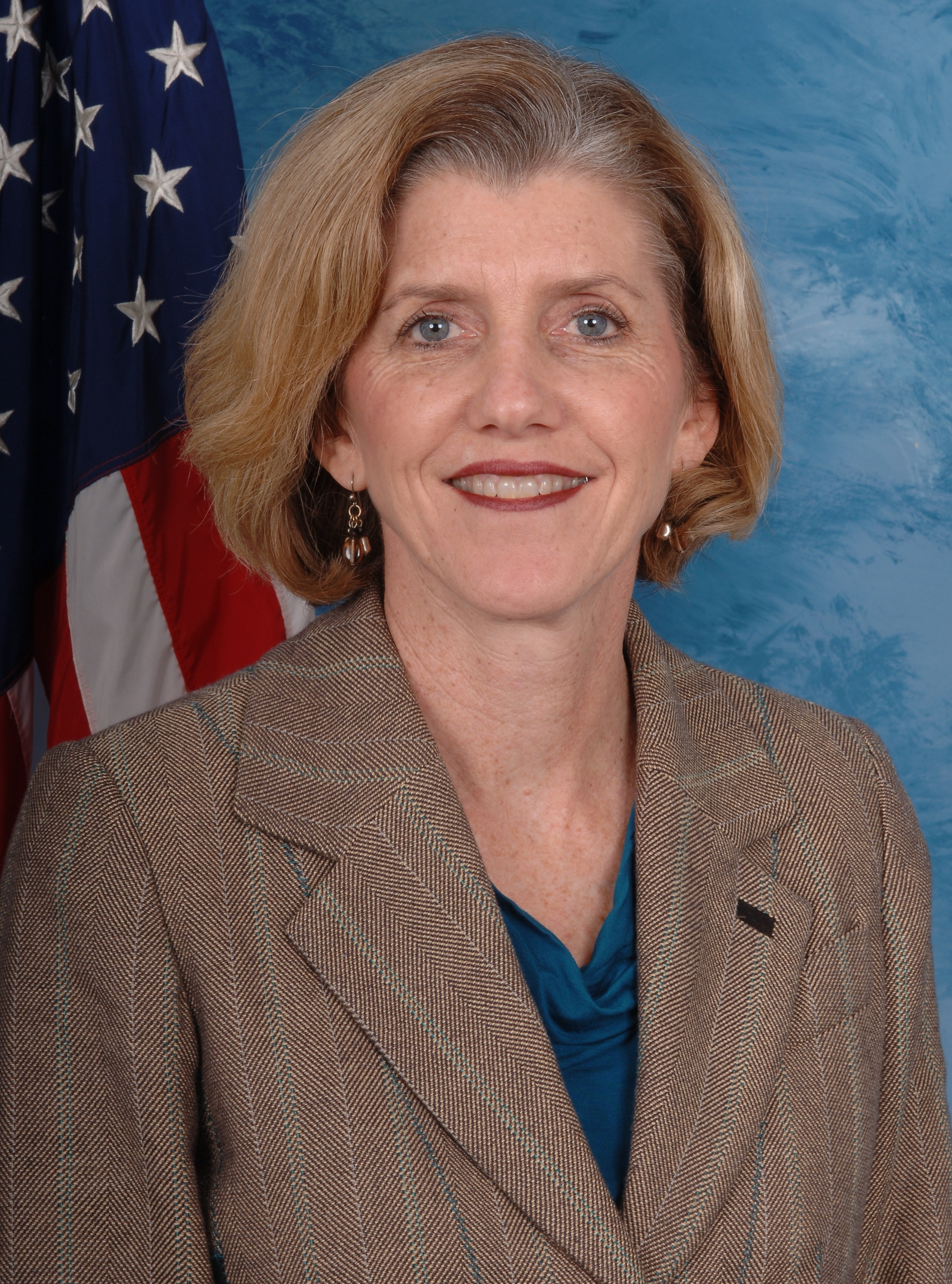

Executive of Erie County
- In office January 6, 2014 – January 3, 2022
- Preceded by: Barry Grossman
- Succeeded by: Brenton Davis

Member of the U.S. House of Representatives from Pennsylvania's 3rd district
- In office January 3, 2009 – January 3, 2011
- Preceded by: Phil English
- Succeeded by: Mike Kelly

Personal details
- Born: Kathleen Ann Steenberge; December 10, 1957 (age 68) Erie, Pennsylvania, U.S.
- Party: Democratic
- Spouse: Dan Dahlkemper
- Children: 5
- Education: Edinboro University (BS)

Kathleen Ann Dahlkemper (née Steenberge; born December 10, 1957) is an American politician. A member of the Democratic Party, she was elected the county executive of Erie County, Pennsylvania in 2013 and served as the U.S. representative for Pennsylvania's 3rd congressional district from 2009 to 2011.

== Early life and education ==
Dahlkemper was born Kathleen Ann Steenberge in Erie, one of seven children of Carl W. and M. Janet Clarke Steenberge. She graduated in 1982 from Edinboro State College (now PennWest Edinboro) with a degree in dietetics.

== Early career ==
After graduating, she worked as a clinical dietician for over 20 years, initially in Houston, Texas, and later in the Erie area. Since 1997, she has been part-owner, human resources manager, and special projects director of Dahlkemper Landscape Architects and Contractors, a major landscaping firm in the area. Also, she is a co-founder and director of the Lake Erie Arboretum at Frontier Park.

== U.S. House of Representatives ==
=== Committee assignments ===
- Committee on Agriculture
  - Subcommittee on Conservation, Credit, Energy, and Research
  - Subcommittee on Department Operations, Oversight, Nutrition and Forestry
- Committee on Science and Technology
  - Subcommittee on Investigations and Oversight
- Committee on Small Business
  - Subcommittee on Regulations, Healthcare and Trade (Chairwoman)
  - Subcommittee on Rural and Urban Entrepreneurship

=== Tenure ===
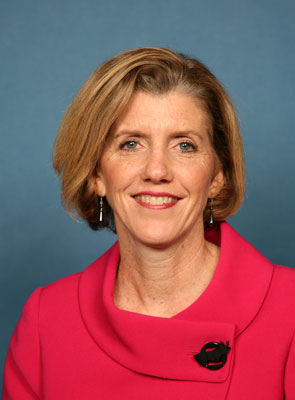
Dahlkemper during the 111th Congress

Dahlkemper was a member of the Blue Dog Coalition. She supported the repeal of the "Don't Ask, Don't Tell" policy for the armed forces, and was a co-sponsor of the Employee Free Choice Act, also known as "Card check". Dahlkemper identifies as "pro-life", and was the "Hall of Fame" Award recipient at the 2009 Conference of Democrats for Life of America, an anti-abortion advocacy group. She supported the Stupak-Pitts Amendment, an anti-abortion amendment to America's Affordable Health Care Act of 2009 (HR 3962), but later voted in favor of the Patient Protection and Affordable Care Act after President Obama issued an executive order that barred the use of federal funds for abortions.

== Political campaigns ==
=== 2008 congressional campaign ===
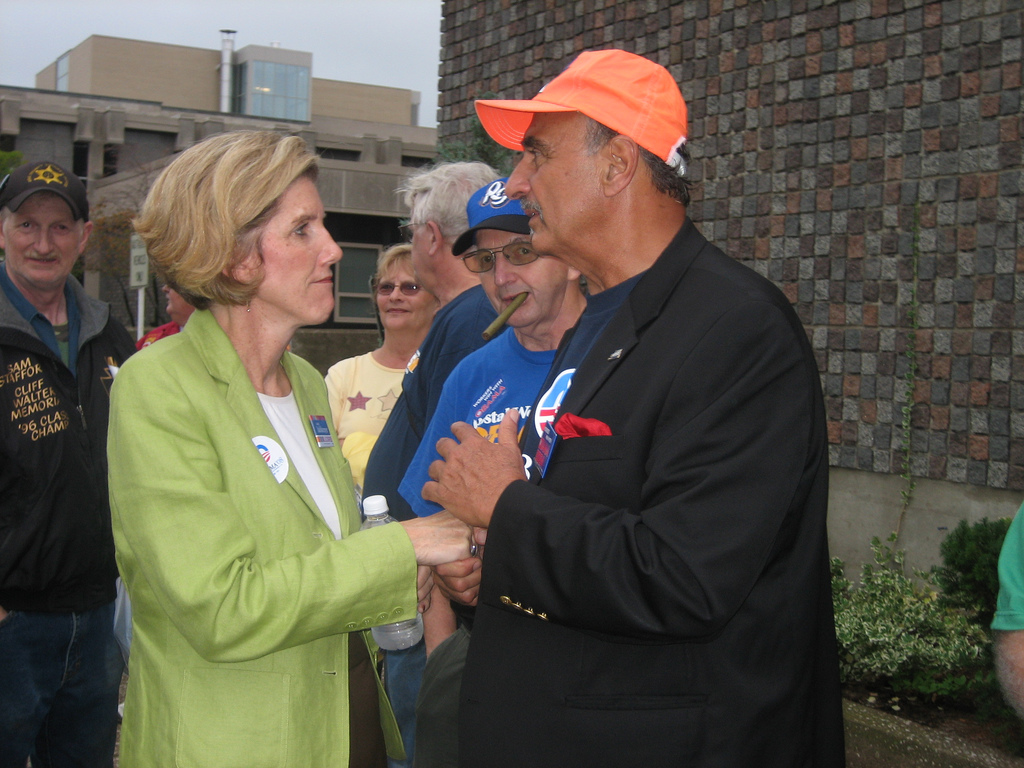
Dahlkemper and Pennsylvania AFL-CIO President Bill George on September 13, 2008

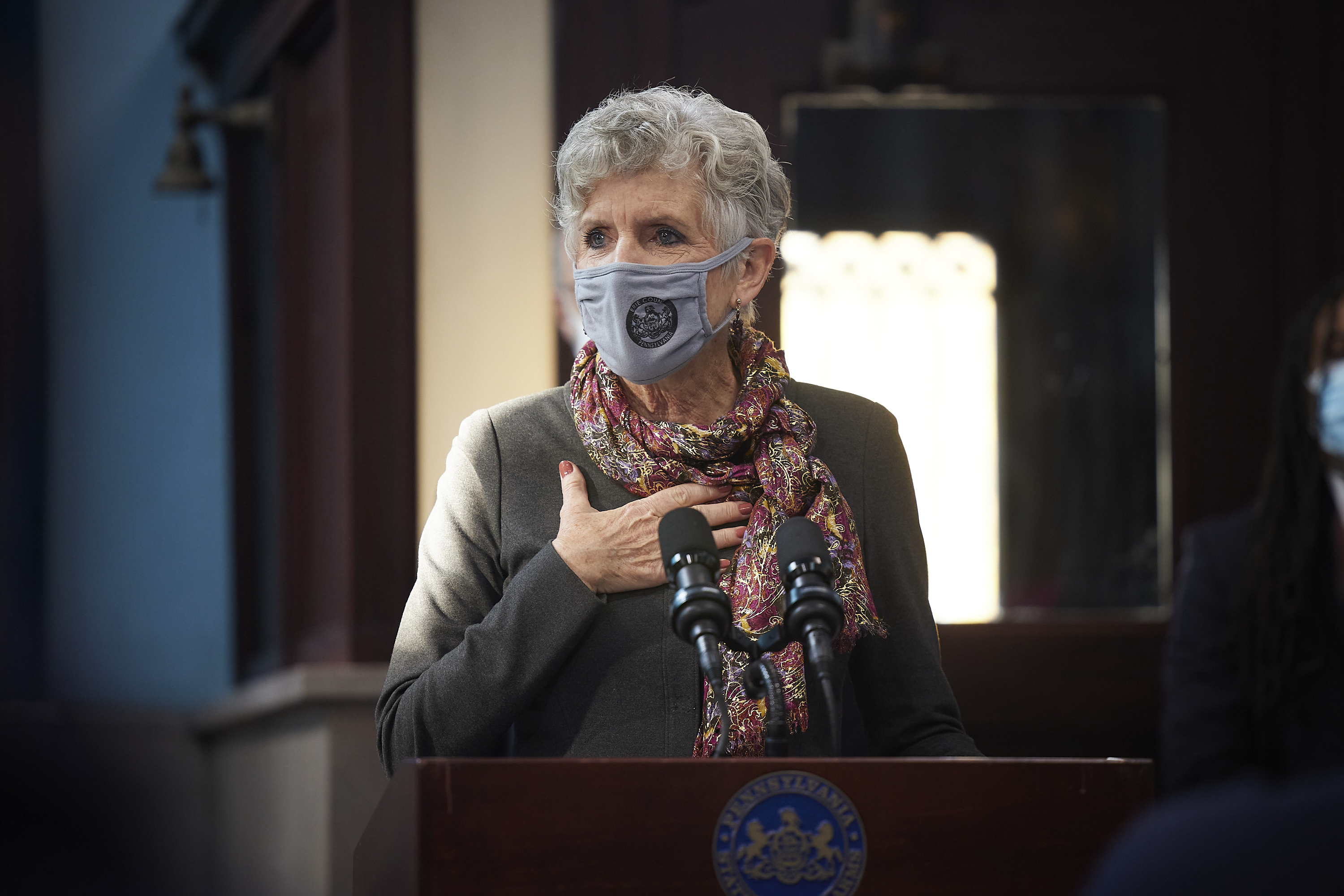
Dahlkemper speaking with the press in November 2021

Dahlkemper announced her candidacy for the Democratic nomination for the 3rd District in October 2007. As a first-time candidate for political office, she won the primary by an unexpectedly wide 19-point margin.

In the general election, Dahlkemper faced seven-term Republican incumbent Phil English. During the campaign, she attacked English for breaking his original promise to only serve six terms in Congress, and also tied him to the Bush administration. She raised $872,000 to English's $2.2 million, but was aided by large spending by the Democratic Congressional Campaign Committee. In the November election, Dahlkemper won in an upset, taking 51.2 percent of the vote to English's 48.8 percent. Though she won only two of the district's seven counties (Erie and Mercer), Dahlkemper secured victory by running up a large margin in Erie County, which she won by nearly 16,000 votes.

Dahlkemper was the first Democrat to represent the 3rd and its predecessors since Joseph Vigorito was toppled by Marc L. Marks in 1976, and only the third Democrat to represent the district since 1893. Although the district is anchored by heavily Democratic Erie, the largest city in the district (no other city has more than 17,000 people), it has historically elected moderate Republicans (most notably Tom Ridge, who represented it from 1983 to 1995).

Dahlkemper was the first woman to represent northwest Pennsylvania in the House, and was one of two women in the 19-member delegation from Pennsylvania, the other being Allyson Schwartz of the Philadelphia area.

Her husband, Dan, was elected the first male President of the Congressional Spouses’ freshman class in 2009.

=== 2010 congressional re-election campaign ===
Dahlkemper was defeated by Republican Mike Kelly, a car dealer from the far southern portion of the district by 11.4%, the highest margin of defeat for any incumbent congressperson from Pennsylvania in 2010. While she carried Erie County, she lost badly in the rest of the district. Since Dahlkemper left office, a Democrat has come within single digits in the district, now numbered as the 16th District, only twice.

=== 2013 Erie County executive campaign ===
In March 2013, Dahlkemper announced her candidacy for Erie County executive, challenging incumbent Democrat Barry Grossman. She defeated Grossman in the May 21 Democratic primary with 52% of the vote. In the November general election, Dahlkemper defeated Republican nominee Don Tucci, winning 57% of the vote. She took office as county executive on January 6, 2014.

=== 2017 Erie County executive campaign ===
Dahlkemper ran for reelection in 2017, winning by 307 votes, with 50.15 percent of the vote over her Republican opponent, Art Oligeri, who garnered 49.64 percent. She weathered a strong tide against her in the county's more conservative eastern portion.

== Personal life ==
Dahlkemper married her first husband while in college; they divorced when the marriage became abusive, and she raised her son as a single mother on food stamp assistance. She later married Dan Dahlkemper, who adopted her son; they had four additional children.

== Electoral history ==
Pennsylvania's 3rd Congressional District Election, 2008
Party	Candidate	Votes	%
Democratic	Kathy Dahlkemper	146,846	51.2
Republican	Phil English (incumbent)	139,757	48.8
Total votes		286,603	100.0
Democratic gain from Republican			

Pennsylvania's 3rd Congressional District Election, 2010
Party	Candidate	Votes	%
Republican	Mike Kelly	109,909	55.7
Democratic	Kathy Dahlkemper (incumbent)	88,924	44.3
Total votes		197,320	100.0
Republican gain from Democratic			

Erie County Executive Election, 2013
Party	Candidate	Votes	%
Democratic	Kathy Dahlkemper	31,391	57.3
Republican	Don Tucci	23,436	42.7
Total votes		54,827	100.0
Democratic hold			

Erie County Executive Election, 2017
Party	Candidate	Votes	%
Democratic	Kathy Dahlkemper (incumbent)	30,454	50.3
Republican	Art Oligeri	30,150	49.7
Total votes		60,604	100.0
Democratic hold			

== See also ==
- Women in the United States House of Representatives

U.S. House of Representatives
Preceded by Phil English	Member of the U.S. House of Representatives from Pennsylvania's 3rd congressional district 2009–2011	Succeeded by Mike Kelly
Political offices
Preceded by Barry Grossman	Executive of Erie County; 2014–2022	Succeeded by Brenton Davis
U.S. order of precedence (ceremonial)
Preceded by Marjorie Margolies as Former U.S. Representative	Order of precedence of the United States as Former U.S. Representative	Succeeded by Mark Critz as Former U.S. Representative
