= Bill George (labor activist) =

American labor union activist

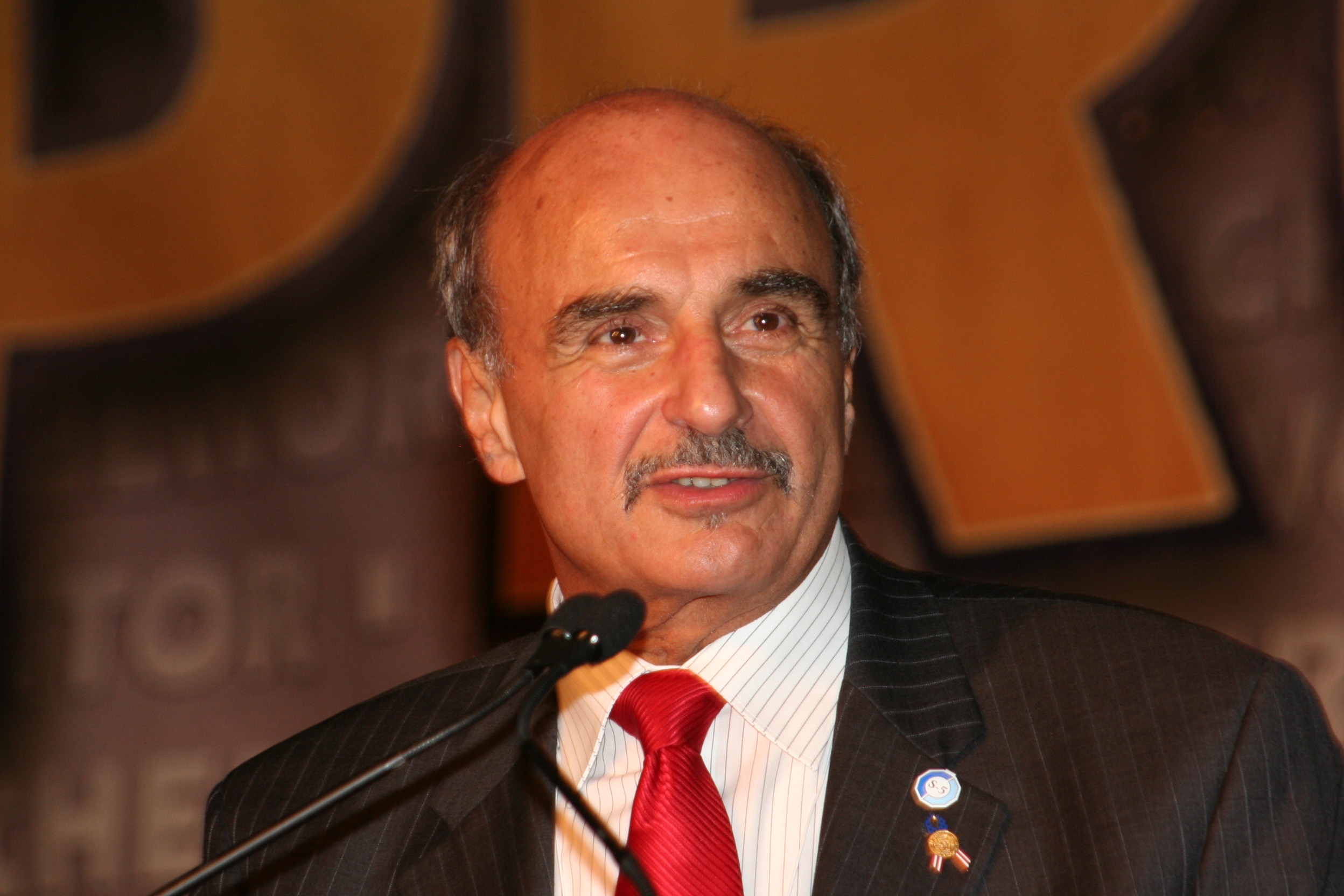

President of the Pennsylvania AFL–CIO
- In office June 1, 1990 – June 1, 2010
- Preceded by: Julius Uehlein
- Succeeded by: Rick Bloomingdale

Personal details
- Party: Democratic
- Occupation: Labor Leader, Mill Worker

William M. George is an American labor union activist and political leader who served as President of the Pennsylvania AFL–CIO from 1990 to 2010.

== Early professional career ==
George, originally a steel mill worker, began his career in union activism in 1960, when he joined the United Steelworkers of America Local 1211 in Aliquippa, Pennsylvania. In 1971, he was appointed to the International Staff of the USWA District 20. In 1985, he was elected Secretary-Treasurer of the United Steelworkers Legislative Committee of Pennsylvania, where he was in charge of the legislative and education program.

== Union leadership ==
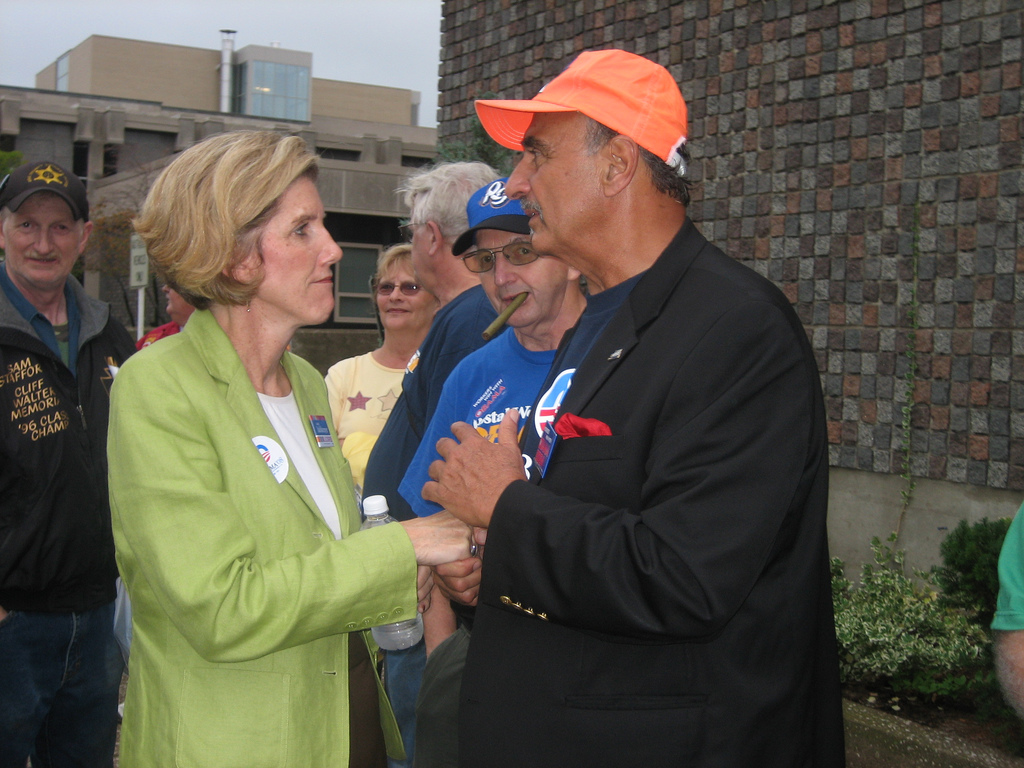
George with Congresswoman Kathy Dahlkemper in 2008.

In 1990, he was elected President of the Pennsylvania AFL–CIO. In that position, he is "unquestionably PA's top labor leader". His election was a contentious one, with hundreds of construction workers who supported George's opponent, Vice Chair Robert McIntyre, leaving the convention hall in protest prior to the vote. At issue was a recently adopted rule allowing convention delegates to carry votes for their own local unions, plus votes for local unions not present; unions had previously been limited to one vote. National president Lane Kirkland sent McIntyre a letter supporting the decision.

George served as a delegate to the 2000, 2004, and 2008 Democratic National Conventions. He served as a Presidential Elector for Pennsylvania during the 1992, 1996, and 2000 United States presidential elections. He served as member of the Democratic National Committee from 2004 through 2008.

In 2003, he was named to the PoliticsPA "Power 50" list of politically influential individuals. He was named to the PoliticsPA list of "Pennsylvania's Top Political Activists." The Pennsylvania Report named him to the 2003 "The Pennsylvania Report Power 75" list of influential figures in Pennsylvania politics, calling him "the name most people still associate with organized labor."

In 2009, the Pennsylvania Report named him to "The Pennsylvania Report 100" list of influential figures in Pennsylvania politics and noted that as a "veteran of Harrisburg political battles" Bill George was a "major force in the state Democratic Party and in the legislature." In 2010, Politics Magazine named him one of the most influential Democrats in Pennsylvania. He retired from the presidency in 2010.
