= Phil English =

American politician (born 1956)

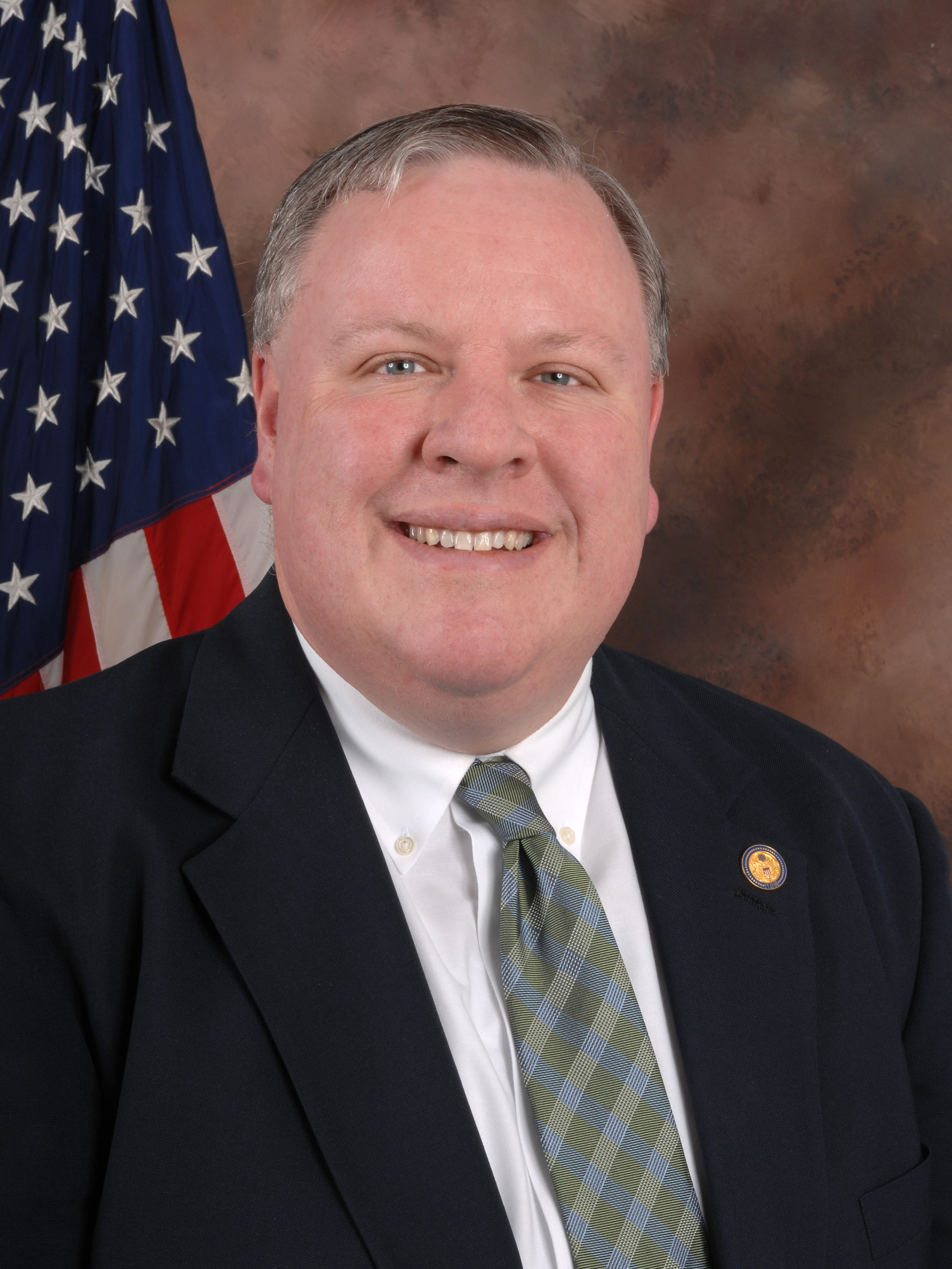
- Official house portrait

Member of the U.S. House of Representatives from Pennsylvania
- In office January 3, 1995 – January 3, 2009
- Preceded by: Tom Ridge
- Succeeded by: Kathy Dahlkemper
- Constituency: 21st district (1995–2003); 3rd district (2003–2009)

Personal details
- Born: Philip Sheridan English; June 20, 1956 (age 70) Erie, Pennsylvania, U.S.
- Party: Republican
- Spouse: Christiane English
- Education: University of Pennsylvania (BA)

Philip Sheridan English (born June 20, 1956) is an American politician who served as a Republican member of the United States House of Representatives from 1995–2009 from the Commonwealth of Pennsylvania, representing the state's 3rd congressional district.

After 14 years in the U.S. House, he was defeated for reelection by Democrat Kathy Dahlkemper on November 4, 2008.

== Early life and career ==
English is a lifelong resident of Erie and is of Irish and German descent. He attended Portsmouth Abbey School in Portsmouth, Rhode Island, and graduated from the University of Pennsylvania. While in college, he served as Chairman of the PA Federation of College Republicans.

English served as Erie City Controller from 1985 to 1989. In 1988 he was the Republican nominee for State Treasurer but was defeated by Democrat Catherine Baker Knoll. He stayed in politics and served as Chief of Staff for then State Senator Melissa Hart.

== U.S. House of Representatives ==
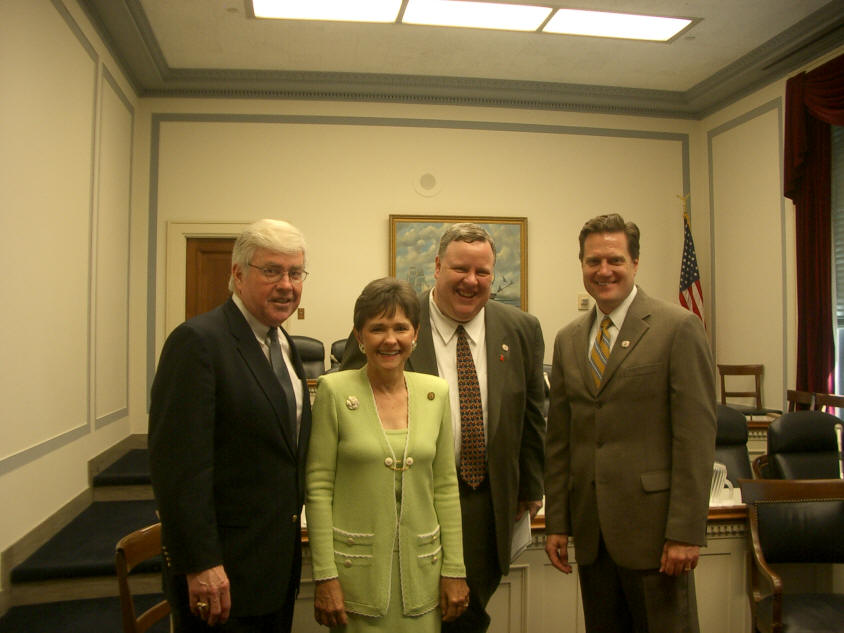
English with Jack Kemp, Sue Myrick and Mike Turner (c. May 2004)

English was elected to the House of Representatives in 1994 after seven-term incumbent Tom Ridge vacated the seat to make a successful run for governor. English benefited from the Republican wave of 1994 as well as Ridge's coattails. In addition, the Democrats had a crowded primary in which the Erie candidates split the vote, which allowed Sharon attorney Bill Leavens to win the primary. English, as a native of Erie, then garnered enough support from his hometown (generally a Democratic stronghold) to win the election.

English was re-elected in a close race in 1996 against Erie attorney and Marine Corps veteran Ron DiNicola as Bill Clinton carried the district. However, he was handily reelected in 1998 on Ridge's coattails, and didn't face a close race again until 2006. That year, he defeated Steve Porter by only 54% to 42% (with 4% going to Constitution Party candidate Tim Hagberg). Porter was an unknown retired college professor who spent virtually no money; he raised only $81,100 to English's $1.4 million.

English was liberal on economic matters and conservative on social matters. Unusually for a Republican, he had strong ties to organized labor. However, this served him well in a district that was dominated by the heavily Democratic and thoroughly unionized city of Erie (no other city in the district has more than 17,000 people).

English moved up the seniority ladder in the House over the years. From his first term, he was a member of the powerful Ways and Means Committee—the first freshman Republican to be appointed to this committee since 1975. In the 110th Congress, English served as the ranking member on the Subcommittee of Select Revenue Measures.

== 2008 election ==
English's narrow win in 2006 led the Democrats to target his seat in 2008. He faced first-time candidate and small businesswoman Kathy Dahlkemper in the November election.

The race captured considerable national attention. Although English outspent Dahlkemper—raising $2.2 million to Dahlkemper's $872,000—the Democratic House Campaign Committee overwhelmed English overall in spending on media buys and direct mail.

In the election, English was defeated, taking 48 percent of the vote to Dahlkemper's 52 percent. English carried five of the district's seven counties, but could not overcome a 14-point deficit in his native Erie County, the largest county in the district.

Party political offices
Preceded by R. Budd Dwyer	Republican nominee for Treasurer of Pennsylvania; 1988	Succeeded by Lowman Henry
U.S. House of Representatives
Preceded by Tom Ridge	Member of the U.S. House of Representatives from Pennsylvania's 21st congressional district 1995–2003	Constituency abolished
Preceded by Robert Borski	Member of the U.S. House of Representatives from Pennsylvania's 3rd congressional district 2003–2009	Succeeded by Kathy Dahlkemper
U.S. order of precedence (ceremonial)
Preceded by Donald L. Ritter as Former U.S. Representative	Order of precedence of the United States as Former U.S. Representative	Succeeded by Scott Garrett as Former U.S. Representative
