= Richard Bloomingdale =

American labor leader

Richard Wallace Bloomingdale
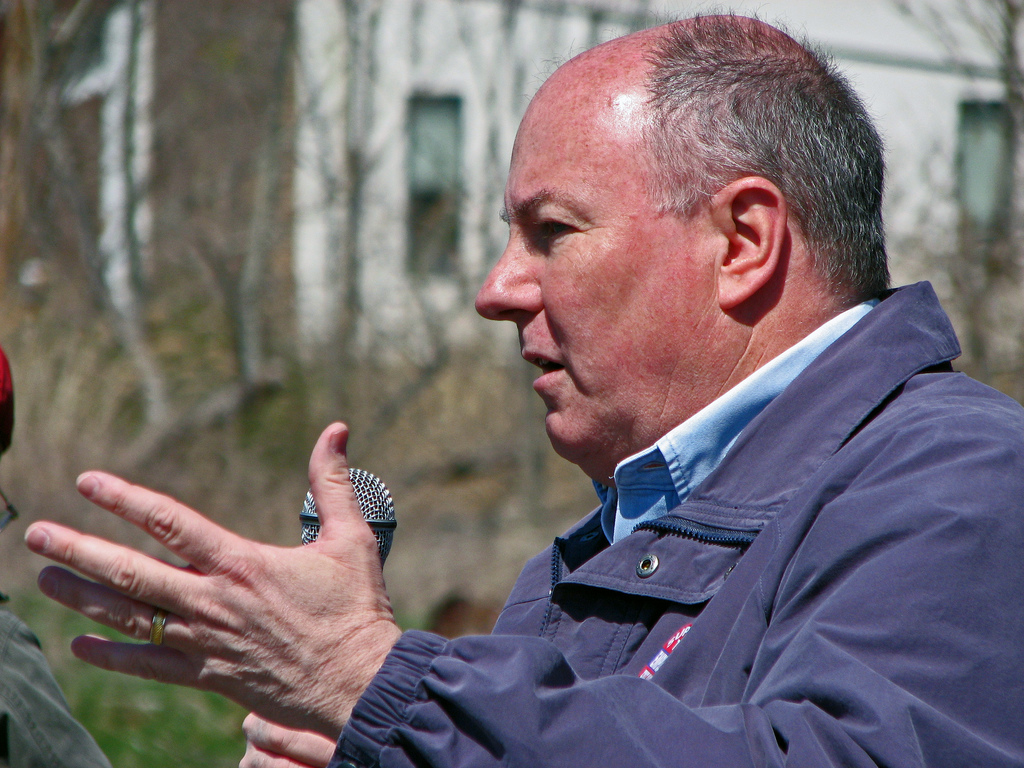
- Bloomingdale speaking at a 2009 rally in support of the Employee Free Choice Act

President of the Pennsylvania AFL–CIO
- In office June 1, 2010 – May 31, 2022
- Preceded by: Bill George
- Succeeded by: Angela Ferritto

Personal details
- Spouse: Karen
- Children: Nik and Linda
- Education: University of Arizona
- Occupation: Labor Leader

Richard Wallace "Rick" Bloomingdale is an American labor union activist who served as President of the Pennsylvania AFL–CIO from 2010 to 2022.

He began his career with the American Federation of State, County and Municipal Employees in 1977, where he worked as a Project Staff Representative of Local 449 and as Assistant Director and State Political/Legislative Director of AFSCME Council 13. In 1994, he was named Secretary-Treasurer of the Pennsylvania AFL–CIO. In 2010, he was elected President of the Pennsylvania AFL–CIO, a position he held until his retirement in 2022.

In 2002, he was named to the PoliticsPA "Sy Snyder's Power 50" list of politically influential Pennsylvanians. He was also named to the PoliticsPA list of "Pennsylvania's Top Political Activists."

He has lectured on the topic of "workforce development" at the U.S. Army War College in Carlisle, Pennsylvania. He was named to the Pennsylvania Unemployment Compensation Board of Review in 2003 and was appointed chairman in August 2005.

In 2020, Bloomingdale was elected to be a member of the Democratic National Committee.
