= Lake Erie Arboretum =

Arboretum in Erie, Pennsylvania, United States

Coordinates: 42.11850°N 80.11754°W

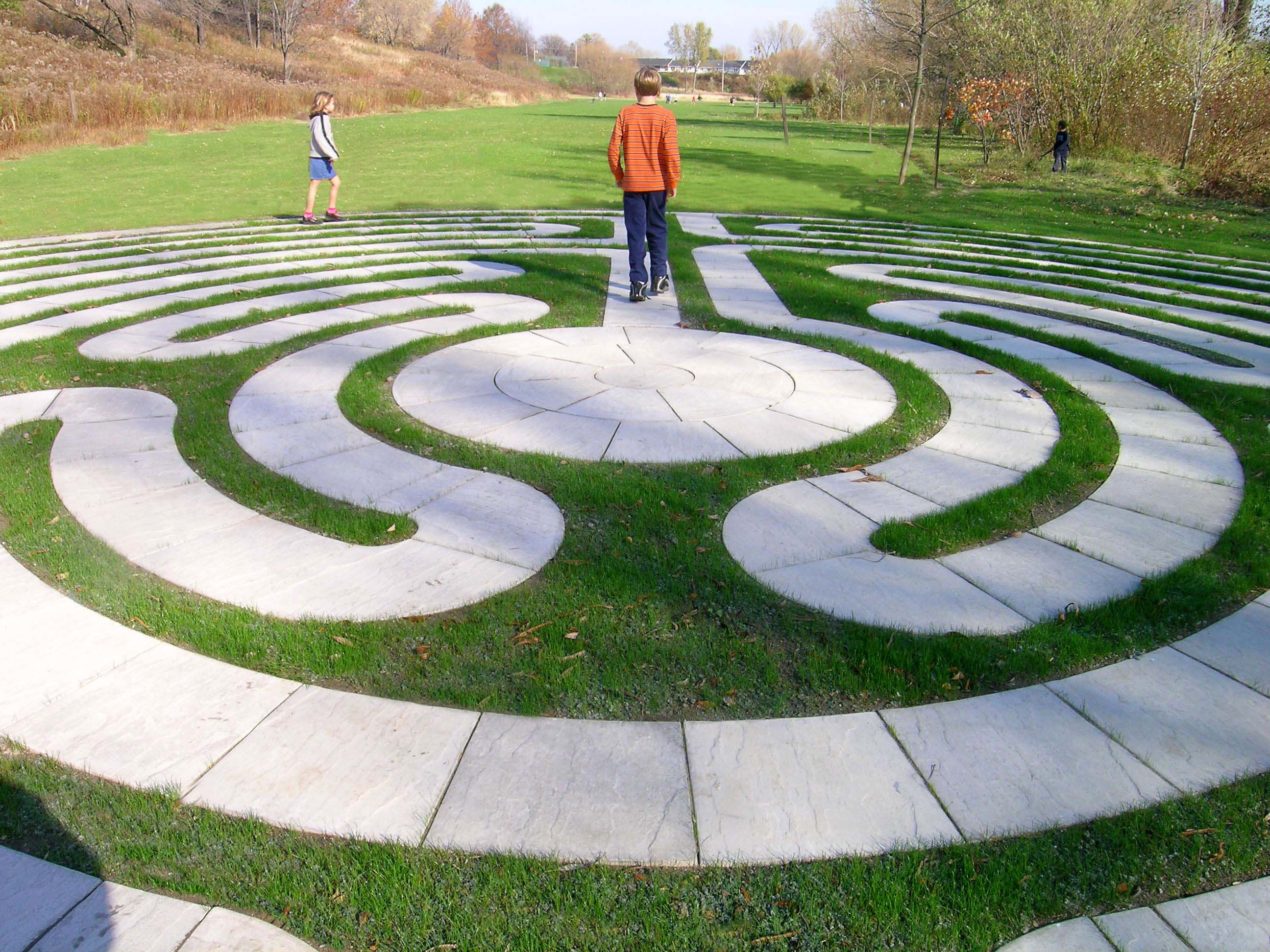
- Two young children play on the labyrinth at the Lake Erie Arboretum at Frontier Park.
- Interactive map of Lake Erie Arboretum
- Type: Arboretum
- Website: leaferie.org

Lake Erie Arboretum is a young arboretum located within Frontier Park, at the intersection of West 8th Street and Bayfront Parkway, Erie, Pennsylvania, United States. It is open to the public daily free of charge.

The arboretum was proposed in 1997 and the first tree was planted there in 1998. It now contains over 300 young trees representing some 225 tree varieties. New trees are still being added.

Some of the tree specimens represented in the arboretum include alder, catalpa, dogwood, douglas-fir, ginkgo, hawthorn, shagbark hickory, linden, honey locust, maple, scarlet oak, Russian olive, tulip-tree, black walnut, and corkscrew willow.

== See also ==
- List of botanical gardens in the United States
