= Nathan Soltz =

American politician

Chair of the Oregon Democratic Party
- Incumbent
- Assumed office March 16, 2025
- Preceded by: Rosa Colquitt

Personal details
- Born: May 10, 1997 (age 29) Medford, Oregon, U.S.
- Party: Democratic
- Education: Chemeketa Community College (attended); Western Oregon University (BA); College of William and Mary (attended)

Nathan Joseph Soltz is an American politician serving as the Chair of the Democratic Party of Oregon. Before becoming party chair, Soltz ran for Salem City Council in 2024 but lost to real estate broker Shane Matthews by 42 votes. He also worked as legislative staff for various state senators: Alan Bates in 2016, Lew Frederick in 2017-2019, and Jeff Golden in 2019. He has served as Frederick's chief of staff since 2019.

== Biography ==
Soltz is Jewish. His mother is an immigrant from El Salvador whose biological father was Japanese, and Soltz's father is of Jewish ancestry. He is LGBTQ. He has philosophy and psychology degrees from Western Oregon University, where he participated in student government and led the student senate to be the first in the state to endorse ballot measures. He founded the Oregon Democratic Jewish Caucus. In 2012, he volunteered with Oregon United for Marriage to overturn the state's ban on same-sex marriage, and he volunteered on Bates' 2014 state senate campaign. He is noted for his young age; at 19 he was Oregon's youngest-ever Democratic National Convention delegate in the 2016 Democratic National Convention and the youngest ever presidential elector in the 2020 election aged 23. He is supportive of labor unions, leading the creation of the Oregon State Legislature's first-in-the-nation staff union and attending strikes with his high school teachers.

Party political offices
Preceded by Rosa Colquitt	Chair of the Oregon Democratic Party; 2025–present	Incumbent
