= Gary LaBarbera =

American labor leader

Gary LaBarbera is an American labor leader. He served as president of the Building and Construction Trades Council of Greater New York (BCTC) since 2009 and was elected president of the New York State Building and Construction Trades Council in 2021. He is also the founder and chairman of NYC Helmets to Hardhats, a non-profit that places veterans into careers in the construction industry. In 2017, LaBarbera was appointed to the board of the Port Authority of New York and New Jersey by Governor Andrew Cuomo.

LaBarbera has also served as president of the New York City Central Labor Council, International Brotherhood of Teamsters Joint Council 16, and International Brotherhood of Teamsters Local 282.

== Early life ==
LaBarbera began his career as a forklift operator with Teamsters Local 282 on Long Island. He graduated from the Labor Studies Program at Cornell University’s School of Industrial Labor Relations in 1994.

== Career ==
In 2009, LaBarbera was elected president of the Building and Construction Trades Council of Greater New York (BCTC), a labor organization composed of local affiliates of 15 national and international unions. BCTC represents approximately 100,000 construction workers in New York City.

In 2021, LaBarbera was also elected president of the New York State Building and Construction Trades Council, which represents over 200,000 construction workers across New York.

In his capacity as president, LaBarbera negotiates project labor agreements (PLAs) with city agencies and private construction firms, notably Hudson Yards labor disputes. He has negotiated PLAs on $25 billion worth of private-sector construction work and $15 billion worth of public work.

Under his leadership, the Building Trades have become increasingly diverse. Of the 8,000 Building Trades apprentices enrolled in 2012, 75% were residents of the five boroughs and 65% were minorities.
