= Pennsylvania AFL–CIO =

U.S. federation of labor unions

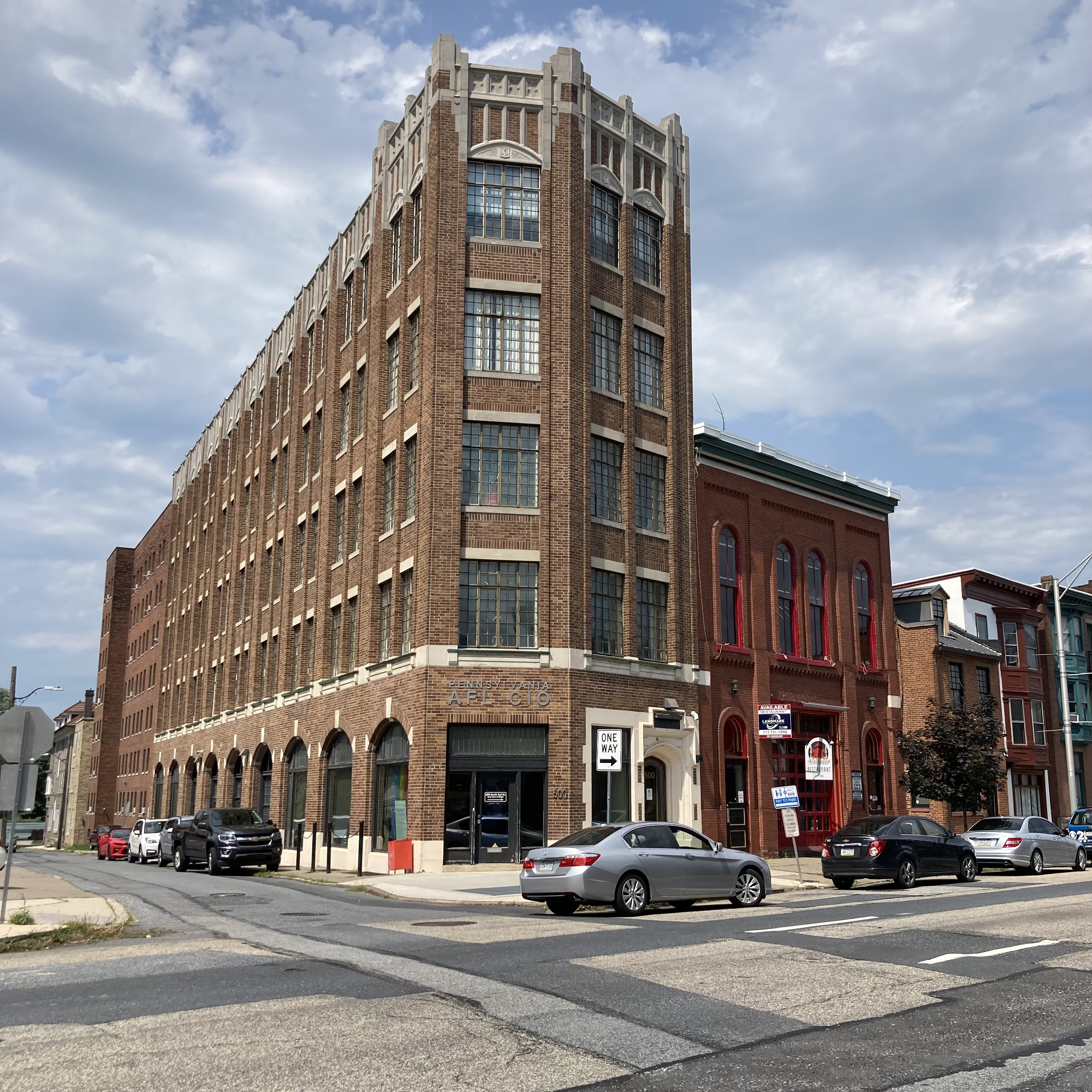
- Pennsylvania AFL–CIO headquarters in downtown Harrisburg (Pictured July 24th, 2022)
- Founded: 1960; 66 years ago
- Headquarters: Harrisburg, Pennsylvania
- Location: United States
- Members: 700,000 (2026)
- President: Angela Ferritto
- Secretary-treasurer: Maurice Cobb
- Affiliations: AFL–CIO
- Website: paaflcio.org

The Pennsylvania AFL–CIO is a federation of labor unions in the U.S. state of Pennsylvania in the United States. It is an affiliate of the AFL–CIO. It was formed on June 9, 1960, by the merger of two predecessor bodies, the Pennsylvania Federation of Labor (an affiliate of the American Federation of Labor) and the Pennsylvania Industrial Union Council (an affiliate of the Congress of Industrial Organizations). It can trace its history through its predecessor bodies to 1890.

== The first Pennsylvania Federation of Labor ==
The first Pennsylvania Federation of Labor was organized in 1890 in Harrisburg, Pennsylvania. I. W. Bisbing, president of a Cigar Makers' Union in Philadelphia, was elected president and the organization affiliated with the American Federation of Labor (AFL). The federation's second convention was held in Lancaster, Pennsylvania, August 17–19, 1891. Charles A. Miller, a printers' union member from Harrisburg, was elected president. At this time, the federation had 35 local unions as members. Three vice presidents and a secretary-treasurer were also elected at this convention. The federation's third convention was held in Chester, Pennsylvania, August 15–17, 1892. Elmer E. Greenawalt, a Cigar Makers' Union member from Lancaster, was elected president. The number of local unions which were member had dropped to 28, although six central labor councils had joined as members. The Chester convention also advocated independent political action by the state federation, rather than allegiance to a single party.

The state federation did not survive, however. The steel and coal mining industries dominated Pennsylvania's economy, but union membership in both was low and strikebreaking was common in all industries. In 1894, the Pennsylvania Federation of Labor dissolved.

== The second Pennsylvania Federation of Labor, 1901–present ==
By 1900, unions in Pennsylvania were once more growing. Early 1901, the Lancaster Central Labor Council issued a call to form a new state federation of labor under the auspices of the national AFL. The AFL held its convention in Scranton, Pennsylvania, in November 1901, at which time the Pennsylvania delegates formed a temporary organization to re-issue the call for a new state federation. The group held a founding convention on March 10, 1902, in Wilkes-Barre, Pennsylvania, and the second Pennsylvania Federation of Labor was organized. Hugh Frayne was elected its first president. Elmer E. Greenawalt as elected Frayne's successor in 1903.

In 1912, Greenawalt retired as president of the United States, and James H. Maurer was elected his successor.

=== President Maurer's tenure, 1912–1928 ===
James Maurer was one of the most prominent trade union activists in the country, and a lifelong socialist. In 1899, at the age of 35, he joined the Socialist Labor Party, and in 1906 ran for Governor of Pennsylvania on the Socialist Party ticket garnering nearly 26,000 votes. In November 1910, he had been elected as a Socialist to the Pennsylvania House of Representatives, but was defeated for re-election in 1912. He ran again and won in both 1914 and 1916.

He was very active in the steel strike of 1919. He was elected president of the Workers' Education Bureau of America and Brookwood Labor College in 1921, and won a seat on the governing National Committee of the Conference for Progressive Political Action in 1922. In November 1927, Maurer was elected to the city council of Reading, Pennsylvania. He declined to run for reelection as PFL president in 1928, so that he could run for Vice President of the United States with Norman Thomas on the Socialist Party's presidential ticket.

During his tenure as president of the PFL, Maurer was an increasingly vocal advocate of industrial unionism, which beginning in the 1920s, had become a major issue in the American labor movement after for most of the previous century, American unions had embraced craft unionism, in which only the most highly skilled workers are unionized into unions which had very narrow jurisdictions. The vast majority of workers were left unorganized. But as assembly line manufacturing began to displace skilled labor as the primary method of manufacturing, semi-skilled and unskilled workers began to vastly outnumber skilled workers. Working conditions in mass manufacturing were significantly worse than those in skilled manufacturing, and company towns became common. Industrial unionism appealed to many in the American labor movement, because it not only allowed millions of new workers to enter trade unions, it also empowered the labor movement politically so that social ills such as unsafe working conditions, long working hours, low wages and excessive profit-taking, lack of unemployment insurance, lack of pensions, and child labor) could be combated.

A battle broke for the presidency of the PFL when Maurer retired. Leading a faction in favor of craft unionism was John S. Otis, a machinist from Pittsburgh. John J. Casey represented the emerging industrial union wing of the federation. Casey was a member of the United States House of Representatives, first from Pennsylvania's 11th congressional district from 1913 to 1917 and again from 1919 to 1921, and then from Pennsylvania's 12th congressional district from 1923 to 1925. He was reelected to Congress in 1926. A former union organizer for the United Mine Workers, Casey was the best-known labor union member in the state of Pennsylvania and its foremost advocate. Also representing the industrial union wing as James A. Phillips, a cigarmaker from Philadelphia. But whereas Otis argued for expelling industrial union advocates from the labor federation, Phillips argued for adopting industrial unionism wholesale. Casey, meanwhile, was a compromise candidate who advocated both philosophies toward labor organizing (although he favored industrial unionism). Casey easily defeated Otis and Phillips by a wide margin.

Casey suffered from high blood pressure and died of a massive stroke on May 5, 1929. Secretary-Treasurer James E. Kelley was named Acting President until new elections were held.

At the PFL's convention in May 1930, James A. Phillips was elected Casey's successor.

=== PFL split, 1938 ===
The Great Depression led to the election of Franklin D. Roosevelt as president, and on June 16, 1933, President Roosevelt signed the National Industrial Recovery Act into law to help combat the effects of the economic crisis. Title I, Section 7(a) guaranteed the right of workers to form unions and banned yellow-dog contracts. These protections led to a massive wave of union organizing punctuated by employer and union violence, general strikes, and recognition strikes.

The leadership of the Pennsylvania Federation of Labor largely embraced industrial unionism. American Federal of Labor President William Green ordered the PFL to expel any central labor council, union, or member who refused to denounce industrial unionism and the CIO. PFL president John A. Phillips refused to do so. On February 23, 1938, Green withdrew the charter of the Pennsylvania Federation of Labor.

On February 25, 1938, President Phillips led the PFL Executive Council calling for a federation of industrial unions, claiming to represent 400,000 union members in Pennsylvania. Philips said the new industrial federation would organize itself at the end of March 1938 in Harrisburg. Philips and the other PFL officers in the PFL Executive Council retained possession of the old state federation's property and assets and appointed themselves temporary officers of the new CIO state body. On March 29, 1938, Pennsylvania unions in favor of industrial organizing formed the Pennsylvania Industrial Union Council.

On April 6, 1938 a new AFL-affiliated federation of labor was organized at a convention held in the state capital, Harrisburg. Lewis G. Hines, Green's personal representative, convened the meeting. On April 9, 1938, at the conclusion of the three-day convention, James L. McDevitt defeated James "Happy" Wright in a hard-fought election, 946 to 748. The PFL had just under 300,000 members, slightly less than half the total membership of the predecessor body.

Because the Pennsylvania Industrial Union Council held title to the federation's headquarters in Harrisburg, the reconstituted PFL had to go to court to regain possession and it regained its building in May 1938.

=== PFL and Pennsylvania Industrial Union Council merged, 1960–present ===
The two state groups in Pennsylvania would not merge until 1960, five years after the AFL and the CIO had merged in 1955. Negotiations on a merger had begun soon after the national bodies merged, but it took the personal intervention of AFL–CIO President George Meany to effect a merger in Pennsylvania leaving only one state, New Jersey, remained unmerged.

In an odd turn of events, Joseph McDonough resigned as president of the Pennsylvania AFL on June 7, 1960, to protest the election of Earl C. Bohr as the state federation's secretary-treasurer. McDonough backed Mullin, and the Philadelphia caucus, which represented a majority of votes at the convention, initially recommended Mullin for the post. Bohr supporters successfully challenged this motion on the floor, arguing a recommendation was out of order. Both men were nominated, but Bohr beat Mullin, 1,074 to 754. McDonough, who was in line to be co-president of the merged AFL–CIO, immediately quit. Joseph F. Burke became president of the Pennsylvania AFL for the next two days.

In 1960, the Pennsylvania AFL–CIO had 1 million members. Its first presidents were Joseph F. Burke, an AFL building trades union leader from Philadelphia and Harry Boyer, a CIO steelworkers union leader from Reading, Pennsylvania). The co-presidency lasted just two years, after which Boyer became the sole president. He remained president from 1962 until 1982, and was 78 at the time of his retirement

By 2011, the state federation represented 900,000 workers, dropping to just 800,000 in 2012.

== Political Campaigns ==
In 2014, the Pennsylvania AFL–CIO endorsed Democratic gubernatorial candidate Tom Wolf and his running mate for lieutenant governor, Mike Stack.

== Leadership ==
=== Presidents of the Pennsylvania AFL (1890–1894) ===
- I. W. Bisbing, 1890–1891
- Charles A. Miller, 1891–1892
- Elmer Ellsworth Greenawalt, 1892–1894

=== Presidents of the Pennsylvania AFL (1902–1960) ===
- Hugh Frayne, 1902–1903
- Elmer Ellsworth Greenawalt, 1903–1912
- James H. Maurer, 1912–1928
- John J. Casey, 1928–1929
- James E. Kelley, 1929–1930 (acting president)
- John A. Phillips, 1930–1938
- James L. McDevitt, 1938–1956
- Joseph McDonough, 1954–1960
- Joseph F. Burke, 1960

=== Presidents of the CIO Pennsylvania Industrial Union Council (1938–1960) ===
- John A. Phillips, 1938 (acting)
- John A. Phillips, 1938–1944
- Harry Boyer, 1945–1960

=== Presidents of the Pennsylvania AFL–CIO ===
- Joseph F. Burke and Harry Boyer (co-presidents), 1960–1962
- Harry Boyer, 1962–1982
- Julius Uehlein, 1982–1990
- William M. George, 1990–2010
- Richard Bloomingdale, 2010–2022
- Angela Ferritto, 2022–present

== Bibliography ==
- Bernstein, Irving. The Turbulent Years: A History of the American Worker, 1933–1941. Paperback edition. Boston: Houghton-Mifflin Co., 1970.
- Busky, Donald F. Democratic Socialism: A Global Survey. Westport, Conn.: Praeger, 2000.
- Dubofsky, Melvyn and Dulles, Foster Rhea. Labor in America: A History. 6th ed. Wheeling, Ill.: Harlan Davidson, Inc., 1999.
- International Union of Electrical, Radio and Machine Workers. Proceedings of the Eighteenth Constitutional Convention of the International Union of Electrical, Radio and Machine Workers, AFL–CIO. Washington, D.C.: IUE, 1978
- Maurer, James Hudson. "It Can Be Done - The Autobiography of James Hudson Maurer" Rand School Press, 1938.
- Pennsylvania Federation of Labor. Pennsylvania Federation of Labor Year Book, 1952. Harrisburg, Pa.: Pennsylvania Federation of Labor, 1952.
- Pennsylvania Federation of Labor. Pennsylvania Federation of Labor Official Year Book, 1910. Harrisburg, Pa.: Pennsylvania Federation of Labor, 1910.
- Pennsylvania Industrial Union Council. Eighth Annual Yearbook and Reports of Officers. Harrisburg, Pa.: Congress of Industrial Organizations, 1945.
- Pennsylvania State Committee. Pennsylvania Almanac and Buyers' Guide. Harrisburg, Pa.: The Pennsylvania Almanac and Buyers' Guide Co., 1961.
- Rayback, Joseph G. A History of American Labor. Rev. and exp. ed. New York: MacMillan Publishing Co., 1974.
- Spear, Sheldon. Wyoming Valley History Revisited: With a Few Glimpses Beyond: From Utopian Visions to Post-Anthracite Realities. Shavertown, Pa.: Jemags & Company, 1994.
- Stern, Andy. A Country That Works: Getting America Back on Track. New York: Simon and Schuster, 2008.
