= Anastasia Somoza =

American disability rights advocate

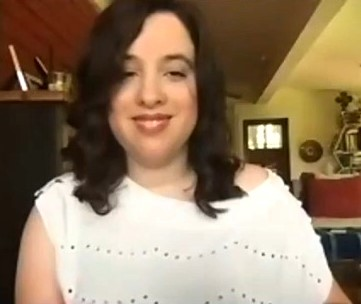
- Somoza in 2020
- Born: 1983 or 1984 (age 42–43); New York City, New York, U.S.
- Education: Georgetown University (BA); London School of Economics (MS)
- Occupation: Disability rights advocate
- Years active: 1993–present
- Political party: Democratic
- Relatives: Luis Somoza Debayle (grandfather); Anastasio Somoza García (great grandfather)
- Family: Somoza

Anastasia Somoza (born 1983 or 1984) is an American disability rights advocate and a descendant of the Somoza ruling family of Nicaragua. Born with cerebral palsy and spastic quadriplegia, she became involved in advocacy in a 1993 televised townhall with United States president Bill Clinton where as a nine-year-old she asked that her twin sister, who is also disabled, be allowed to join her in a mainstream classroom. Somoza spoke at the 2016 Democratic National Convention and in 2018 was appointed the first liaison to the disability community for the New York City Council. In 2024, she was the disability engagement director for Kamala Harris's presidential campaign.

== Early life and family ==
Somoza has an identical twin sister, Alba; both were born with cerebral palsy and spastic quadriplegia. She also has an older brother and younger sister, and was born and grew up in Manhattan where her mother Mary, an immigrant from Ireland, was an advisor to mayor David Dinkins and governor Mario Cuomo on disabled children. Her father Gerardo immigrated from Nicaragua with his mother when he was 12; he is the son and grandson, respectively, of Nicaraguan presidents Luis Somoza Debayle and Anastasio Somoza García.

Somoza began her disability rights advocacy at nine years old, appearing on a 1993 televised townhall with president Bill Clinton where she asked that her twin, who cannot speak and uses a computer to communicate, be allowed in a mainstream classroom as she was. Clinton intervened, together with the efforts of the Somoza parents, and Alba was allowed to join the general education classroom.

Somoza graduated from Georgetown University in 2007, majoring in government and minoring in English, then attended the London School of Economics where she earned a master's of science in human rights.

== Career ==
Somoza interned for Hillary Clinton in the United States Senate and worked on her 2000 Senate campaign. Somoza spoke at the Democratic National Convention in 2016, emphasizing the agency of disabled people and criticizing Donald Trump, who had ridiculed a disabled reporter the previous year. She received a standing ovation and her speech later appeared in a Clinton campaign ad, contrasting her comments with Trump's attack. Somoza was then working for the disability organization the Shield Institute, and served as a campaign surrogate for the 2016 Hillary Clinton presidential campaign. In 2018, she was appointed by New York City Council Speaker Corey Johnson to be the first liaison to the disability community for the council.

In 2024, she was the disability engagement director for the Kamala Harris presidential campaign.

== Personal life ==
Somoza became friends with comedian Amy Poehler after Poehler responded to a letter from the Somoza family and apologized for a 2008 Saturday Night Live sketch in which she mocked Somoza and her twin sister.
