= 2008 United States presidential election in Virginia =

- November 4, 2008
- Turnout: 74.0% ▲3.2

| Nominee | Barack Obama | John McCain |
| Party | Democratic | Republican |
| Home state | Illinois | Arizona |
| Running mate | Joe Biden | Sarah Palin |
| Electoral vote | 13 | 0 |
| Popular vote | 1,959,532 | 1,725,005 |
| Percentage | 52.63% | 46.33% |

Obama
40–50%
50–60%
60–70%
70–80%
80–90%
90–100%
McCain
40–50%
50–60%
60–70%
70–80%
80–90%
Tie/No Data
President before election
George W. Bush
Republican
Elected President
Barack Obama
Democratic

The 2008 United States presidential election in Virginia took place on November 4, 2008, which was part of the 2008 United States presidential election. Voters chose 13 representatives, or electors to the Electoral College, who voted for president and vice president.

Virginia was won by Democratic nominee Barack Obama by a 6.3% margin of victory. Prior to the election, 16 of 17 news organizations considered this a state Obama would win, or otherwise a likely blue state, despite the fact that Virginia had not voted for a Democratic presidential nominee since Lyndon B. Johnson's 44-state landslide in 1964. The 2008 financial crisis, changing demographics, and population increases in voter-rich Northern Virginia helped make the state more competitive for Obama. His victory marked a powerful shift in the political climate in Virginia, as the state would go on to vote for the Democratic presidential nominee in every election thereafter.

In contrast to Virginia, West Virginia voted for McCain. This was the first time Virginia voted Democratic and West Virginia voted Republican since 1924. Starting in 2008, Virginia has always voted for the Democratic nominee and West Virginia has always voted for the Republican nominee.

Despite Obama's victory, Virginia's margin was 0.97% more Republican than the national average, the most recent time Virginia has voted further to the right than the nation at-large, although it was the closest to the national results. As of the 2024 presidential election, this is the last election in which King and Queen County voted for the Democratic candidate.

== Primaries ==
- 2008 Virginia Democratic presidential primary
- 2008 Virginia Republican presidential primary

== Campaign ==
Virginia was one of the first Southern states to break away from its traditional Democratic roots. It voted for Dwight Eisenhower by a convincing margin in 1952, and voted for every Republican nominee since then save for Johnson's massive landslide in 1964.

However, the Democrats had made big gains in recent years by winning two gubernatorial races in a row, regaining control of the Virginia Senate, and electing Democrat Jim Webb to the U.S. Senate over incumbent Republican George Allen in 2006. Democrats made such gains in part due to the ever-expanding Northern Virginia, particularly the suburbs surrounding Washington, D.C. Historically, this area was strongly Republican. However, in recent years it has been dominated by white liberals who tend to vote Democratic. It was, ultimately, this rapid demographic change that provided a huge new influx of Democratic voters to Virginia.

Both presidential campaigns and the mainstream media treated Virginia as a swing state for most of the campaign. Obama campaigned extensively in Virginia and counted on the booming northern parts of the state for a Democratic victory. Victory in the presidential election for McCain would have been extremely difficult without Virginia; he would have had to win every swing state as well as at least one Democratic-leaning state.

=== Predictions ===
There were 16 news organizations that made state-by-state predictions of the election. Here are their last predictions before election day:

| Source | Ranking |
|---|---|
| D.C. Political Report | Lean D (flip) |
| Cook Political Report | Lean D (flip) |
| The Takeaway | Lean D (flip) |
| Electoral-vote.com | Lean D (flip) |
| Washington Post | Lean D (flip) |
| Politico | Lean D (flip) |
| RealClearPolitics | Toss-up |
| FiveThirtyEight | Lean D (flip) |
| CQ Politics | Lean D (flip) |
| The New York Times | Lean D (flip) |
| CNN | Lean D (flip) |
| NPR | Lean D (flip) |
| MSNBC | Lean D (flip) |
| Fox News | Likely D (flip) |
| Associated Press | Likely D (flip) |
| Rasmussen Reports | Lean D (flip) |

=== Polling ===
After McCain clinched the Republican Party nomination in early March, he took a wide lead in polls against Obama, averaging almost 50%. But through the summer, polling was nearly dead even, with McCain only slightly leading Obama. After the Lehman Brothers went bankrupt, Obama took a wide lead in the polls. In October, Obama won every single poll taken but one, and reached over 50% in most of them. The final three polls averaged Obama leading 51% to 46%.

=== Fundraising ===
Obama raised $17,035,784. McCain raised $16,130,194.

=== Spending and visits ===
Obama spent over $26 million to McCain spending just $14 million. The Obama-Biden ticket visited the state 19 times compared to just 10 times for McCain-Palin.

== Analysis ==
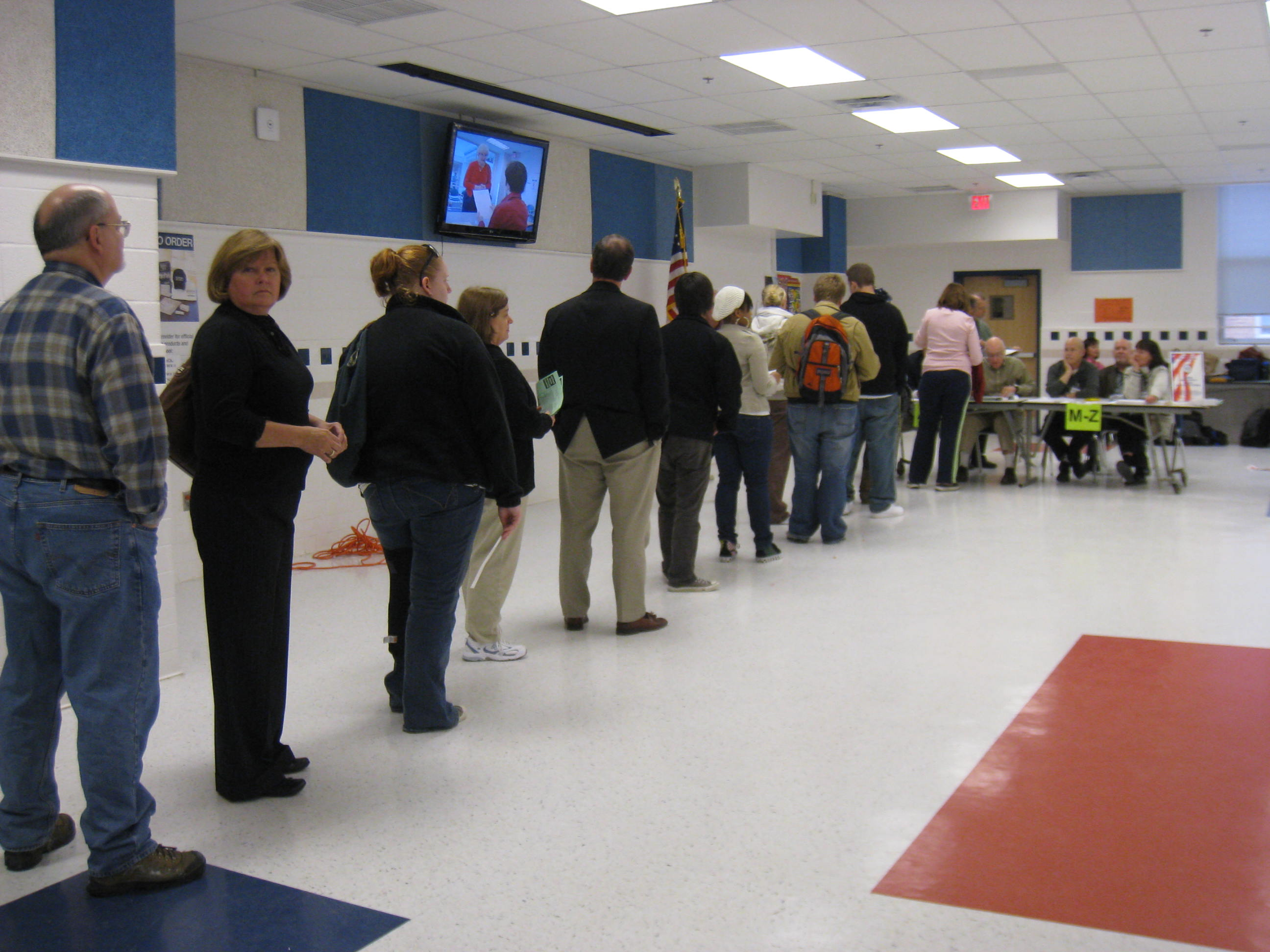
Voters wait in queue at a polling station on the campus of George Mason University

On Election Day, early returns showed McCain ahead. This was due in large part to the fact that many of the rural areas began to report first. However, Obama swamped McCain by scoring a near-sweep in Northern Virginia, which reported its returns last.

Obama did exceptionally well throughout the most populous regions of the state. Northern Virginia overwhelmingly supported Obama. In Arlington County and the independent city of Alexandria, the most traditionally Democratic jurisdictions in the region, Obama got over 70% of the vote, improving on Kerry by between 4% and 5% in both. In Fairfax County (the largest county in the state, and a then-traditionally Republican county that Kerry had become the first Democrat in 40 years to carry in 2004) Obama exceeded 60%, improving on Kerry's percentage by just shy of 7%. Just beyond Fairfax, to its south and west, Obama flipped the large counties of Loudoun and Prince William, becoming the first Democrat to carry either since 1964. He also won the independent cities of Harrisonburg for the first time since 1940, Hopewell since 1952, Manassas Park since 1976, Staunton since 1944, and Winchester since 1964.

The two other major metropolitan areas in the eastern part of the state, Richmond and Hampton Roads, are somewhat less Democratic than Northern Virginia. In both areas, Obama improved significantly on John Kerry's performance. While Obama easily won Richmond itself (which is 57% African American), he also made significant inroads into Richmond's traditionally heavily Republican suburbs. He carried Henrico County with 57% of the vote; that county last supported a Democrat with Harry S. Truman in 1948. In Chesterfield County, Obama did almost 20 points better than Kerry. Both counties had historically been strongly Republican at the national level; Chesterfield had given George W. Bush his largest raw vote margin in Virginia in both 2000 and 2004.

Obama also did very well in Hampton Roads. The four Democratic-leaning cities along the harbor - Hampton, Newport News, Norfolk, and Portsmouth - gave him margins exceeding 60%. Obama also split the Republican-leaning cities of Chesapeake and Virginia Beach; he barely won the former and barely lost the latter. Obama's strong performance in the area likely contributed to Democrat Glenn Nye unseating two-term Republican incumbent Thelma Drake in the 2nd Congressional District, a heavy military district which includes all of Virginia Beach and large portions of Norfolk and Hampton. Outside Virginia's three major metropolitan areas, Obama also significantly outperformed Kerry in Albemarle and Montgomery Counties and in a series of independent cities around the state, most significantly Roanoke. Albemarle County surrounds Charlottesville, home to the University of Virginia, and Montgomery County is home to Virginia Tech.

Elsewhere in rural Virginia, however, McCain did well. In the Shenandoah Valley and Southside Virginia, both traditional bases for the Republican Party in Virginia, Obama ran roughly evenly with Kerry. This area was among the first areas of Virginia to break away from "Solid South" Democratic patterns; the old-line Byrd Democrats had started splitting their tickets as early as the 1930s However, in southwestern Virginia—at the time one of the more traditionally Democratic regions of the state—McCain outperformed Bush in 2004, even flippingBuchanan and Dickenson counties, both of which last voted Republican in 1972; Obama thus became the first Democrat to win the White House without carrying the aforementioned two counties since Woodrow Wilson in 1916. However, without the support of suburban voters in the eastern metropolitan areas of the commonwealth, McCain was ultimately unable to hold Virginia.

During the same election, former Democratic Governor Mark Warner solidly defeated former Governor (and his predecessor) Republican Jim Gilmore by a two-to-one margin for the open U.S. Senate seat vacated by incumbent Republican John Warner (no relation to Mark Warner). Warner received 65.03% of the vote while Gilmore took in 33.73%. Warner won all but five counties in the state. Democrats also picked up three seats in the U.S. House of Representatives. At the state level, Democrats picked up one seat in the Virginia House of Delegates.

== Results ==
United States presidential election in Virginia, 2008
| Party | Candidate | Running mate | Votes | Percentage | Electoral votes |
|---|---|---|---|---|---|
| Democratic | Barack Obama | Joe Biden | 1,959,532 | 52.63% | 13 |
| Republican | John McCain | Sarah Palin | 1,725,005 | 46.33% | 0 |
| Independent | Ralph Nader | Matt Gonzalez | 11,483 | 0.31% | 0 |
| Libertarian | Bob Barr | Wayne Allyn Root | 11,067 | 0.30% | 0 |
| Constitution | Chuck Baldwin | Darrell Castle | 7,474 | 0.20% | 0 |
| Green | Cynthia McKinney | Rosa Clemente | 2,344 | 0.06% | 0 |
| Write-ins | Write-ins | | 6,355 | 0.17% | 0 |
| Totals | | | 3,723,260 | 100.00% | 13 |
| Voter turnout (Voting age population) | | | | | 65.1% |

=== By city and county ===
| County/city | Barack Obama Democratic | | John McCain Republican | | Other candidates Various parties | | Margin | | Total |
| County/city | # | % | # | % | # | % | # | % | Total |
|---|---|---|---|---|---|---|---|---|---|
| Accomack | 7,607 | 48.69% | 7,833 | 50.14% | 183 | 1.17% | -226 | -1.45% | 15,623 |
| Albemarle | 29,792 | 58.43% | 20,576 | 40.36% | 616 | 1.21% | 9,216 | 18.07% | 50,984 |
| Alexandria | 50,473 | 71.73% | 19,181 | 27.26% | 710 | 1.01% | 31,292 | 44.47% | 70,364 |
| Alleghany | 3,553 | 48.22% | 3,715 | 50.41% | 101 | 1.37% | -162 | -2.19% | 7,369 |
| Amelia | 2,488 | 38.11% | 3,970 | 60.81% | 71 | 1.08% | -1,482 | -22.70% | 6,529 |
| Amherst | 6,094 | 41.46% | 8,470 | 57.62% | 136 | 0.92% | -2,376 | -16.16% | 14,700 |
| Appomattox | 2,641 | 34.61% | 4,903 | 64.26% | 86 | 1.13% | -2,262 | -29.65% | 7,630 |
| Arlington | 78,994 | 71.71% | 29,876 | 27.12% | 1,283 | 1.17% | 49,118 | 44.59% | 110,153 |
| Augusta | 9,825 | 29.47% | 23,120 | 69.35% | 393 | 1.18% | -13,295 | -39.88% | 33,338 |
| Bath | 1,043 | 42.89% | 1,349 | 55.47% | 40 | 1.64% | -306 | -12.58% | 2,432 |
| Bedford | 11,017 | 30.75% | 24,420 | 68.16% | 393 | 1.09% | -13,403 | -37.41% | 35,830 |
| Bedford City | 1,208 | 44.18% | 1,497 | 54.75% | 29 | 1.07% | -289 | -10.57% | 2,734 |
| Bland | 864 | 29.20% | 2,031 | 68.64% | 64 | 2.16% | -1,167 | -39.44% | 2,959 |
| Botetourt | 5,693 | 32.71% | 11,471 | 65.90% | 242 | 1.39% | -5,778 | -33.19% | 17,406 |
| Bristol | 2,665 | 36.21% | 4,579 | 62.22% | 115 | 1.57% | -1,914 | -26.01% | 7,359 |
| Brunswick | 4,973 | 62.84% | 2,877 | 36.35% | 64 | 0.81% | 2,096 | 26.49% | 7,914 |
| Buchanan | 4,063 | 46.52% | 4,541 | 51.99% | 130 | 1.49% | -478 | -5.47% | 8,734 |
| Buckingham | 3,489 | 49.89% | 3,428 | 49.01% | 77 | 1.10% | 61 | 0.88% | 6,994 |
| Buena Vista | 1,108 | 45.73% | 1,282 | 52.91% | 33 | 1.36% | -174 | -7.18% | 2,423 |
| Campbell | 8,091 | 31.34% | 17,444 | 67.58% | 279 | 1.08% | -9,353 | -36.24% | 25,814 |
| Caroline | 7,163 | 55.45% | 5,617 | 43.48% | 139 | 1.07% | 1,546 | 11.97% | 12,919 |
| Carroll | 4,109 | 32.67% | 8,187 | 65.08% | 283 | 2.25% | -4,078 | -32.41% | 12,579 |
| Charles City | 2,838 | 68.34% | 1,288 | 31.01% | 27 | 0.65% | 1,550 | 37.33% | 4,153 |
| Charlotte | 2,705 | 43.93% | 3,372 | 54.77% | 80 | 1.30% | -667 | -10.84% | 6,157 |
| Charlottesville | 15,705 | 78.35% | 4,078 | 20.35% | 261 | 1.30% | 11,627 | 58.00% | 20,044 |
| Chesapeake | 53,994 | 50.22% | 52,625 | 48.94% | 902 | 0.84% | 1,369 | 1.28% | 107,521 |
| Chesterfield | 74,310 | 45.85% | 86,413 | 53.31% | 1,365 | 0.84% | -12,103 | -7.46% | 162,088 |
| Clarke | 3,457 | 46.52% | 3,840 | 51.68% | 134 | 1.80% | -383 | -5.16% | 7,431 |
| Colonial Heights | 2,562 | 28.95% | 6,161 | 69.62% | 126 | 1.43% | -3,599 | -40.67% | 8,849 |
| Covington | 1,304 | 55.40% | 1,020 | 43.33% | 30 | 1.27% | 284 | 12.07% | 2,354 |
| Craig | 877 | 33.46% | 1,695 | 64.67% | 49 | 1.87% | -818 | -31.21% | 2,621 |
| Culpeper | 8,802 | 44.59% | 10,711 | 54.26% | 228 | 1.15% | -1,909 | -9.67% | 19,741 |
| Cumberland | 2,255 | 47.73% | 2,418 | 51.19% | 51 | 1.08% | -163 | -3.46% | 4,724 |
| Danville | 12,352 | 59.13% | 8,361 | 40.02% | 177 | 0.85% | 3,991 | 19.11% | 20,890 |
| Dickenson | 3,278 | 48.54% | 3,324 | 49.22% | 151 | 2.24% | -46 | -0.68% | 6,753 |
| Dinwiddie | 6,246 | 48.45% | 6,526 | 50.62% | 120 | 0.93% | -280 | -2.17% | 12,892 |
| Emporia | 1,702 | 65.04% | 897 | 34.28% | 18 | 0.68% | 805 | 30.76% | 2,617 |
| Essex | 2,934 | 54.70% | 2,379 | 44.35% | 51 | 0.95% | 555 | 10.35% | 5,364 |
| Fairfax | 310,359 | 60.12% | 200,994 | 38.93% | 4,901 | 0.95% | 109,365 | 21.19% | 516,254 |
| Fairfax City | 6,575 | 57.69% | 4,691 | 41.16% | 132 | 1.15% | 1,884 | 16.53% | 11,398 |
| Falls Church | 4,695 | 69.56% | 1,970 | 29.19% | 85 | 1.25% | 2,725 | 40.37% | 6,750 |
| Fauquier | 14,616 | 42.71% | 19,227 | 56.19% | 376 | 1.10% | -4,611 | -13.48% | 34,219 |
| Floyd | 2,937 | 39.08% | 4,441 | 59.09% | 138 | 1.83% | -1,504 | -20.01% | 7,516 |
| Fluvanna | 6,185 | 48.57% | 6,420 | 50.41% | 130 | 1.02% | -235 | -1.84% | 12,735 |
| Franklin | 9,618 | 37.86% | 15,414 | 60.68% | 369 | 1.46% | -5,796 | -22.82% | 25,401 |
| Franklin City | 2,819 | 63.68% | 1,576 | 35.60% | 32 | 0.72% | 1,243 | 28.08% | 4,427 |
| Frederick | 12,961 | 38.56% | 20,149 | 59.95% | 502 | 1.49% | -7,188 | -21.39% | 33,612 |
| Fredericksburg | 6,155 | 63.60% | 3,413 | 35.27% | 109 | 1.13% | 2,742 | 28.33% | 9,677 |
| Galax | 1,052 | 43.80% | 1,317 | 54.83% | 33 | 1.37% | -265 | -11.03% | 2,402 |
| Giles | 3,192 | 40.95% | 4,462 | 57.24% | 141 | 1.81% | -1,270 | -16.29% | 7,795 |
| Gloucester | 6,916 | 35.98% | 12,089 | 62.89% | 217 | 1.13% | -5,173 | -26.91% | 19,222 |
| Goochland | 4,813 | 38.31% | 7,643 | 60.84% | 106 | 0.85% | -2,830 | -22.53% | 12,562 |
| Grayson | 2,480 | 34.35% | 4,540 | 62.88% | 200 | 2.77% | -2,060 | -28.53% | 7,220 |
| Greene | 3,174 | 38.43% | 4,980 | 60.29% | 106 | 1.28% | -1,806 | -21.86% | 8,260 |
| Greensville | 3,122 | 63.88% | 1,729 | 35.38% | 36 | 0.74% | 1,393 | 28.50% | 4,887 |
| Halifax | 8,126 | 48.23% | 8,600 | 51.04% | 124 | 0.73% | -474 | -2.81% | 16,850 |
| Hampton | 46,917 | 69.05% | 20,476 | 30.14% | 550 | 0.81% | 26,441 | 38.91% | 67,943 |
| Hanover | 18,447 | 32.80% | 37,344 | 66.39% | 457 | 0.81% | -18,897 | -33.59% | 56,248 |
| Harrisonburg | 8,444 | 57.54% | 6,048 | 41.21% | 183 | 1.25% | 2,396 | 16.33% | 14,675 |
| Henrico | 86,323 | 55.70% | 67,381 | 43.48% | 1,262 | 0.82% | 18,942 | 12.22% | 154,966 |
| Henry | 11,118 | 44.09% | 13,758 | 54.56% | 339 | 1.35% | -2,640 | -10.47% | 25,215 |
| Highland | 590 | 37.97% | 930 | 59.85% | 34 | 2.18% | -340 | -21.88% | 1,554 |
| Hopewell | 5,285 | 55.49% | 4,149 | 43.56% | 90 | 0.95% | 1,136 | 11.93% | 9,524 |
| Isle of Wight | 8,573 | 42.87% | 11,258 | 56.30% | 166 | 0.83% | -2,685 | -13.43% | 19,997 |
| James City | 17,352 | 44.95% | 20,912 | 54.17% | 339 | 0.88% | -3,560 | -9.22% | 38,603 |
| King and Queen | 1,918 | 51.77% | 1,763 | 47.58% | 24 | 0.65% | 155 | 4.19% | 3,705 |
| King George | 4,473 | 42.71% | 5,888 | 56.22% | 113 | 1.07% | -1,415 | -13.51% | 10,474 |
| King William | 3,344 | 39.87% | 4,966 | 59.20% | 78 | 0.93% | -1,622 | -19.33% | 8,388 |
| Lancaster | 3,235 | 46.63% | 3,647 | 52.57% | 56 | 0.80% | -412 | -5.94% | 6,938 |
| Lee | 3,219 | 34.89% | 5,825 | 63.13% | 183 | 1.98% | -2,606 | -28.24% | 9,227 |
| Lexington | 1,543 | 62.24% | 914 | 36.87% | 22 | 0.89% | 629 | 25.37% | 2,479 |
| Loudoun | 74,845 | 53.67% | 63,336 | 45.42% | 1,278 | 0.91% | 11,509 | 8.25% | 139,459 |
| Louisa | 6,978 | 45.45% | 8,182 | 53.29% | 193 | 1.26% | -1,204 | -7.84% | 15,353 |
| Lunenburg | 2,703 | 47.84% | 2,900 | 51.33% | 47 | 0.83% | -197 | -3.49% | 5,650 |
| Lynchburg | 16,269 | 47.37% | 17,638 | 51.36% | 434 | 1.27% | -1,369 | -3.99% | 34,341 |
| Madison | 2,862 | 42.72% | 3,758 | 56.10% | 79 | 1.18% | -896 | -13.38% | 6,699 |
| Manassas | 7,518 | 55.17% | 5,975 | 43.85% | 134 | 0.98% | 1,543 | 11.32% | 13,627 |
| Manassas Park | 2,463 | 59.49% | 1,634 | 39.47% | 43 | 1.04% | 829 | 20.02% | 4,140 |
| Martinsville | 4,139 | 63.48% | 2,311 | 35.44% | 70 | 1.08% | 1,828 | 28.04% | 6,520 |
| Mathews | 1,934 | 35.55% | 3,456 | 63.53% | 50 | 0.92% | -1,522 | -27.98% | 5,440 |
| Mecklenburg | 7,127 | 47.26% | 7,817 | 51.83% | 138 | 0.91% | -690 | -4.57% | 15,082 |
| Middlesex | 2,391 | 39.81% | 3,545 | 59.02% | 70 | 1.17% | -1,154 | -19.21% | 6,006 |
| Montgomery | 21,031 | 51.73% | 19,028 | 46.81% | 594 | 1.46% | 2,003 | 4.92% | 40,653 |
| Nelson | 4,391 | 53.99% | 3,647 | 44.84% | 95 | 1.17% | 744 | 9.15% | 8,133 |
| New Kent | 3,493 | 34.96% | 6,385 | 63.91% | 113 | 1.13% | -2,892 | -28.95% | 9,991 |
| Newport News | 51,972 | 63.93% | 28,667 | 35.26% | 656 | 0.81% | 23,305 | 28.67% | 81,295 |
| Norfolk | 62,819 | 71.03% | 24,814 | 28.06% | 813 | 0.91% | 38,005 | 42.97% | 88,446 |
| Northampton | 3,800 | 57.70% | 2,713 | 41.19% | 73 | 1.11% | 1,087 | 16.51% | 6,586 |
| Northumberland | 3,312 | 44.72% | 4,041 | 54.56% | 53 | 0.72% | -729 | -9.84% | 7,406 |
| Norton | 743 | 49.14% | 744 | 49.21% | 25 | 1.65% | -1 | -0.07% | 1,512 |
| Nottoway | 3,413 | 48.84% | 3,499 | 50.07% | 76 | 1.09% | -86 | -1.23% | 6,988 |
| Orange | 7,107 | 44.98% | 8,506 | 53.83% | 188 | 1.19% | -1,399 | -8.85% | 15,801 |
| Page | 4,235 | 40.76% | 6,041 | 58.15% | 113 | 1.09% | -1,806 | -17.39% | 10,389 |
| Patrick | 2,879 | 33.75% | 5,491 | 64.37% | 161 | 1.88% | -2,612 | -30.62% | 8,531 |
| Petersburg | 13,774 | 88.64% | 1,583 | 10.19% | 183 | 1.17% | 12,191 | 78.45% | 15,540 |
| Pittsylvania | 11,415 | 37.51% | 18,730 | 61.55% | 288 | 0.94% | -7,315 | -24.04% | 30,433 |
| Poquoson | 1,748 | 24.74% | 5,229 | 74.01% | 88 | 1.25% | -3,481 | -49.27% | 7,065 |
| Portsmouth | 32,327 | 69.27% | 13,984 | 29.97% | 354 | 0.76% | 18,343 | 39.30% | 46,665 |
| Powhatan | 4,237 | 29.31% | 10,088 | 69.78% | 131 | 0.91% | -5,851 | -40.47% | 14,456 |
| Prince Edward | 5,101 | 54.34% | 4,174 | 44.46% | 113 | 1.20% | 927 | 9.88% | 9,388 |
| Prince George | 7,130 | 44.55% | 8,752 | 54.68% | 124 | 0.77% | -1,622 | -10.13% | 16,006 |
| Prince William | 93,435 | 57.52% | 67,621 | 41.63% | 1,390 | 0.85% | 25,814 | 15.89% | 162,446 |
| Pulaski | 5,918 | 39.32% | 8,857 | 58.85% | 275 | 1.83% | -2,939 | -19.53% | 15,050 |
| Radford | 2,930 | 53.97% | 2,418 | 44.54% | 81 | 1.49% | 512 | 9.43% | 5,429 |
| Rappahannock | 2,105 | 47.79% | 2,227 | 50.56% | 73 | 1.65% | -122 | -2.77% | 4,405 |
| Richmond | 1,618 | 43.20% | 2,092 | 55.86% | 35 | 0.94% | -474 | -12.66% | 3,745 |
| Richmond City | 73,623 | 79.09% | 18,649 | 20.03% | 813 | 0.88% | 54,974 | 59.06% | 93,085 |
| Roanoke | 19,812 | 38.87% | 30,571 | 59.97% | 592 | 1.16% | -10,759 | -21.10% | 50,975 |
| Roanoke City | 24,934 | 61.15% | 15,394 | 37.76% | 444 | 1.09% | 9,540 | 23.39% | 40,772 |
| Rockbridge | 4,347 | 42.64% | 5,732 | 56.22% | 116 | 1.14% | -1,385 | -13.58% | 10,195 |
| Rockingham | 10,453 | 31.36% | 22,468 | 67.40% | 413 | 1.24% | -12,015 | -36.04% | 33,334 |
| Russell | 4,932 | 42.91% | 6,389 | 55.59% | 173 | 1.50% | -1,457 | -12.68% | 11,494 |
| Salem | 5,164 | 41.63% | 7,088 | 57.13% | 154 | 1.24% | -1,924 | -15.50% | 12,406 |
| Scott | 2,725 | 27.59% | 6,980 | 70.68% | 170 | 1.73% | -4,255 | -43.09% | 9,875 |
| Shenandoah | 6,912 | 35.96% | 12,005 | 62.45% | 306 | 1.59% | -5,093 | -26.49% | 19,223 |
| Smyth | 4,239 | 34.46% | 7,817 | 63.54% | 246 | 2.00% | -3,578 | -29.08% | 12,302 |
| Southampton | 4,402 | 48.55% | 4,583 | 50.55% | 82 | 0.90% | -181 | -2.00% | 9,067 |
| Spotsylvania | 24,897 | 46.05% | 28,610 | 52.91% | 562 | 1.04% | -3,713 | -6.86% | 54,069 |
| Stafford | 25,716 | 46.37% | 29,221 | 52.69% | 518 | 0.94% | -3,505 | -6.32% | 55,455 |
| Staunton | 5,569 | 50.56% | 5,330 | 48.39% | 116 | 1.05% | 239 | 2.17% | 11,015 |
| Suffolk | 22,446 | 56.24% | 17,165 | 43.01% | 297 | 0.75% | 5,281 | 13.23% | 39,908 |
| Surry | 2,626 | 60.72% | 1,663 | 38.45% | 36 | 0.83% | 963 | 22.27% | 4,325 |
| Sussex | 3,301 | 61.55% | 2,026 | 37.78% | 36 | 0.67% | 1,275 | 23.77% | 5,363 |
| Tazewell | 5,596 | 32.80% | 11,201 | 65.65% | 264 | 1.55% | -5,605 | -32.85% | 17,061 |
| Virginia Beach | 98,885 | 49.14% | 100,319 | 49.85% | 2,045 | 1.01% | -1,434 | -0.71% | 201,249 |
| Warren | 6,997 | 43.39% | 8,879 | 55.06% | 250 | 1.55% | -1,882 | -11.67% | 16,126 |
| Washington | 8,063 | 32.91% | 16,077 | 65.62% | 360 | 1.47% | -8,014 | -32.71% | 24,500 |
| Waynesboro | 3,906 | 44.09% | 4,815 | 54.35% | 139 | 1.56% | -909 | -10.26% | 8,860 |
| Westmoreland | 4,577 | 54.64% | 3,719 | 44.40% | 81 | 0.96% | 858 | 10.24% | 8,377 |
| Williamsburg | 4,328 | 63.77% | 2,353 | 34.67% | 106 | 0.95% | 1,975 | 29.10% | 6,787 |
| Winchester | 5,268 | 52.02% | 4,725 | 46.66% | 133 | 1.32% | 543 | 5.36% | 10,126 |
| Wise | 4,995 | 35.33% | 8,914 | 63.05% | 229 | 1.62% | -3,919 | -27.72% | 14,138 |
| Wythe | 4,107 | 32.88% | 8,207 | 65.70% | 177 | 1.42% | -4,100 | -32.82% | 12,491 |
| York | 13,700 | 40.42% | 19,833 | 58.51% | 364 | 1.07% | -6,133 | -18.09% | 33,897 |
| Totals | 1,959,532 | 52.63% | 1,725,005 | 46.33% | 38,723 | 1.04% | 234,527 | 6.30% | 3,723,260 |

Counties and independent cities that flipped from Democratic to Republican

- Buchanan (largest city: Grundy)
- Dickenson (largest borough: Clintwood)

Counties and independent cities that flipped from Republican to Democratic

- Buckingham (largest borough: Buckingham)
- Caroline (largest borough: Bowling Green)
- Chesapeake (independent city)
- Essex (largest borough: Tappahannock)
- Harrisonburg (independent city)
- Henrico (largest borough: Richmond)
- Hopewell (independent city)
- King and Queen (largest borough: King and Queen Courthouse)
- Loudoun (largest borough: Leesburg)
- Manassas (independent city)
- Manassas Park (independent city)
- Montgomery (largest borough: Blacksburg)
- Prince William (largest borough: Manassas)
- Radford (independent city)
- Staunton (independent city)
- Suffolk (independent city)
- Westmoreland (largest borough: Montross)
- Winchester (independent city)

=== By congressional district ===
Barack Obama carried six of the state's 11 congressional districts. Both candidates carried two districts won by the other party.

| District | McCain | Obama | Representative |
|---|---|---|---|
| 1st | 51% | 48% | Jo Ann Davis (110th Congress) |
| 1st | 51% | 48% | Rob Wittman (111th Congress) |
| 2nd | 48% | 50% | Thelma Drake (110th Congress) |
| 2nd | 48% | 50% | Glenn Nye (111th Congress) |
| 3rd | 24% | 76% | Bobby Scott |
| 4th | 49% | 50% | Randy Forbes |
| 5th | 51% | 48% | Virgil Goode (110th Congress) |
| 5th | 51% | 48% | Tom Perriello (111th Congress) |
| 6th | 57% | 42% | Bob Goodlatte |
| 7th | 53% | 46% | Eric Cantor |
| 8th | 30% | 69% | Jim Moran |
| 9th | 59% | 40% | Rick Boucher |
| 10th | 46% | 53% | Frank Wolf |
| 11th | 42% | 57% | Thomas M. Davis (110th Congress) |
| 11th | 42% | 57% | Gerry Connolly (111th Congress) |

== Electors ==
Technically the voters of Virginia cast their ballots for electors: representatives to the Electoral College. Virginia is allocated 13 electors because it has 11 congressional districts and 2 senators. All candidates who appear on the ballot or qualify to receive write-in votes must submit a list of 13 electors, who pledge to vote for their candidate and his or her running mate. Whoever wins the majority of votes in the state is awarded all 13 electoral votes. Their chosen electors then vote for president and vice president. Although electors are pledged to their candidate and running mate, they are not obligated to vote for them. An elector who votes for someone other than his or her candidate is known as a faithless elector.

The electors of each state and the District of Columbia met on December 15, 2008, to cast their votes for president and vice president. The Electoral College itself never meets as one body. Instead the electors from each state and the District of Columbia met in their respective capitols.

The following were the members of the Electoral College from the state. All 13 were pledged to Barack Obama and Joe Biden:

1. Christia Rey
2. Sandra Brandt
3. Betty Squire
4. Susan Johnston Rowland
5. Marc Finney
6. Dorothy Blackwell
7. James Harold Allen Boyd
8. Marian Van Landingham
9. Robert Edgar Childress
10. Rolland Winter
11. Janet Carver
12. Michael Jon
13. Sophie Ann Salley
