= List of 2012 United States presidential electors =

This is a list of electors (members of the Electoral College) who cast ballots to elect the President of the United States and Vice President of the United States in the 2012 presidential election. There are 538 electors from the 50 states and the District of Columbia. While every state except Nebraska and Maine chooses the electors by statewide vote, many states require that one elector be designated for each congressional district. Except where otherwise noted, such designations refer to the elector's residence in that district rather than election by the voters of the district.

== Alabama ==
Electors: 9, pledged to vote for Mitt Romney for President and Paul Ryan for Vice President

- James T. Waggoner state senator
- Will Sellers
- Terry Lathan
- Susan Neuwein
- Robert Fincher
- Lynn Robinson
- James Elbert Peters
- Edward S. Allen
- Robert A. Cusanelli

== Alaska ==
Electors: 3, pledged to vote for Mitt Romney for President and Paul Ryan for Vice President

- Kristie Babcock of Kenai
- Kathleen Miller of Fairbanks
- Chris L. Nelson of Anchorage

== Arizona ==
Electors: 11, pledged to vote for Mitt Romney for President and Paul Ryan for Vice President

- Don M. Ascoli, Arizona Republican Party county chair for Gila County
- Malcolm Barrett Jr., Yavapai County Republican Committee Chairman
- Paul Gilbert
- Robert Haney
- Leona Johnston
- Gregory Mendoza, Gila River Indian Community Governor
- Steve Montenegro, Arizona House of Representatives Speaker Pro Tempore
- Kristine Morrissey
- Thomas Morrissey, Arizona Republican Party Chair
- John D. Rhodes
- C. T. Wright

== Arkansas ==
Electors: 6, pledged to vote for Mitt Romney for President and Paul Ryan for Vice President

- Larry Bailey of Hot Springs
- Jonathan Barnett of Siloam Springs, State Representative
- Reta Hamilton of Bella Vista, Member Republican National Committee
- Robin Lundstrum of Springdale
- Benny Speaks of Mountain Home
- Doyle Webb of Little Rock, Arkansas Republican Party Chairman

== California ==
Electors: 55, pledged to Barack Obama and Joe Biden

- Michael Williams Adams
- Alisha Aguilar
- Maria Teresa Becerra
- Janine Vivienne Bera
- Karen Chang
- Aaron Samuel Conaway
- Greg Conger
- Raymond Cordova
- Mollie Culver
- Dennis Donohue
- Sandy Emberland
- Ernesto Encinas
- John Freidenrich
- Felipe Fuentes, member, California State Assembly
- Patricia W. Garamendi
- Bobby Glaser
- Dolores Clara Huerta
- William H. Kysella, Jr.
- Laura Lee
- Daniel Leroux
- Dave Low
- Mark Macarro, Chair Pechanga Band of Luiseno Mission Indians
- Jane Morrison
- Donald Mullen
- Chris M. Myers
- Anu Natarajan, Fremont City Councilmember
- Sandy L. Nixon
- Ricardo Roybal Olivarez
- Louis Paulson
- Geoffrey Pete
- Bonnie Burns Price
- Andre Quintero, Mayor of El Monte
- Michael Ray
- Terry Reardon
- Brooke Reed
- Gwen Regalia, former mayor of Walnut Creek
- Meriam Louise Reynosa
- Gregory Lucas Rodriguez
- Alexandra Rooker
- Gary Rotto
- Alfonso Sanchez
- Barbara Schraeger
- John Harold Simpson
- Laurie Stalnaker
- Ranada Stephenson
- Xiaoguang Sun
- Maeley Lock Tom
- Kyriakos Tsakopoulos
- Christopher Tumbeiro
- Ernest Joseph Vasti
- Ruben Antonio Villalobos
- Dean E. Vogel, President, California Teachers Association
- Diane Watson, former U.S. Representative
- Sanford Weiner
- Steven Ray Young

== Colorado ==
Electors: 9, pledged to Barack Obama and Joe Biden

- Anthony Eric Graves of Denver
- Terry Phillips of Louisville
- Gilbert Ortiz of Pueblo
- Deborah Pilch of Greeley
- Thomas E. Cronin of Colorado Springs
- Laurence W. Steele of Aurora
- Richard O'Dean Swain of Lakewood
- Alvin D. Rivera of Pueblo
- Polly Baca of Denver, past Chair, Democratic Party of Colorado

== Connecticut ==
Electors: 7, pledged to Barack Obama and Joe Biden

- Ronald C. Schurin of Mansfield
- Mildred Torres-Ferguson of Meriden
- James C. Ezzes of Westport
- Larry Pleasant Town Council member of Bloomfield
- Jason Jakubowski of West Hartford
- Carmen Colon of Bridgeport
- Jacqueline James of New Haven

== Delaware ==
Electors: 3, pledged to Barack Obama and Joe Biden

- Peter Keegan
- Abby Betts
- Delores McLamb

== District of Columbia ==
Electors: 3, pledged to Barack Obama and Joe Biden

- Yvette M. Alexander DC Councilmember
- Donald R. Dinan
- William P. Lightfoot

== Florida ==
Electors: 29, pledged to Barack Obama and Joe Biden

- Lynette Acosta
- Burt Aaronson
- Scott Arceneaux, former director of the Louisiana State Democratic Party
- T. Wayne Bailey
- Carol M. Bartleson
- Leon Belton
- Tim Bottcher
- Alan Clendenin
- Ana Cruz
- Buddy Dyer, Mayor of Orlando
- Joe Faulk
- Rita Fernandino
- Joe Gibbons, Member, Florida House of Representatives
- Audrey Gibson, member, Florida Senate
- Dina Heffernan
- Vonzelle Johnson
- Luis Lauredo
- Elena McCollough
- Amy Mercado
- Vivian Mitchell
- Jean Monestime, Commissioner, Miami-Dade County
- Susannah Randolph
- Rod Smith, Chair Florida Democratic Party
- Justin Spiller
- Bob Troy
- Kirk Wagar
- Ashley M. Walker
- Alan Williams, Member, Florida House of Representatives
- Jeanette Wynn

== Georgia ==
Electors: 16, pledged to Mitt Romney and Paul Ryan

- Teresa Jeter Chappell
- James Randolph Evans, Member, Republican National Committee
- Sue P. Everhart, Chair, Georgia Republican Party
- Darrell L. Galloway
- Linda D. Herren, member, Republican National Committee
- Kathy S. Hildebrand
- Hsiao Lung Ho
- Anne Ware Lewis
- Kelly Lynn Loeffler
- Robert Luther Mayzes
- Lautoria Estes Morgan
- Eugene E. Pearson, Jr.
- George Ervin Perdue, III, former Governor
- Frank B. Strickland
- Eric J. Tanenblatt
- Julianne Elizabeth Thompson

== Hawaii ==
Electors: 4, pledged to Barack Obama and Joe Biden

- Michael Golojuch. Sr.
- Marina Schwartz
- Debbie Shimizu
- Marie Dolores (Dolly) Strazar, member, Democratic National Committee

== Idaho ==
Electors: 4, pledged to Mitt Romney and Paul Ryan

- Travis Hawkes, of Meridian. Mitt Romney's Idaho Finance co-chair
- Teresa Luna, of Boise
- Jason Risch, of Boise
- Damond Watkins, of Idaho Falls, member, Republican National Committee

== Illinois ==
Electors: 20, pledged to Barack Obama and Joe Biden

- Carrie Austin, Alderman, City of Chicago
- Julia Kennedy Beckman
- Barb Brown
- Christine Cegelis
- Ashley Sachdeva
- Barbara Flynn Currie, Member, Illinois House of Representatives
- John P. Daley
- Vera Davis
- James A. Deleo, former member, Illinois Senate
- Lynn Foster
- Lauren Beth Gash, former member, Illinois House of Representatives
- Mark Guethle
- Debbie Halvorson, former US Representative
- Don Johnston
- Shirley McCombs
- Andrew R. Madigan
- Ricardo Muñoz, Alderman, City of Chicago
- William Marovit
- John Nelson
- Toni Preckwinkle, President of the Cook County Board
- Nancy Shepherdson

== Indiana ==
Electors: 11 pledged to Mitt Romney and Paul Ryan

- Robert Grand, of Indianapolis President Indiana Works
- Eric Holcomb, of Indianapolis. Chair Indiana Republican Party
- Susan Lightle, of Greenfield
- Scott Molin, replacement for Beverly Bush, of Kirklin
- Jamey Noel, of Jeffersonville
- William Ruppel, of North Manchester. Past member Indiana House of Representatives
- Steve Shine, of Fort Wayne
- William "Bill" Springer, of Sullivan
- Pearl Swanigan, of Indianapolis
- Charles Williams, of Valparaiso
- Kyle Hupfer, of Pendleton

== Iowa ==
Electors: 6 pledged to Barack Obama and Joe Biden

- Glen Salisberry
- William Gluba Mayor of Davenport
- Dale Creech
- Theodore Herrick, of Jefferson
- Marc Wallace, of Des Moines
- Jan Shirley

== Kansas ==
Electors: 6, pledged to Mitt Romney and Paul Ryan:

- Amanda Adkins, Chair, Kansas Republican Party
- Kelly Arnold, Member, Republican National Committee
- Jeff Colyer, Lieutenant Governor
- Randy Duncan
- Todd Tiahrt Former Member of Congress
- Helen Van Etten, Member Republican National Committee

== Kentucky ==
Electors: 8, pledged to Mitt Romney and Paul Ryan:

- Wilma W. Cooper of Hopkinsville, KY; elector for Kentucky's 1st congressional district
- Mary Ann Baron of Greensburg, KY; elector for Kentucky's 2nd congressional district
- Lawrence E. Cox of Louisville, KY; elector for Kentucky's 3rd congressional district
- Kevin Sell of Alexandria, KY; elector for Kentucky's 4th congressional district
- Robert L. Mitchell of Corbin, KY; elector for Kentucky's 5th congressional district
- Dave Disponett of Lawrenceburg, KY; elector for Kentucky's 6th congressional district
- Mira Ball of Lexington, KY; elector at-large
- Terry E. Forcht of Corbin, KY; elector at-large

== Louisiana ==
Electors: 8, pledged to Mitt Romney and Paul Ryan:

- Jimmy C. Allen
- Michael Bayham
- Harold O. Coates
- Christian J. Gil
- Legena "Gena" Gore
- Louis S. Gurvich, Jr. of New Orleans
- Garrett C. Monti of Luling
- S. Scott Wilfong of Baton Rouge

== Maine ==
Electors: 4, pledged to Barack Obama and Joe Biden

- Diane Denk
- Jill Duson, Member Portland City Council
- Craig Hickman
- Marianne Stevens, Vice Chair, State Democratic Party

== Maryland ==
Electors: 10, pledged to Barack Obama and Joe Biden

- Kumar Barve, Member, Maryland House of Delegates
- Jonathan K. Branch
- Tashea Brodgins
- Helen L. Dale
- Cheryl Everman
- Richard Madaleno, Jr., Member, Maryland State Senate
- Gary W. Michael
- Joseline Peña-Melnyk, Member, Maryland House of Delegates
- Beth Swoap, Secretary, Maryland Democratic State Committee
- Alonzo Washington

== Massachusetts ==
Electors: 11, pledged to Barack Obama and Joe Biden

- Sandi E. Bagley
- Janet M. Beyer
- James Eliseo DiTullio of Boston
- Louis A. Elisa, II
- Paul J. Giorgio
- Candy Glazer
- Susan M. Kennedy
- Mike Lake
- James McGowan
- Karen L. Payne
- Diane M. Saxe, Member Democratic National Committee

== Michigan ==
Electors: 16, pledged to Barack Obama and Joe Biden

- Cindy Estrada of Whitmore Lake
- Steve Cook of Lake Odessa
- Dorothy Johnson of Kincheloe
- Marge Faville of Muskegon
- Marion Vanderveen of Grand Rapids
- Toni Sessoms of Weidman
- Norwood Jewell of Davison
- Jess Minks of Buchanan
- Howard Pizzo of Lansing
- Joanne Murphy of Brighton
- Peggy Ciaramitaro of Roseville representing the 9th Congressional District
- James Winne of Washington Twp. representing the 10th Congressional District
- Walter Sobczak of Novi
- Jane Ahern of Dearborn
- Hilliard Hampton of Inkster
- Edna Bell of Detroit

== Minnesota ==
Electors: 10, pledged to Barack Obama and Joe Biden

- Gabe Aderhold of Edina
- Lucy Buckner of Burnsville
- Jettie Ann Hill of Minneapolis
- Dee Long of Minnetonka, former Speaker of the Minnesota House of Representatives
- Joe Moren of Hibbing
- Al Patton of Sartell
- Shanti Shah of Eden Prairie
- Russ Warren of Mounds View
- Janet Weir of Mankato
- Paul Wright of Hutchinson

== Mississippi ==
Electors: 6, pledged to Mitt Romney and Paul Ryan

- Austin Barbour - nephew of former Mississippi governor Haley Barbour, and finance director for the Romney campaign.
- Ricky Jay Calhoon
- Charles Cannada (Appointed to fill the vacancy created when Wirt A. Yerger, Jr., the first state chairman of the Mississippi Republican Party, did not attend.) Private investor and former MCI executive.
- William Randolph James
- William D. "Billy" Mounger - former Reagan advisor, and fundraiser to former Senator Trent Lott.
- Billy R. Powell - Secretary of the Mississippi Ethics Commission.

== Missouri ==
Electors: 10, pledged to Mitt Romney and Paul Ryan

- Mavis C. Busiek
- Stanley Cox, Member, Missouri House of Representatives
- Matthew G. Gertsner
- Robert L. Green
- John Judd
- Michael Koop
- R. Layne Morrill
- Penelope Z. Quigg
- David Stokes
- Kurt Witzel

== Montana ==
Electors: 3, pledged to Mitt Romney and Paul Ryan

- Thelma Baker
- John Brenden, member, Montana Senate
- Errol Galt, Member, Republican National Committee

== Nebraska ==
Electors: 5, pledged to Mitt Romney and Paul Ryan

- Mary Crawford
- Joe Hampton
- Mick Jensen
- Kay Orr, former governor
- Arlene Steier

== Nevada ==
Electors: 6, pledged to Barack Obama and Joe Biden

- Samuel Lieberman
- John Ponticello
- Marty Ann McGarry Nevada Democratic Party county chair for Carson City
- Randy Soltero
- Rose McKinney-James
- Theresa Benitez-Thompson

== New Hampshire ==
Electors: 4, pledged to Barack Obama and Joe Biden

- James Demers of Concord
- Joanne Dowdell of Portsmouth, Member, Democratic National Committee
- Mary Rauh of New Castle
- C. Arthur Soucy of Manchester

== New Jersey ==
Electors: 14, pledged to Barack Obama and Joe Biden

- Frank Argote-Freyre
- Marion G. Costanza
- Suzanne Marshall Discher
- Christopher Irving
- Jeffrey Laurenti
- John J. McCarthy
- Ileana Montes
- Ida Ochoteco
- Paul Penna
- Robert F. Renaud
- Virginia N. Scott
- Henry G. Sykes
- Philip Thigpen
- Beth E. Timberman, Freeholder Salem County

== New Mexico ==
Electors: 5, pledged to Barack Obama and Joe Biden

- Elizabeth "Lisa" Chavez
- Katherine "Kat" Duran
- Tracy Goodluck, Chair Native American Caucus of the Democratic Party of New Mexico
- Pamelya Herndon
- David Thomson

== New York ==
Electors: 29, pledged to Barack Obama and Joe Biden

- Scott Adams
- Anne Marie Anzalone
- Steve Bellone, Suffolk County Executive
- Byron Brown, Mayor of Buffalo
- Karim Camara, State Assemblyman
- Mario Cilento, President of the New York State AFL-CIO
- Sheila Comar, New York State Democratic Party Executive Committee Chair
- Walter Cooper
- Bill de Blasio, New York City Public Advocate
- Ruben Diaz, Jr., Bronx Borough President
- Thomas DiNapoli, State Comptroller
- Robert Duffy, Lieutenant Governor
- Emily Giske
- George Gresham, President of the 1199SEIU
- Peter Harckham, Majority Leader of the Westchester County Board of Legislators
- Hakeem Jeffries, United States Congressman-elect and State Assemblyman
- Ken Jenkins, Chair of the Westchester County Board of Legislators
- Gerald D. Jennings, Mayor of Albany
- Virginia Kee
- Stephanie Miner, Mayor of Syracuse
- Joseph Morelle, State Assemblyman
- Félix Ortiz, State Assemblyman
- Christine C. Quinn, New York City Council Speaker
- Eric Schneiderman, State Attorney General
- Sheldon Silver, State Assembly Speaker
- Archie Spigner
- Irene Stein, Tompkins County Democratic Party Chair
- Scott Stringer, Manhattan Borough President
- Keith L.T. Wright, State Assemblyman

== North Carolina ==
Electors: 15, pledged to Mitt Romney and Paul Ryan

- Don Abernathy
- Dodie Allen
- Charles Barrett
- Michael Esser
- Barbara Hines
- Robert Levy
- Paul Penney
- Felice Pete
- James Art Pope, Former Member, North Carolina House of Representatives
- James Proctor
- David Ruden
- Mary Jo Shepherd
- William Shillito
- Garry Terry
- Ashley Woolard

== North Dakota ==
Electors: 3, pledged to Mitt Romney and Paul Ryan

- Layton Freborg of Underwood, Member, North Dakota Senate
- Mary Lee of Bismarck
- David Nething of Jamestown, Member, North Dakota Senate

== Ohio ==
Electors: 18, pledged to Barack Obama and Joe Biden

- Ann Block
- Sarah Brown-Clark
- Grace Anne Cherrington
- Michael Friedman
- William J. Healy II, Mayor Canton
- Tracy Heard, Member, Ohio House of Representatives
- Cathina Hourani
- Pernel Jones, Jr., Member, Cuyahoga County Council
- Wade Kapszukiewicz
- Ryan Kolegar
- Constance Lighthall
- Kevin Malecek
- Mark Owens
- Chris Redfern, Chair, Ohio Democratic Party
- Ted Strickland, Former Governor
- Daniel Traicoff
- Jeremy Van Meter
- William Young

== Oklahoma ==
Electors: 7, pledged to Mitt Romney and Paul Ryan

- Jason Cowen
- Duane Crumbacher
- David Holt, Member, Oklahoma State Senate
- Joe Peters
- Mark Thomas
- Lawrence A. Williamson
- Lynn Windel

== Oregon ==
Electors: 7, pledged to Barack Obama and Joe Biden

- Mike Bohan of Beaverton
- Shirley Cairns of Oakland
- Joe Smith of Portland
- Michael Miles of Grants Pass
- Roy Pulvers of Portland, replacement for Frank Dixon
- Sam Sappington of Albany
- Meredith Wood Smith of Portland, Chair Democratic Party of Oregon

== Pennsylvania ==
Electors: 20, pledged to Barack Obama and Joe Biden

- Mark L. Alderman of Montgomery County
- Cindy Bass of Philadelphia County
- Richard Bloomingdale of Dauphin County
- C. Kim Bracey of York County
- James R. Burn, Jr. of Allegheny County
- Jay Costa of Allegheny County
- Frank Dermody of Allegheny County
- Rich Fitzgerald of Allegheny County
- Penny Gerber of Montgomery County
- Amanda Green Hawkins of Allegheny County
- Vincent J. Hughes of Philadelphia County
- Susan Golden Jacobson of Philadelphia County
- Clifford B. Levine of Allegheny County
- Robert McCord of Montgomery County
- Michael Nutter of Philadelphia County
- Lazar M. Palnick of Allegheny County
- Roxanne G. Pauline of Lackawanna County
- Jose Rosado of Lehigh County
- Cynthia D. Shapira of Allegheny County
- Josh Shapiro of Montgomery County

== Rhode Island ==
Electors: 4, pledged to Barack Obama and Joe Biden

- Marvin L. Abney of Newport
- Emily A. Marajian of Providence
- L. Susan Weiner of East Greenwich
- Mark S. Weiner of East Greenwich, Former State Party Chair, Democratic fundraiser

== South Carolina ==
Electors: 9, pledged to Mitt Romney and Paul Ryan

- Bruce Chadwick Connelly Chair, South Carolina Republican Party
- Drew McKissick Parliamentarian, South Carolina Republican Party
- Cynthia F. Costa, Member, Republican National Committee
- Randall S. Page
- Janice C. McCord
- Betty Sheppard Poe
- Sandra R. Stroman
- Roy Rex Lindsey III
- James Edward Jerow

== South Dakota ==
Electors: 3, pledged to Mitt Romney and Paul Ryan

- Dennis Daugaard, Governor
- Matt Michels, Lt. Governor
- Marty Jackley, State Attorney General

== Tennessee ==
Electors: 11, pledged to Mitt Romney and Paul Ryan

- Jennie T. McCabe (At-large)
- David Snodgrass (At-large), Chair Tennessee Republican Party
- Scott Niswonger (First Congressional District)
- Joe Bailey (Second Congressional District), Vice Mayor, City of Knoxville
- Jerry Sink (Third Congressional District), Tennessee Finance Leadership Team for Mitt Romney
- Andy Adams (Fourth Congressional District)
- Bob Rial (Fifth Congressional District), Dickson County Mayor
- Ruth Hagerty (Sixth Congressional District)
- Kurt Holbert (Seventh Congressional District), State Committeman
- Annabel Woodall (Eighth Congressional District), State Committeewoman
- Robert Bradley Martin (Ninth Congressional District), Former Tennessee legislator

== Texas ==
Electors: 38, pledged to Mitt Romney and Paul Ryan

- Keith Rothra
- Butch Davis, Republican Party of Texas Parliamentarian
- Tim McCord
- Clinton Evetts
- Benny Gordon
- Steve Jessup
- Paul Bettencort
- Walter Wilkerson, Jr.
- Bonnie Lugo
- Terri Flow
- Georgia Scott
- Kaye Moreno
- Jane Juett
- David Stone
- Sandra Cararas
- Mary Holmesly
- Matthew Johnson
- Nelda Eppes, Republican Party of Texas Sergeant-At-Arms
- Ruth Schiermeyer
- Johnny Lovejoy, II
- Patti Johnson
- Tim Turner
- Jennifer Weaver
- Royal Smith
- Linda Rogers
- Jean McIver
- Betty Stiles
- Texas Moore
- Richard Bernhard
- Thom Wilkins
- Bill Fairbrother
- Mary Ann Collins
- Loren Byers
- Samuel Owens
- Billie Zimmerman
- Daniel Whitton
- Steve Munisteri, Republican Party of Texas Chairman
- Carolyn Hodges

== Utah ==
Electors: 6, pledged to Mitt Romney and Paul Ryan

- John Swallow; at-large elector
- Kyle Hicks; representing Utah's 4th Congressional District
- Stan Lockhart; representing Utah's 3rd Congressional District
- Thomas Wright; representing Utah's 2nd Congressional District
- Fred Lampropoulos; at-large elector
- Terry Camp; representing Utah's 1st Congressional District

== Vermont ==
Electors: 3, pledged to Barack Obama and Joe Biden

- Sherry Merrick of Post Mills
- William Sander of Jeffersonville
- Kevin Christie of Hartford

== Virginia ==
Electors: 13, pledged to Barack Obama and Joe Biden

- Sandra W. Brandt
- Terry Carroll Frye
- Gary W. Crawford
- Christopher M. Daniel, Jr.
- Edna N. Frady
- Janyce N. Hedetniemi
- Susan Johnston Rowland
- Evan D. Macbeth
- Judy L. Mastrangeli
- Ben Ragsdale, Jr.
- Melanie B. Salyer
- Betty L. Squire
- Anita A. White

== Washington ==
Electors: 12, pledged to Barack Obama and Joe Biden

- Grifynn Marley Clay of Snohomish, WA; elector for Washington's 1st congressional district
- Dave W. Gossett of Mountlake Terrace, WA; elector for Washington's 2nd congressional district, Member, Snohomish County Council
- Kathleen A. Lawrence of Vancouver, WA; elector for Washington's 3rd congressional district
- George B. Fearing of Kennewick, WA; elector for Washington's 4th congressional district
- Rick Lloyd of Spokane Valley, WA; elector for Washington's 5th congressional district
- Gail Kirk of Tacoma, WA; elector for Washington's 6th congressional district
- Maria Ehsan of Seattle, WA; elector for Washington's 7th congressional district
- Elizabeth Satiacum of Olympia, WA; elector for Washington's 8th congressional district
- Georgia Spencer of Seattle, WA; elector for Washington's 9th congressional district
- Harvey Brooks of University Place, WA; elector for Washington's 10th congressional district
- Heather Fralick of Shoreline, WA; at-large elector
- Alec Stephens of Seattle, WA; at-large elector

== West Virginia ==
Electors: 5, pledged to Mitt Romney and Paul Ryan

- Betty Ireland
- John McCuskey
- Sarah Minear
- Mick Staton
- David Tyson

== Wisconsin ==
Electors: 10, pledged to Barack Obama and Joe Biden

- Peter Barca
- Fred Risser
- Gary Hawley
- Frederick P. Kessler
- Lori Compas
- Marcia Steele
- Christine Bremer Muggli
- Diana Miller
- JoCasta Zamarripa
- Mahlon Mitchell

== Wyoming ==
Electors: 3, pledged to Mitt Romney and Paul Ryan

- Ron Micheli of Fort Bridger
- Margaret Parry
- Susan Thomas

Preceded by 2008	Electoral College (United States); 2012	Succeeded by 2016
