= Terrence Murphy (New York politician) =

American politician, chiropractor, and business owner (born 1966)

Terrence P. Murphy
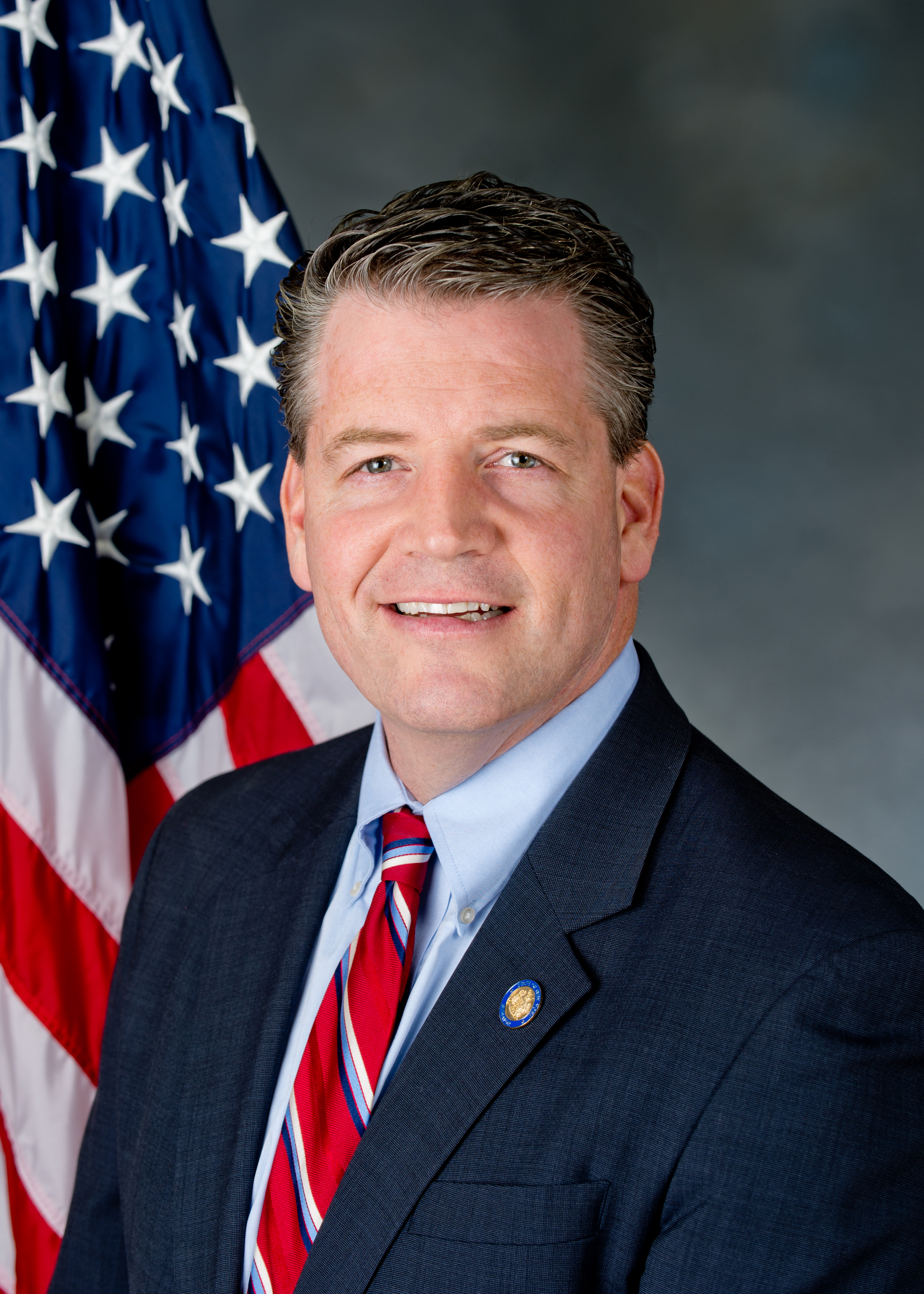

Member of the New York State Senate from the 40th district
- In office January 1, 2015 – December 31, 2018
- Preceded by: Greg Ball
- Succeeded by: Peter Harckham

Personal details
- Born: July 5, 1966 (age 60) Bronxville, New York, U.S.
- Party: Republican
- Spouse: Caroline
- Children: 3
- Education: Life Chiropractic College (BS); Life Chiropractic College (DC)
- Occupation: Chiropractor, Politician
- Website: www.voteformurphy.com
- Official Biography

Terrence P. Murphy (born July 5, 1966) is an American politician, chiropractor, and business owner from Jefferson Valley, New York. Murphy represented the 40th Senate District (which includes parts of Dutchess, Putnam and Westchester Counties) in the New York State Senate from 2015 to 2018.

== Early life ==
Murphy was born in Bronxville, New York, and grew up in Yorktown Heights, New York, the youngest of six children.

In 1999, he opened his own chiropractic practice, Yorktown Health and Wellness Center, in his hometown of Yorktown which is now closed. In addition to his chiropractor's office, for the next fifteen years, he served as an on-field volunteer medical advisor for local high school athletes. In 2006, along with his siblings, he opened a family restaurant, Murphy's Irish Restaurant and Bar, named in honor of his father.

He is married, with three children. His wife is a nurse. Together they founded a watchdog organization, Keeping Westchester Safe, which advocated for "Child Safety Zone" legislation, residency requirements for sex offenders that would prohibit them from residing within a certain distance of schools, playgrounds and other areas where children congregate.

== Political career ==
In 2009, Murphy ran for and was elected to the Yorktown Town Board and was re-elected for a second term in 2013. He had a not very close race for the Westchester County Board of Legislators in 2011, which he lost following a recount. Murphy and his fellow council members were credited with approving more than $300 million in long-awaited economic development projects within the town, many of which had stalled for years under previous administrations, including a $60 million overhaul of the Jefferson Valley Mall and the redevelopment and widening of the Route 202 corridor.

During his local races, Murphy was the top vote-getter in the town of Yorktown and received the highest ever number of votes cast for a Town Board member in 2013. As a Town Board member, he was invited to serve on both the New York State Assembly Task Force on Crime on Our Communities, also known as the Sex Offender Watch Task Force, as well as the Senate Task Force of Heroin and Opioid Addiction.

In 2014, Murphy was tapped to succeed Senator Greg Ball, who had decided not to run for re-election. The suburban seat was targeted by New York City Democrats including Mayor Bill de Blasio, who funneled over $500,000 to Murphy's opponent through the use of straw donor committees using a loophole in New York State campaign finance law. The move allowed a few donors to give contributions far in excess of the legal limit to evade the cap that would have otherwise applied. It was also alleged that de Blasio pressured donors with business before the City to make the donations to Murphy's opponent on his behalf, which made one donor feel "uncomfortable." The Mayor also sent staff to work on the campaign of Murphy's opponent. In turn, the election was cast by Murphy as a battle of New York City interests against those of Hudson Valley, with de Blasio portrayed as something of a "bogeyman" according to the Journal News.

Although the 2014 State Senate race was expected to be one of the closest in the State, Murphy defeated his opponent by over ten points. Upon taking office in January 2015, Murphy was named the chair of the Administrative Regulations Review Commission, an entity charged with reviewing proposed rules and regulations by State agencies and public authorities to examine their compliance with legislative intent and their potential impact on businesses and local governments. The Senator was also named to the Banks, Ethics, Labor, Local Government, Health, Investigations and Government Operations, and Mental Health committees. Murphy named combating heroin addiction and prescription drug abuse as a top priority for his first Senate term.

After being re-elected in 2016, Murphy was defeated by Democrat Peter Harckham in his 2018 re-election bid.

New York State Senate
Preceded by Greg Ball	New York State Senate, 40th District; 2015–2018	Succeeded by Peter Harckham
