= New York's 40th State Senate district =

American legislative district

Senator
Peter Harckham; D–South Salem
- Registration: 37.2% Democratic; 29.7% Republican; 25.8% No party preference
- Demographics: 73% White; 5% Black; 17% Hispanic; 4% Asian
- Population (2017): 309,474
- Registered voters: 210,879

New York's 40th State Senate district is one of 63 districts in the New York State Senate. It has been represented by Democrat Peter Harckham since 2019, following his defeat of incumbent Republican Terrence Murphy.

== Geography ==
District 40 takes in northern Westchester County and eastern Putnam County and Dutchess County in the Hudson Valley. It includes the communities of Yorktown, Cortlandt, Somers, Peekskill, Carmel, Southeast, Patterson, Pawling, and Beekman, among others.

The district overlaps with New York's 17th, 18th, and 19th congressional districts, and with the 92nd, 93rd, 94th, 95th, and 105th districts of the New York State Assembly.

== Recent election results ==
=== 2026 ===
2026 New York State Senate election, District 40
Party	Candidate	Votes	%
Democratic	Peter Harckham		
Working Families	Peter Harckham		
Total	Peter Harckham (incumbent)		
Republican	Sergio Esposito		
Conservative	Sergio Esposito		
Total	Sergio Esposito		
Write-in			
Total votes			

=== 2024 ===
2024 New York State Senate election, District 40
Party	Candidate	Votes	%
Democratic	Peter Harckham	84,088	
Working Families	Peter Harckham	4,494	
Total	Peter Harckham (incumbent)	88,582	53.6
Republican	Gina Arena	69,751	
Conservative	Gina Arena	6,909	
Total	Gina Arena	76,660	46.4
Write-in		59	0.0
Total votes		165,301	100.0
Democratic hold			

=== 2022 ===
2022 New York State Senate election, District 40
Party	Candidate	Votes	%
Democratic	Peter Harckham	62,027	
Working Families	Peter Harckham	4,392	
Total	Peter Harckham (incumbent)	66,419	53.4
Republican	Gina Arena	57,925	46.6
Write-in		20	0.0
Total votes		124,364	100.0
Democratic hold			

=== 2020 ===
2020 New York State Senate election, District 40
Party	Candidate	Votes	%
Democratic	Peter Harckham	77,414	
Working Families	Peter Harckham	5,466	
Independence	Peter Harckham	939	
Total	Peter Harckham (incumbent)	83,819	51.9
Republican	Rob Astorino	69,867	
Conservative	Rob Astorino	7,276	
Rebuild Our State	Rob Astorino	545	
Total	Rob Astorino	77,688	48.1
Write-in		51	0.0
Total votes		161,588	100.0
Democratic hold			

=== 2018 ===
2018 New York State Senate election, District 40
Primary election
Party	Candidate	Votes	%
Democratic	Peter Harckham	11,647	53.5
Democratic	Robert Kesten	10,119	46.5
Write-in		0	0.0
Total votes		21,766	100.0
General election
Democratic	Peter Harckham	59,560	
Working Families	Peter Harckham	1,777	
Women's Equality	Peter Harckham	818	
Total	Peter Harckham	62,155	51.6
Republican	Terrence Murphy	49,730	
Conservative	Terrence Murphy	6,550	
Independence	Terrence Murphy	1,681	
Reform	Terrence Murphy	360	
Total	Terrence Murphy (incumbent)	58,321	48.4
Write-in		42	0.0
Total votes		120,518	100.0
Democratic gain from Republican			

=== 2016 ===
2016 New York State Senate election, District 40
Primary election
Party	Candidate	Votes	%
Democratic	Alison Boak	4,344	78.7
Democratic	Andrew Falk	1,179	21.3
Write-in		0	0.0
Total votes		5,523	100.0
General election
Republican	Terrence Murphy	68,393	
Conservative	Terrence Murphy	8,053	
Independence	Terrence Murphy	3,406	
Reform	Terrence Murphy	460	
Total	Terrence Murphy (incumbent)	80,312	57.7
Democratic	Alison Boak	55,706	
Working Families	Alison Boak	3,031	
Total	Alison Boak	58,737	42.2
Write-in		45	0.1
Total votes		139,094	100.0
Republican hold			

=== 2014 ===
2014 New York State Senate election, District 40
Primary election
Party	Candidate	Votes	%
Republican	Terrence Murphy	4,566	69.8
Republican	Robert Castelli	1,976	30.2
Write-in		0	0.0
Total votes		6,542	100.0
Green	Terrence Murphy	50	56.8
Green	Justin Wagner	28	31.8
Green	Joseph Phillips	10	11.4
Write-in		0	0.0
Total votes		88	100.0
General election
Republican	Terrence Murphy	37,210	
Conservative	Terrence Murphy	6,742	
Independence	Terrence Murphy	1,643	
Green	Terrence Murphy	675	
Stop Common Core	Terrence Murphy	614	
Total	Terrence Murphy	46,884	55.3
Democratic	Justin Wagner	34,327	
Working Families	Justin Wagner	3,638	
Total	Justin Wagner	37,875	44.6
Write-in		69	0.1
Total votes		84,828	100.0
Republican hold			

=== 2012 ===
2012 New York State Senate election, District 40
Primary election
Party	Candidate	Votes	%
Green	Justin Wagner	29	65.9
Green	Greg Ball (incumbent)	8	18.2
Green	Jeff Green	7	15.9
Write-in		0	0.0
Total votes		44	100.0
General election
Republican	Greg Ball	54,651	
Conservative	Greg Ball	7,597	
Independence	Greg Ball	2,743	
Total	Greg Ball (incumbent)	64,991	51.0
Democratic	Justin Wagner	57,364	
Working Families	Justin Wagner	3,516	
Green	Justin Wagner	1,445	
Total	Justin Wagner	62,325	49.0
Write-in		45	0.0
Total votes		127,316	100.0
Republican hold			

=== Federal results in District 40 ===
Year	Office	Results
2020	President	Biden 55.7 – 42.9%
2016	President	Clinton 51.7 – 44.8%
2012	President	Obama 50.6 – 48.1%
2012	Senate	Gillibrand 62.6 – 36.0%
