= Greg Ball (politician) =

American politician (born 1977)

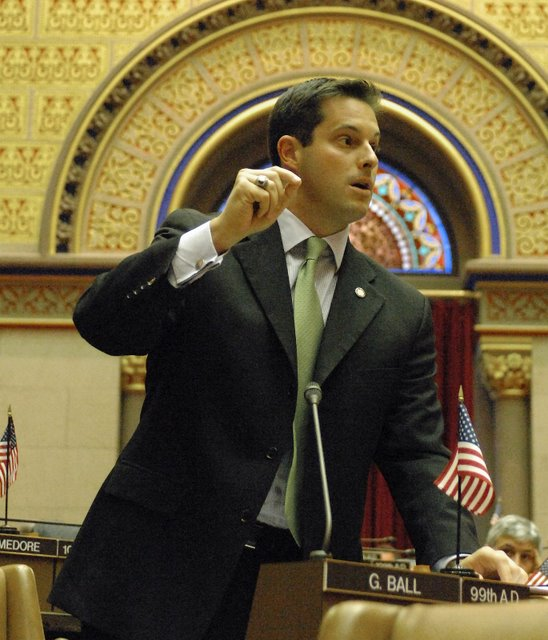

Member of the New York State Senate from the 40th district
- In office January 1, 2011 – December 31, 2014
- Preceded by: Vincent Leibell
- Succeeded by: Terrence Murphy
- Constituency: Putnam County and parts of Westchester County

Member of the New York State Assembly from the 99th district
- In office January 1, 2007 – December 31, 2010
- Preceded by: Willis Stephens
- Succeeded by: Steve Katz
- Constituency: Putnam County, Westchester County, Dutchess County

Personal details
- Born: September 16, 1977 (age 49) Pawling, New York, U.S.
- Party: Republican
- Education: United States Air Force Academy (BS)
- Occupation: Entrepreneur
- Website: Official website

Military service
- Branch/service: United States Air Force
- Years of service: 2001–2009
- Rank: Captain

Gregory R. Ball (born September 16, 1977) is a former American politician from 2006 to 2014, former active duty U.S. Air Force officer, and member of the New York State Senate and the New York State Assembly.

He gained attention for his unorthodox campaign tactics, such as dressing in a chicken suit to follow his opponent and making controversial statements. Ball focused on issues like illegal immigration and veterans' affairs during his time in office. He also took a strong stance against same-sex marriage, supported public funding for private school transportation, and opposed the publication of handgun permit holders' information. Additionally, Ball has been vocal in his opposition to medical marijuana and controversially advocated for the torture of a suspect in the Boston Marathon bombing.

After leaving office, he founded a consulting firm, Black Stone Global.

He is a resident of Fredericksburg, Texas.

== Early career and background ==
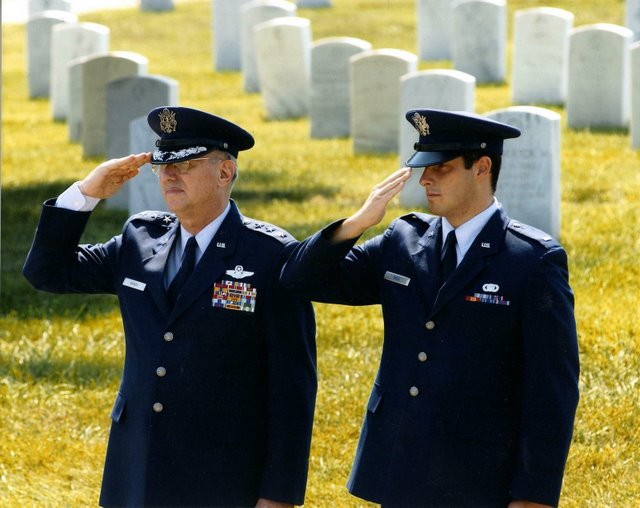
Air Force Captain Greg Ball graduated from the United States Air Force Academy.

Ball was born on September 16, 1977, in Pawling, New York, and grew up on Quaker Hill. In 1996, he was awarded the Falcon Foundation Scholarship and attended the Valley Forge Military Academy before receiving an appointment to the United States Air Force Academy. While at the United States Air Force Academy, Ball interned in the White House Drug Policy Office.

At the Air Force Academy, Ball received a Bachelor of Science in Government in 2001. He started a Masters in International Affairs at Georgetown University in 2004 and was a fellow at the Center for the Study of the Presidency from 2002 to 2003.

=== USAF service ===
Ball was commissioned as a Lieutenant in the United States Air Force and requested an assignment with the Air Force Academy's Diversity Recruitment Office, and was posted in Philadelphia for a one-year tour working as a Minority Admissions Officer. Ball was then assigned to the 11th Wing at Bolling Air Force Base in Washington, D.C., as protocol officer. The Ceremonies & Protocol office was responsible for planning, organizing and developing projects for the Secretary of the Air Force and the Air Force Chief of Staff, as well as coordinating honor guard burial services at Arlington National Cemetery.

During his time in the Ceremonies & Protocol Office, Ball was a Project Officer for a number of events. The largest may have been the 2003 Global Air Chief's Conference, the first since 1997, for which he rented a cruise ship for a welcome reception in Washington, D.C., for dignitaries attending the Global Air Chiefs Conference.

As a lieutenant, Ball was charged with directing National Hispanic Heritage Month in 2002, 2003, and 2004. He organized exhibits and demonstrations to recognize the contributions made by Hispanic countries and cultures, and hosted Alberto Gonzales, then White House Counsel, in 2003. In 2003, Ball was nominated as "Military Volunteer of the Year" for the 11th Wing. He was awarded an Air Force Achievement Medal for outstanding service by General John P. Jumper and was honorably discharged from active duty in January 2005, with the rank of captain.

=== Business career ===
Upon his separation from active duty, Ball was recruited by the Antioch, Illinois, based Exceed International, a commercial development corporation with a presence in India, Turkey and Tunisia. Placed in charge of the marketing department, he served as a team member with the Company President on a 38-company executive mission to an economic summit in New Delhi, which included representatives from companies such as Amex, Cargill, New York Life, Dow Chemical, General Electric, Bechtel, and Cognizant. Later, Exceed invested $11.1 million in India to expand operations. Construction began on six projects in Chennai, which included the ESPEE IT Park, and the Bascon Technology Park, which helped Exceed establish a foothold in India. The company also invested as a joint venture partner in mixed use residential projects such as a water treatment facility.

Eventually, Ball was elevated to Vice President of Exceed's Northeastern United States division and returned to New York. The Illinois based developer employs nearly 400 people in various fields such as project management, development, architecture, engineering, construction, government relations, finance, and technology. In 2006, Exceed proposed a $75 million urban renewal project for the village of Brewster which would generate some $2 million a year in tax revenue for the town. The village's Mayor noted that "All of the infrastructure work recently completed by defining our identity within the watershed has paid off. Brewster finds itself in a situation where people are eagerly interested in working with the village in partnership to see our village revitalized".

== Political career ==
In early 2005, Ball announced his candidacy for State Assembly as a Republican and stated he would attempt to unseat the incumbent Assemblyman Willis Stephens in a primary. Stephens' family had held the seat nearly continuously for eighty years: his grandfather, D. Mallory Stephens, represented the district from 1926 to 1952; his father, Willis Stephens Sr., held the seat from 1952 to 1982; and Stephens himself served from 1994 to 2006. Ball received over $110,000 in campaign contributions for the race. He was placed on the primary ballot by the signature of over 1800 petitioners.

In 2004, while living in D.C., Ball created a charity polo event for underprivileged youth known as the Courage Cup, which presented $10,000 to charities in 2005. The Courage Cup was also investigated by the Washington Post after allegations that Ball was diverting funds from the charity to his political campaigns. The Poughkeepsie Journal noted that Ball's political action committee made a donation to the Courage Cup charity for the use of the tent at the event. The group then solicited funds for Ball in the tent, an activity the assemblyman said was "perfectly legal and above-board.".

At times Ball's campaign was noted for its unorthodoxy. Ball himself dressed up in a chicken suit and followed around Stephens after the incumbent refused to debate him. On September 12, 2006, in the Republican Primary for New York's 99th district, Ball defeated Stephens in a landslide with 70.4% (5,165 votes) to 29.6% (2,176 votes) for Stephens, the lowest vote total for any incumbent running for reelection to the State Assembly that day. Stephens drew criticism when he refused to repudiate a letter about challenger Greg Ball which falsely claimed Mr. Ball had received a dishonorable discharge from the United States Air Force.

According to a 2006 interview, Ball's ultimate political ambition is to become the Governor of New York State.

== New York State Assembly (2007–2010) ==
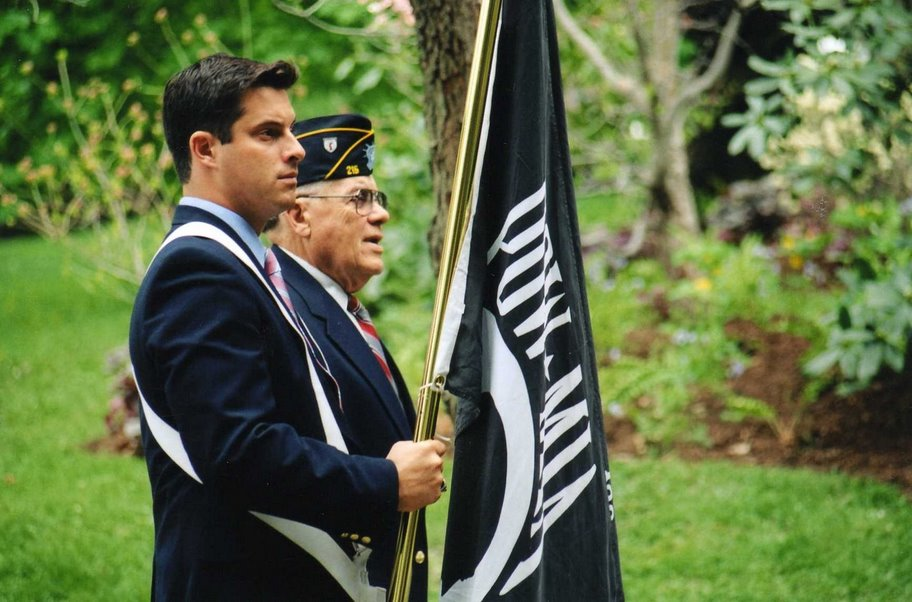
Ball participates in the 2007 Pawling Veterans Day parade carrying the flag of the POW-MIA.

Ball has stated that "since my election victory, we have made extraordinary progress by elevating the debate on tough issues like taxes, illegal immigration and dysfunction in Albany." He was sworn into office on January 8, 2007. The first time Ball rose to speak in the Assembly chamber, he called the legislature "dysfunctional", and withstood boos from his colleagues. The next day, Governor Spitzer called Ball to express support for his sentiments.

Ball stated that "It was not easy getting up as the new guy and standing up to tell a group of people what they don't want to hear" but his speech became so popular that soon dozens of reporters began calling, he appeared on Fox News, excerpts from the floor speech popped up on multiple political blogs, his campaign web site received so many visits that its server crashed, and, a YouTube video of his remarks was ranked 80th among new videos the day it was uploaded. Although the remarks were contentious, they echoed a fifty-six page study from the nonpartisan New York University School of Law's Brennan Center for Justice, which referred to the legislature as "the least deliberative and most dysfunctional in the nation".

As ranking member of the Veterans Affairs Committee, Ball announced legislation expanding the eligibility for veterans to receive tax exemption benefits, including the exemption of real property owned by certain disabled veterans from property taxation. Ball authored the bill that created the tuition remission program for veterans, offering them free tuition at both SUNY and CUNY undergraduate and graduate institutions. Governor Eliot Spitzer included the measure in his 2008 executive budget proposal, and the measure was kept funded in Governor David Paterson's version.

According to The Journal News, one key to Ball's success was that his campaign identified the concern local voters cared most about: illegal immigration. The New York Sun reported that Ball, who has called for some local prison and police officials to be trained by Immigration and Customs Enforcement to help deport illegal immigrants, defines himself as a moderate on the immigration issue. Ball made illegal immigration a focal point of his bid for office. In October 2007, he strongly criticized Governor Spitzer's plan to give driver's licenses to illegal immigrants. He was at the forefront of the opposition to the plan, and his Statewide petition to stop it led to the Assembly Minority Conference's decision to sue the Governor to stop the plan.

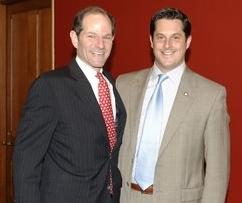
Former Governor Spitzer and Assemblyman Ball disagreed on a number of issues, but worked together on several reform packages.

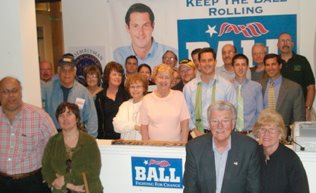
At his Pawling, New York, campaign headquarters, Assemblyman Ball and campaign volunteers gear up for his reelection bid in May 2008.

Ball has worked to promote businesses that hire legal immigrant laborers, and has begun to create a database for usage on his campaign website. His campaign headquarters in Pawling may have been targeted over the contentious issue, and was vandalized with swastikas in October 2006, although the person or persons responsible misspelled the word "Fascist" twice. An oft-quoted line from his campaign literature was that "Illegal Immigration is Illegal".

=== 2008 election ===
Ball was referred to as "one of the rising stars in the Republican Party" during speculation that he would run against freshman Congressman John Hall in 2008, although he later ruled out a challenge against Hall. In early May 2008, John Degnan, the former Mayor of Brewster, New York, announced he would be mounting a challenge to the freshman Assemblyman. In the September 9th, 2008 primary, Ball won the primary by a 3 to 1 margin amongst Republicans. He again faced Degnan, who had the Democratic nomination, in the general election, and was re-elected with 60% of the vote.

=== Feud with State Senator Vincent Leibell ===
In July 2010, State Senator Vincent Leibell blamed Ball for a raid of the Senator's home which was conducted by the Federal Bureau of Investigation. The Senator was later arrested, tried, and convicted on several counts of Federal corruption charges. Ball had often accused the Senator of using the office as his "personal piggy bank." The feud between Leibell and Ball dated back to the 2008 election, when Ball first accused the Senator of orchestrating a "smear campaign" against him.

On August 26, 2008, a local newspaper known as The Putnam Times published court documents surrounding the breakup between Ball and a Washington, D.C., woman in 2003. Ball blamed Leibell for hiring private investigators for the newspaper article, and for funding the campaign of his Democratic challenger, John Degnan. Ball stated both he and the woman both filed for orders of protection following the end of their relationship. In November 2003, both Ball and the woman asked the court to dismiss their complaints against each other, which was done. Ball told The Daily News that "It was just a heartfelt breakup where both parties jointly requested a 'cooling off' period, and the entire matter was mutually dismissed. My life is an open book, and always has been."

While The Putnam Times, a local paper incorrectly reported that Ball violated the order of protection by following the woman to Israel on July 20, News Channel 12, a regional network, pointed out that order of protection was filed six days earlier on July 14, and court records state Ball traveled to Israel on June 20. The Poughkeepsie Journal also later pointed out that there was never a criminal restraining order, and the documents printed by the Times was actually a temporary order of protection, which anyone can request.

Following the revelations that Ball's ex-girlfriend filed for an order of protection against him in 2003, on September 3, 2008, the Journal News reported that a former member of Ball's staff had accused him of sexually harassing her in a letter sent to Assembly Speaker Sheldon Silver detailing the incident. Perrault's accusations were later found to be fabrications and Ball was exonerated.

Initially, News 12 analyst Mike Edelman called the report "not credible," and some questioned the timing of the complaint, as the former staff member waited a year to write the letter until a few days before the primary election. The previous day, Ball had released e-mails from his former Chief of Staff, which stated that Perreault was ready to "go forward with a lawsuit and 'embellish' some of the details," calling the letter to Silver into question. Ball said the letter was part of a "smear campaign", and that the ex-Chief of Staff was a "mole" for State Senator Vincent Leibell, who was backing his primary opponent. Ball released a taped phone conversation between the ex-Chief of Staff and a local political candidate, where his former deputy stated he was working for "the senate" to "neuter" Ball. Although at first, the ex-Chief of Staff denied working for the senate to The Journal News, the next day, he admitted it in another article, but Senator Leibell denied any conspiracy.

The Assembly Ethics committee met in October 2008, reaching a 'not guilty' verdict and ruling that no harassment ever occurred, and unanimously voted to throw out the charges against Assemblyman Ball. The accuser, the 60-year-old Perrault, had been the target of multiple sexual harassment allegations at a prior job, where she was a supervisor. It was noted that Ball's accuser had herself settled four lawsuits for an undisclosed sum, at least three of which accused her of sexual harassment.

=== 2010 election, notable votes ===
In May 2009, Ball announced he was a candidate for Congress in New York's 19th congressional district. Ball drew some attention by raising more money than incumbent Congressman John Hall in the second quarter of 2009. On November 21, 2009, Ball abandoned his Congressional run and decided to run for State Senate in district 40, the seat formerly held by Vincent Leibell. In a letter to his supporters, Ball stated that the job of reforming Albany had not been completed, saying, "From property tax reform to corruption in government, the job I set to do in 2006 is still incomplete, and it can only be accomplished by continuing to tackle our nation's most dysfunctional legislature." Ball, who was opposed by the Republican Party operatives, defeated endorsed Republican candidate and Somers town supervisor Mary Beth Murphy in a primary election in September 2010. On November 2, 2010, Ball won election to the New York Senate from the 40th district by a 52%–48% margin over Mike Kaplowitz, also from Somers.

=== Political positions ===
On June 24, 2011, Ball voted against allowing same-sex marriage in New York during a senate roll-call vote on the Marriage Equality Act, which narrowly passed 33-29 and legalized marriages performed in the state regardless of the genders involved in the union. In a CNN interview, Ball said he did not think the bill went far enough in extending religious protections for "individuals and businesses with religious objections" to marriage equality for same-sex couples.

Ball opposes drilling in the Marcellus Formation and in particular the use of hydraulic fracturing in the process. He has taken several tours of Pennsylvania with Josh Fox, the director of Gasland.

Ball supported the temporary two-month extension of the Social Security payroll tax relief, calling out incumbent Representative Nan Hayworth for voting against the bill using class-related rhetoric, accusing Hayworth of being out of touch with her constituents.

In 2012, Ball has expressed strong support for the use of public funds to transport private school students and is currently trying to increase the distance for these children that the public schools would be responsible for.

Ball spoke out against publishing the names and addresses of handgun permit holders, insulting the editors of The Journal News, and accusing them of privacy violation.

Gregory Ball has taken a strong, public stance against medical marijuana since bills regarding the topic have come before the NYS senate after passing through the Assembly. After Just Say Now activists contacted their representatives during the week of April 1, 2013, Senator Gregory Ball tweeted, "Receiving emails, calls on "Medical" Marijuana...let me be clear: Marijuana is NOT medicine. Period. Next topic..."

In April 2013, Ball argued on Twitter that Dzhokhar Tsarnaev, one of the perpetrators of the Boston Marathon bombing, should be tortured in order to obtain information on any possible attacks in the future. He subsequently got into a heated on-air exchange with CNN host Piers Morgan when asked to defend his Twitter post.

== Retirement from politics ==
In May 2014, Ball announced that he would not seek reelection, opting instead to return to the private sector. He was replaced by Yorktown town councilman Terrence Murphy on January 1, 2015. After leaving office, Ball founded Black Stone Global, a consulting firm.

Investigations into misappropriated campaign funds were taking place prior to Ball’s announcement that he would not be seeking re-election. Filings received after the deadline at the New York State Board of Elections showed funds spent on “campaign-related travel” that occurred after his announcement to not seek a second term. Over $8,000 was allocated to Goldfishbrain LLC, a firm acquired by Black Stone Global in January 2015. The investigation also looked into payments on a car loan and retail stores. Josef Bachmeier, chief marketing officer for Black Stone Global, denied any improper use of funds in relation to the two companies.

New York State Assembly
Preceded by Willis Stephens	New York State Assembly; 99th district 2007–2010	Succeeded by Steve Katz
New York State Senate
Preceded by Vincent Leibell	New York State Senate; 40th district 2011–2015	Succeeded by Terrence Murphy
