= List of 2008 United States presidential electors =

This is a list of electors (members of the Electoral College) who cast ballots to elect the President of the United States and Vice President of the United States in the 2008 presidential election. There are 538 electors from the 50 states and the District of Columbia. While every state except Nebraska and Maine chooses the electors by statewide vote, many states require that one elector be designated for each congressional district. Except where otherwise noted, such designations refer to the elector's residence in that district rather than election by the voters of the district.

== Alabama ==
Electors: 9, pledged to John McCain and Sarah Palin:

- Les Barnett of Mobile, elector for Alabama's 1st congressional district.
- Will Sellers of Montgomery, elector for Alabama's 2nd congressional district.
- Ralph (Al) Blythe of Alexander City, Alabama, elector for Alabama's 3rd congressional district.
- W. Jack Stiefel of Rainsville, elector for Alabama's 4th congressional district.
- J. Elbert Peters of Huntsville, elector for Alabama's 5th congressional district.
- Matthew Fridy of Montevallo, elector for Alabama's 6th congressional district.
- Robert (Bob) A. Cusanelli of Carrollton, elector for Alabama's 7th congressional district.
- Cam Ward of Alabaster, at-large elector.
- James (Jim) Eldon Wilson of Montgomery, at-large elector.

== Alaska ==
Electors: 3, pledged to John McCain and Sarah Palin:

- Roy Burkhart of Willow, at-large elector.
- Hope Nelson of Anchorage, at-large elector.
- Robert Brodie of Kodiak, at-large elector.

== Arizona ==
Electors: 10, pledged to John McCain and Sarah Palin:

- Bruce Ash of Tucson, elector for Arizona's 1st congressional district.
- Kurt Davis of Flagstaff, elector for Arizona's 2nd congressional district.
- Wes Gullett of Phoenix, elector for Arizona's 3rd congressional district.
- Sharon Harper of Phoenix, elector for Arizona's 4th congressional district.
- Jack Londen of Phoenix, elector for Arizona's 5th congressional district.
- Beverly Lockett Miller of Sedona, elector for Arizona's 6th congressional district.
- Lee Miller of Phoenix, elector for Arizona's 7th congressional district.
- Bettina Nava of Phoenix, elector for Arizona's 8th congressional district.
- Randy Pullen of Phoenix, at-large elector.
- Michael Rappoport of Scottsdale, at-large elector.

== Arkansas ==
Electors: 6, pledged to John McCain and Sarah Palin:

- Jim Burnett of Clinton, elector for Arkansas's 2nd congressional district.
- Reta Hamilton of Bella Vista, elector for Arkansas's 3rd congressional district.
- Rose Bryant Jones of Little Rock, elector for Arkansas's 1st congressional district.
- Phyllis Kincannon of Maumelle, elector for Arkansas's 2nd congressional district.
- Steve Lux of Pine Bluff, elector for Arkansas's 4th congressional district.
- Kermit Parks of El Dorado, elector for Arkansas's 4th congressional district.

== California ==
Electors: 55, pledged to Barack Obama and Joe Biden:

- Ian Robert Blue of Ukiah, elector for California's 1st congressional district.
- Mark H. Cibula of Igo, elector for California's 2nd congressional district.
- Richard Allen Hundrieser of Sacramento, elector for California's 3rd congressional district.
- Lawrence Steven Du Bois of Loomis, elector for California's 4th congressional district.
- Mark Friedman of Sacramento, elector for California's 5th congressional district.
- Mary W. Hubert of San Rafael, elector for California's 6th congressional district.
- Fred D. Jackson of Richmond, elector for California's 7th congressional district.
- LeRoy King of San Francisco, elector for California's 8th congressional district.
- Roberta C. Brooks of Berkeley, elector for California's 9th congressional district.
- Audrey Gordon of Orinda, elector for California's 10th congressional district.
- Michael McNerney of Pleasanton, elector for California's 11th congressional district.
- Nancy Jean Parrish of San Francisco, elector for California's 12th congressional district.
- James Paul Farley of Hayward, elector for California's 13th congressional district.
- John Freidenrich of Atherton, elector for California's 14th congressional district.
- Jeremy Seiji Nishihara of San Jose, elector for California's 15th congressional district.
- Jaime A. Alvarado of San Jose, elector for California's 16th congressional district.
- Vinz J. Koller of Carmel-by-the-Sea, elector for California's 17th congressional district.
- Gregory Ray Olzack of Atwater, elector for California's 18th congressional district.
- David A. Sanchez of Rancho Mirage, elector for California's 19th congressional district.
- Larry Sheingold of Sacramento, elector for California's 20th congressional district.
- Stephen Allen Smith of Fresno, elector for California's 21st congressional district.
- Mark A. Macarro of Temecula, elector for California's 22nd congressional district.
- Nathan Eric Brostrom of Berkeley, elector for California's 23rd congressional district.
- Robert M. "Bob" Handy of Santa Barbara, elector for California's 24th congressional district.
- Robert D. Conaway of Hinkley, elector for California's 25th congressional district.
- Greg Warner of Rancho Cucamonga, elector for California's 26th congressional district.
- Lane Sherman of Northridge, elector for California's 27th congressional district.
- Ilene Haber of Sherman Oaks, elector for California's 28th congressional district.
- Kenneth Sulzer of Los Angeles, elector for California's 29th congressional district.
- Sanford Weiner of Los Angeles, elector for California's 30th congressional district.
- Ana Delgado Mascarenas of Los Angeles, elector for California's 31st congressional district.
- Joe Perez of Santa Monica, elector for California's 32nd congressional district.
- Gwen Moore of Los Angeles, elector for California's 33rd congressional district.
- Anthony Rendon of Los Angeles, elector for California's 34th congressional district.
- Karen D. Waters of Inglewood, elector for California's 35th congressional district.
- Kelley Schnaitter Willis of Venice, elector for California's 36th congressional district.
- Silissa Uriarte-Smith of Long Beach, elector for California's 37th congressional district.
- Norma Judith Torres of Pomona, elector for California's 38th congressional district.
- Alma Marquez of South Gate, elector for California's 39th congressional district.
- Ray L. Cordova of Garden Grove, elector for California's 40th congressional district.
- Patrick Kelly Kahler of Highland, elector for California's 41st congressional district.
- Aaruni Kumar Thakur of Fullerton, elector for California's 42nd congressional district.
- Joe Baca Jr. of Rialto, elector for California's 43rd congressional district.
- Juadina Stallings of Corona, elector for California's 44th congressional district.
- Betty McMillion of Beaumont, elector for California's 45th congressional district.
- William F. Gusta Ayer of Fountain Valley, elector for California's 46th congressional district.
- Gregory Howes Willenborg of Santa Ana, elector for California's 47th congressional district.
- James L. Yedor of Santa Anna, elector for California's 48th congressional district.
- Bobby Gene Glaser of San Diego, elector for California's 49th congressional district.
- Mary Elizabeth Keadle of Rancho Santa Fe, elector for California's 50th congressional district.
- Frank G. Salazar of Imperial, elector for California's 51st congressional district.
- Christine Raye Young of Oceanside, elector for California's 52nd congressional district.
- Sid Voorakkara of San Diego, elector for California's 53rd congressional district.
- Aleita Huguenin of Rancho Murieta, at-large elector.
- Lou Paulson of Walnut Creek, at-large elector.

== Colorado ==
Electors: 9, pledged to Barack Obama and Joe Biden:

- Wellington Webb of Denver, elector for Colorado's 1st congressional district.
- Terry Phillips of Louisville, elector for Colorado's 2nd congressional district.
- Camilla Auger of Aspen, elector for Colorado's 3rd congressional district.
- Pam Shaddock of Greeley, elector for Colorado's 4th congressional district.
- Jennifer Trujillo-Sanchez of Colorado Springs, elector for Colorado's 5th congressional district.
- Don Strickland of Centennial, elector for Colorado's 6th congressional district.
- Ann Knollman of Arvada, elector for Colorado's 7th congressional district.
- Polly Baca of Denver, at-large elector.
- Margaret Atencio of Denver, at-large elector.

== Connecticut ==
Electors: 7, pledged to Barack Obama and Joe Biden:

- Shirley W. Steinmetz of Wethersfield, at-large elector.
- Nicholas Paindiris of Glastonbury, at-large elector.
- Andrea Jackson-Brooks of New Haven, at-large elector.
- Jim Ezzes of Westport, at-large elector.
- Lorraine McQueen of Wolcott, at-large elector.
- Deborah McFadden of Wilton, at-large elector.
- Ken Delacruz of North Stonington, at-large elector.

== Delaware ==
Electors: 3, pledged to Barack Obama and Joe Biden:

- James Johnson of Wilmington, at-large elector.
- Ted Kaufman of Wilmington, at-large elector.
- Harriet Smith Windsor of Dover, at-large elector.

== District of Columbia ==
Electors: 3, pledged to Barack Obama and Joe Biden:

- Muriel Bowser, at-large elector.
- Jerry S. Cooper, at-large elector.
- Vincent C. Gray, at-large elector.

== Florida ==
Electors: 27, pledged to Barack Obama and Joe Biden

- Chip Arndt of Miami Beach, FL, at-large elector.
- T. Wayne Bailey of DeLand, FL, at-large elector.
- Freddy Balsera of Coral Gables, FL, at-large elector.
- Terrie Brady of Jacksonville, FL, at-large elector.
- Karl Flagg of Palatka, FL, at-large elector.
- Joe Gibbons of Hallandale Beach, FL, at-large elector.
- Janet Goen of Tarpon Springs, FL, at-large elector.
- James Golden of Bradenton, FL, at-large elector.
- Chris Hand of Jacksonville, FL, at-large elector.
- Marlon Hill of Miami, FL, at-large elector.
- Tony Hill of Jacksonville, FL, at-large elector.
- Joan Joseph of Jupiter, FL, at-large elector.
- Allan J. Katz of Tallahassee, FL, at-large elector.
- Gena Keebler of Saint Petersburg, FL, at-large elector.
- Joan Lane of DeLand, FL, at-large elector.
- Caren Lobo of Sarasota, FL, at-large elector.
- Rick Minor of Tallahassee, FL, at-large elector.
- Jared Moskowitz of Parkland, FL, at-large elector.
- Angela Rodante of Tampa, FL, at-large elector.
- Frank Sanchez of Tampa, FL, at-large elector.
- Juanita Scott of Pensacola, FL, at-large elector.
- Geraldine Thompson of Orlando, FL, at-large elector.
- Karen Thurman of Dunnellon, FL, at-large elector.
- Carmen Torres of Orlando, FL, at-large elector.
- Kirk Wagar of Miami, FL, at-large elector
- Enoch Williams of Heathrow, FL, at-large elector.
- Frederica Wilson of Miami, FL, at-large elector.

== Georgia ==
Electors: 15, pledged to John McCain and Sarah Palin:

- Esther Clark of Buford, GA, at-large elector.
- Dennis Coxwell of Warrenton, GA, at-large elector.
- Norma Edenfield of Atlanta, GA, at-large elector.
- Randy Evans of Atlanta, GA, at-large elector.
- Sue Everhart of Atlanta, GA, at-large elector.
- Leigh Ann Gillis of Atlanta, GA, at-large elector.
- Judy Goddard of Warner Robins, GA, at-large elector.
- Linda Herren of Atlanta, GA, at-large elector.
- Rufus Montgomery of Atlanta, GA, at-large elector.
- Clint Murphy of Savannah, GA, at-large elector.
- Sunny Park of Atlanta, GA, at-large elector.
- Alec Poitevint of Bainbridge, GA, at-large elector.
- John Sours of Smyrna, GA, at-large elector.
- Allan Vigil of McDonough, GA, at-large elector.
- John White of Decatur, GA, at-large elector.

== Hawaii ==
Electors: 4, pledged to Barack Obama and Joe Biden:

- Joy Kobashigawa Lewis of Honolulu, HI, at-large elector.
- Marie Dolores Strazar of Hilo, HI, at-large elector.
- Amefil Agbayani of Honolulu, HI, at-large elector.
- Frances K. Kagawa of Honolulu, HI, at-large elector.

== Idaho ==
Electors: 4, pledged to John McCain and Sarah Palin:

- Darlene Bramon of Hailey, ID, at-large elector.
- Ben Doty of Boise, ID, at-large elector.
- John Erickson of Lewisville, ID, at-large elector.
- Melinda Smyser of Parma, ID, at-large elector.

== Illinois ==
Electors: 21, pledged to Barack Obama and Joe Biden:

- Constance A. Howard of Chicago, IL, elector for Illinois's 1st congressional district
- Carrie Austin of Chicago, IL, elector for Illinois's 2nd congressional district
- Andrew Madigan, of Chicago, IL, elector for Illinois's 3rd congressional district, (replaced Shirley R. Madigan)
- Ricardo Muñoz of Chicago, IL, elector for Illinois's 4th congressional district
- James DeLeo of Chicago, IL, elector for Illinois's 5th congressional district
- Marge Friedman of Park Forest, IL, elector for Illinois's 6th congressional district
- Vera Davis of Chicago, IL, elector for Illinois's 7th congressional district
- Nancy Shepardson of Deer Park, IL, elector for Illinois's 8th congressional district
- William A. Marovitz of Chicago, IL, elector for Illinois's 9th congressional district
- Lauren Beth Gash of Highland Park, IL, elector for Illinois's 10th congressional district
- Debbie Halvorson of Crete, IL, elector for Illinois's 11th congressional district
- Molly McKenzie of Belleville, IL, elector for Illinois's 12th congressional district
- Julia Kennedy Beckman of Darien, IL, elector for Illinois's 13th congressional district
- Mark Guethle of North Aurora, IL, elector for Illinois's 14th congressional district
- Lynn Foster of Danville, IL, elector for Illinois's 15th congressional district
- John M. Nelson of Rockford, IL, elector for Illinois's 16th congressional district
- Mary Boland of East Moline, IL, elector for Illinois's 17th congressional district
- Shirley McCombs of Petersburg, IL, elector for Illinois's 18th congressional district
- Don Johnston of Moline, IL, elector for Illinois's 19th congressional district
- Barbara Flynn Currie of Chicago, IL, at-large elector
- John R. Daley, of Chicago, IL, at-large elector

== Indiana ==
Electors: 11, pledged to Barack Obama and Joe Biden:

- Jeffrey L. Chidester of Valparaiso, IN, at-large elector.
- Owen "Butch" Morgan of South Bend, IN, at-large elector.
- Michelle Boxell of Warsaw, IN, at-large elector.
- Charlotte Martin of Indianapolis, IN, at-large elector.
- Jerry J. Lux of Shelbyville, IN, at-large elector.
- Connie Southworth of Salamonia, IN, at-large elector.
- Alan P. Hogan of Indianapolis, IN, at-large elector.
- Myrna E. Brown of Vincennes, IN, at-large elector.
- Clarence Benjamin Leatherbury of Salem, IN, at-large elector.
- Daniel J. Parker of Indianapolis, IN, at-large elector.
- Cordelia Lewis Burks of Indianapolis, IN, at-large elector.

== Iowa ==
Electors: 7, pledged to Barack Obama and Joe Biden:

- Elwood Thompson of Waterloo, IA, elector for Iowa's 1st congressional district.
- Slayton Thompson of Cedar Rapids, IA, elector for Iowa's 2nd congressional district.
- Kathleen O'Leary of Des Moines, IA, elector for Iowa's 3rd congressional district.
- Jon Heitland of Iowa Falls, IA, elector for Iowa's 4th congressional district.
- Dennis Ryan of Onawa, IA, elector for Iowa's 5th congressional district.
- Joe Judge of Albia, IA, at-large elector.
- Audrey Linville of Davenport, IA, at-large elector.

== Kansas ==
Electors: 6, pledged to John McCain and Sarah Palin:

- Tom Arpke of Salina, KS, at-large elector.
- Jeff Colyer of Overland Park, KS, at-large elector.
- David Kensinger of Topeka, KS, at-large elector.
- Kris Kobach of Piper, KS, at-large elector.
- Mike Pompeo of Wichita, KS, at-large elector.
- Helen Van Etten of Topeka, KS, at-large elector.

== Kentucky ==
Electors: 8, pledged to John McCain and Sarah Palin:

- James Henry Snider of Franklin, KY, elector for Kentucky's 1st congressional district.
- Walter Arnold Baker of Glasgow, KY, elector for Kentucky's 2nd congressional district.
- Edna M. Fulkerson of Louisville, KY, elector for Kentucky's 3rd congressional district.
- Amy B. Towles of Fort Thomas, KY, elector for Kentucky's 4th congressional district
- Nancy Mitchell of Corbin, KY, elector for Kentucky's 5th congressional district.
- Don Ball of Lexington, KY, elector for Kentucky's 6th congressional district.
- Robert Gable of Frankfort, KY, at-large elector.
- Elizabeth G. Thomas of Flemingsburg, KY, at-large elector.

== Louisiana ==
Electors: 9, pledged to John McCain and Sarah Palin:

- Lynn E. Skidmore of Metairie, LA, elector for Louisiana's 1st congressional district.
- Joe Lavigne of New Orleans, LA, elector for Louisiana's 2nd congressional district.
- Gordon J. Giles of Houma, LA, elector for Louisiana's 3rd congressional district. He replaced Billy Nungesser of Port Sulphur, who was absent due to illness.
- Alan Seabaugh of Shreveport, LA, elector for Louisiana's 4th congressional district.
- Karen Haymon of Alexandria, LA, elector for Louisiana's 5th congressional district.
- Charles Davis of Baton Rouge, LA, elector for Louisiana's 6th congressional district.
- Charlie Buckels of Lafayette, LA, elector for Louisiana's 7th congressional district.
- Dianne Christopher of New Roads, LA, at-large elector.
- Roger F. Villere Jr. of Metairie, LA, at-large elector.

== Maine ==
Electors: 4, pledged to Barack Obama and Joe Biden:

- Jill Duson of Portland, Maine, elector for Maine's 1st congressional district.
- Samuel Shapiro of Waterville, Maine, elector for Maine's 2nd congressional district.
- Robert O'Brien of Peaks Island, Maine, at-large elector.
- Tracie Reed of Portland, Maine, at-large elector.

== Maryland ==
Electors: 10, pledged to Barack Obama and Joe Biden:

- Gene Ransom of Chester, MD, at-large elector.
- Delores Kelley of Baltimore, MD, at-large elector.
- Guy Guzzone of Columbia, MD, at-large elector.
- Nathaniel Exum of Landover, MD, at-large elector.
- Christopher Reynolds of Port Republic, MD, at-large elector.
- A.G. Bobby Fouche of Hagerstown, MD, at-large elector.
- Elizabeth Bobo of Columbia, MD, at-large elector.
- Michael Barnes of Chevy Chase, MD, at-large elector.
- Susan Lee of Bethesda, MD, at-large elector.
- Rainier Harvey of Woodlawn, at-large elector.

== Massachusetts ==
Electors: 12, pledged to Barack Obama and Joe Biden:

- Samuel Poulten of Chelmsford, MA, at-large elector.
- Melvin Poindexter of Watertown, MA, at-large elector.
- Jason Whittet of Wellesley, MA, at-large elector.
- Joseph H. Kaplan of Mansfield, MA, at-large elector.
- John P. Brissette of Worcester, MA, at-large elector.
- Raymond A. Jordan of Springfield, MA, at-large elector.
- Patricia Marcus of Greenfield, MA, at-large elector.
- Brenda Brathwaite of Dorchester, MA, at-large elector.
- Carol Pacheco of Dedham, MA, at-large elector.
- Mary Anne Dube of Worcester, MA, at-large elector.
- Faye Morrison of Ayer, MA, at-large elector.
- Corinne Wingard of Agawam, MA, at-large elector.

== Michigan ==
Electors: 17, pledged to Barack Obama and Joe Biden:

- Brenda Abbey, Jackson
- Dallas Dean, Grant
- Ida DeHaas, Belmont
- Ron Gettelfinger, Canton
- James Hoffa, Troy
- Kenneth Paul Jenkins, Macomb Twp.
- Harry Kalogerakos, Grosse Pointe Farms
- Jessica Mistak, Redford
- Arturo Reyes, Grand Blanc
- Griffin Rivers, Lansing
- Gary Shepherd, Saginaw
- Roger Short, Detroit
- Arthur Shy, Dearborn Heights
- Richard West, Cheboygan
- Whitney Randall Wolcott, Gobles
- David Woodward, Royal Oak
- Charlene Yarbrough, Lathrup Village

== Minnesota ==
Electors: 10, pledged to Barack Obama and Joe Biden:

- Arthur A. Anderson of Albert Lea
- Jim Gremmels of Glenwood
- David W. Lee of Minneapolis
- Al Patton of Sartell
- Joan M. Wittman of St. Paul
- William J. Davis of Brooklyn Park
- Benjamin F. Gross of Eagan
- Matt Little of Maplewood
- Jackie Stevenson of Minnetonka
- Susan Kay Moravec of Shakopee

(Donyta J. Wright of Hibbing was originally one of those elected, but when she did not appear for the ceremony, she was replaced by alternate Moravec by a drawing.)

== Mississippi ==
Electors: 6, pledged to John McCain and Sarah Palin:

- Jim Barksdale
- Barry Bridgforth
- Fred Carl Jr.
- Bobby Chain, former mayor of Hattiesburg
- Charles Doty
- Victor Mavar

== Missouri ==
Electors: 11, pledged to John McCain and Sarah Palin:

- Willis Corbett of St. Louis, MO, elector for Missouri's 1st congressional district.
- Scott Dickenson of Eureka, MO, elector for Missouri's 2nd congressional district.
- Robert Haul of St. Louis, MO, elector for Missouri's 3rd congressional district.
- Ronny Margason of Jefferson City, MO, elector for Missouri's 4th congressional district.
- Cathy Owens of Kansas City, MO, elector for Missouri's 5th congressional district.
- Ron Muck of Kansas City, MO, elector for Missouri's 6th congressional district.
- Gene Hall of Anderson, MO, elector for Missouri's 7th congressional district.
- R. Mellene Schudy of Mountain Grove, MO, elector for Missouri's 8th congressional district.
- Nadine Thurman of Clarence, MO, elector for Missouri's 9th congressional district.
- Paul Nahon of Springfield, MO, at-large elector.
- Jerry Dowell of Columbia, MO, at-large elector.

== Montana ==
Electors: 3, pledged to John McCain and Sarah Palin:

- Thelma Baker of Missoula, MT, at-large elector.
- John Brenden of Scobey, MT, at-large elector.
- Errol Galt of Martinsdale, MT, at-large elector.

== Nebraska ==
Nebraska is not a winner take-all state. Nebraska is the first state in the modern era to have a split electoral decision.

Electors: 4, pledged to John McCain and Sarah Palin; 2 at large, 1 for each of the 1st and 3rd Congressional districts. 1 pledged to Barack Obama and Joe Biden:

- Charles Thone of Lincoln, NE, elector for Nebraska's 1st congressional district pledged to John McCain and Sarah Palin.
- William Forsee of Bellevue, NE, elector for Nebraska's 2nd congressional district pledged to Barack Obama and Joe Biden.
- D. Neal Smith of Gering, NE, elector for Nebraska's 3rd congressional district pledged to John McCain and Sarah Palin.
- Norman Riffel of Springfield, NE, at-large elector pledged to John McCain and Sarah Palin.
- Patricia Dorwart of Sidney, NE, at-large elector pledged to John McCain and Sarah Palin.

== Nevada ==
Electors: 5, pledged to Barack Obama and Joe Biden:

- Maggie Carlton of Las Vegas, NV.
- Tahis Castro of Reno, NV.
- Ruby Duncan of Las Vegas, NV.
- Ron Hibble of Pioche, NV.
- Theresa Navarro of Reno, NV.

== New Hampshire ==
Electors: 4, pledged to Barack Obama and Joe Biden:

- Martha Fuller Clark of Portsmouth, NH, at-large elector.
- Gaeten DiGangi of Merrimack, NH, at-large elector.
- Edgar "Ned" Helms of Concord, NH, at-large elector.
- Kathleen N. Sullivan of Manchester, NH, at-large elector.

== New Jersey ==
Electors: 15, pledged to Barack Obama and Joe Biden:

- Jose Colon
- William Fontanez
- Gina Genovese
- Wilma Grey
- Kevin G. Halpern
- Victor J. Herlinsky Jr.
- Stacy Lubrecht
- Salaheddin Mustafa
- Peter D. Nichols
- William W. Northgrave
- Ken Saunders
- Ginger Gold Schnitzer
- Carl E. Styles
- Shavonda E. Sumter
- Stephen S. Weinstein

== New Mexico ==
Electors: 5, pledged to Barack Obama and Joe Biden:

- Brian S. Colon of Albuquerque, NM
- Annadelle Sanchez of Espanola, NM
- Tom Buckner, of Rio Rancho, NM
- Christy French, of Las Cruces, NM
- Alvin Warren, of Espanola, NM

== New York ==
Electors: 31, pledged to Barack Obama and Joe Biden:

- Velda Jeffrey
- June F. O'Neill
- Dennis Mehiel
- David Paterson
- Andrew Cuomo
- Thomas DiNapoli
- Sheldon Silver
- Malcolm Smith
- Maria Luna
- Robert Master
- Pamela Green-Perkins
- Helen D. Foster
- Jon Cooper
- Hakeem Jeffries
- Richard Fife
- Deborah A. Slott
- Terrence Yang
- George Arthur
- George Gresham
- Alan Van Capelle
- Inez Dickens
- Suzy Ballantyne
- Alan Lubin
- Bethaida González
- Christine Quinn
- Bill Thompson
- Stuart Applebaum
- Maritza Davila
- Ivan Young
- Barbara Fiala
- Frank A. Bolz, III

== North Carolina ==
Electors: 15, pledged to Barack Obama and Joe Biden:

- Janice Cole, elector for North Carolina's 1st congressional district.
- Louise Sewell, elector for North Carolina's 2nd congressional district.
- Virginia Tillett, elector for North Carolina's 3rd congressional district.
- Linda Gunter, elector for North Carolina's 4th congressional district.
- Timothy Futrelle, elector for North Carolina's 5th congressional district.
- Wayne Abraham, elector for North Carolina's 6th congressional district.
- Armin J. Ancis, elector for North Carolina's 7th congressional district.
- Wendy Wood, elector for North Carolina's 8th congressional district.
- Michael Cognac, elector for North Carolina's 9th congressional district.
- Dan W. DeHart, elector for North Carolina's 10th congressional district.
- Harley Caldwell, elector for North Carolina's 11th congressional district.
- Samuel Spencer, IV, elector for North Carolina's 12th congressional district.
- Patricia Hawkins, elector for North Carolina's 13th congressional district.
- David Crawford, at-large elector.
- Kara Hollingsworth, at-large elector.

== North Dakota ==
Electors: 3, pledged to John McCain and Sarah Palin:

- Theresa Tokach of Mandan, ND, at-large elector (replaced Richard Elkin of Bismarck, ND)
- Susan Wefald of Bismarck, ND, at-large elector.
- Cleo Thompson of Page, ND, at-large elector.

== Ohio ==
Electors: 20, pledged to Barack Obama and Joe Biden:

- Catherine Barret
- Barbara Tuckerman
- Wade Kapszukiewicz
- Tamela Lee
- Renee Cafaro
- Victoria Wells Wulsin
- Craig Brown
- Jimmy Cotner
- Janet Carson
- Bruce Johnson
- Nannette Whaley
- Martha Jane Brooks
- Eugene Miller
- Fran Alberty
- Chris Redfern
- John Kostyo
- Kelly Gillis
- Charleta Tavares
- Michael Todd
- Ted Strickland

== Oklahoma ==
Electors: 7, pledged to John McCain and Sarah Palin:

- Virginia Chrisco
- Gail Stice
- Pete Katzdorn
- Robert Cleveland
- Mary Phyllis Gorman
- Bunny Chambers
- Diane Murphy Gunther

== Oregon ==
Electors: 7, pledged to Barack Obama and Joe Biden:

- Michael J. Bohan
- Shirley A. Cairns
- R.P. Joe Smith
- John C. McColgan
- Meredith Wood Smith
- Frank James Dixon
- Bernard Gorter

== Pennsylvania ==
Electors: 21, pledged to Barack Obama and Joe Biden:

- Lynne Abraham Philadelphia County
- Christopher Lewis Chester County
- John S. Brenner York County
- Valerie McDonald-Roberts Allegheny County
- Eileen Connell Dauphin County
- Tom McMahon Berks County
- Kathi Cozzone Chester County
- Robert Mellow Lackawanna County
- John Fetterman Allegheny County
- Michael Nutter Philadelphia County
- William George Cumberland County
- Corey D. O'Brien Lackawanna County
- Patrick B. Gillespie Delaware County
- Josh Shapiro Montgomery County
- Rick Gray Lancaster County
- Jack Wagner Allegheny County
- Franco Harris Allegheny County
- Michael J. Washo Lackawanna County
- George Hartwick Dauphin County
- Wendell Young, IV Montgomery County
- Daylin Leach Montgomery County

== Rhode Island ==
Electors: 4, pledged to Barack Obama and Joe Biden:

- Maryellen Goodwin of Providence, RI, at-large elector.
- Charlene Lima of Cranston, RI, at-large elector.
- John J. McConnell Jr. of Providence, RI, at-large elector.
- Mark Weiner of Cranston, RI, at-large elector.

== South Carolina ==
Electors: 8, pledged to John McCain and Sarah Palin:

- Wayland Moody of Summerville, SC, elector for South Carolina's 1st congressional district.
- Benny Kinlaw of Barnwell, SC, elector for South Carolina's 2nd congressional district.
- Susan Aiken of Anderson, SC, elector for South Carolina's 3rd congressional district.
- Betty Sheppard Poe of Greenville, SC, elector for South Carolina's 4th congressional district.
- Rebecca W. Delleney of Chester, SC, elector for South Carolina's 5th congressional district.
- Shelby M. Phillips of Hanahan, SC, elector for South Carolina's 6th congressional district.
- Katon Dawson of Columbia, SC, at-large elector.
- Patrick Haddon of Greenville, SC, at-large elector.

== South Dakota ==
Electors: 3, pledged to John McCain and Sarah Palin:

- Mike Rounds of Pierre, SD, at-large elector.
- Dennis Daugaard of Garretson, SD, at-large elector.
- Larry Long of Pierre, SD, at-large elector.

== Tennessee ==
Electors: 11, pledged to John McCain and Sarah Palin:

- Sara Sellers, elector for Tennessee's 1st congressional district
- Jim Haslam, II, elector for Tennessee's 2nd congressional district
- J. Wayne Cropp, elector for Tennessee's 3rd congressional district
- Lisa Wheeler, elector for Tennessee's 4th congressional district
- Beth Campbell, elector for Tennessee's 5th congressional district
- Albert McCall, elector for Tennessee's 6th congressional district
- Shirley Curry, elector for Tennessee's 7th congressional district
- Marilucile Counce, elector for Tennessee's 8th congressional district
- Colin Richmond, elector for Tennessee's 9th congressional district
- Winfield Dunn, at-large elector
- Chrystal Horne, at-large elector

== Texas ==
Electors: 34, pledged to John McCain and Sarah Palin:

- Marcia Daughtrey of Tyler, Texas, elector for Texas's 1st congressional district.
- Virgil Vickery of Spring, Texas, elector for Texas's 2nd congressional district.
- Charlie O'Reilly of Plano, Texas, elector for Texas's 3rd congressional district.
- Brenda Zielke of Rockwall, Texas, elector for Texas's 4th congressional district.
- Mary Darby of Garland, Texas, elector for Texas's 5th congressional district.
- Melba McDow of Arlington, Texas, elector for Texas's 6th congressional district.
- Paul Pressler of Galveston, Texas, elector for Texas's 7th congressional district.
- James Wiggins of Conroe, Texas, elector for Texas's 8th congressional district.
- Deborah B. Cupples of Houston, Texas, elector for Texas's 9th congressional district.
- Frank E. Alvarez II of Round Rock, Texas elector for Texas's 10th congressional district.
- Russ Duerstine of San Angelo, Texas elector for Texas's 11th congressional district.
- Zan Prince of Weatherford, Texas, elector for Texas's 12th congressional district.
- Bruce Harris of Wichita Falls, Texas, elector for Texas's 13th congressional district.
- Gordon Starkenburg of Alvin, Texas, elector for Texas's 14th congressional district.
- Sandra Cararas of McAllen, Texas, elector for Texas's 15th congressional district.
- Donene O'Dell of El Paso, Texas, elector for Texas's 16th congressional district.
- Larry Lovelace of Burleson, Texas, elector for Texas's 17th congressional district.
- Nelda Eppes of Houston, Texas, elector for Texas's 18th congressional district.
- Kenneth Corbin of Lubbock, Texas, elector for Texas's 19th congressional district.
- Gene Ryder of San Antonio, Texas, elector for Texas's 20th congressional district.
- Robert E. Hierynomus of Bulverde, Texas, elector for Texas's 21st congressional district.
- Terese Raia of Sugar Land, Texas, elector for Texas's 22nd congressional district.
- Arturo Martinez de Vara of Von Ormy, Texas, elector for Texas's 23rd congressional district.
- Thomas Ferguson of Carrollton, Texas, elector for Texas's 24th congressional district.
- Robert K. Long of Bastrop, Texas, elector for Texas's 25th congressional district.
- Pat Peale of Lake Kiowa, Texas, elector for Texas's 26th congressional district.
- Joel Yowell of Corpus Christi, Texas, elector for Texas's 27th congressional district.
- Judith Hooge of Poteet, Texas, elector for Texas's 28th congressional district.
- Giovanna Searcy of Pasadena, Texas, elector for Texas's 29th congressional district.
- Patricia Ann Van Winkle of Dallas, Texas, elector for Texas's 30th congressional district.
- Ronny Risinger of Round Rock, Texas, elector for Texas's 31st congressional district.
- Frank Eikenburg of Dallas, Texas, elector for Texas's 32nd congressional district.
- Genny Hensz of New Braunfels, Texas, at-large elector.
- Talmadge L. Heflin of Houston, Texas, at-large elector.

== Utah ==
Electors: 5, pledged to John McCain and Sarah Palin:

- Scott Simpson of Kaysville, UT, elector for Utah's 1st congressional district.
- Richard Snelgrove of Salt Lake City, UT, elector for Utah's 2nd congressional district.
- Stan Lockhart of Provo, UT, elector for Utah's 3rd congressional district.
- Enid Greene Mickelsen of Draper, UT, at-large elector.
- Mark Shurtleff of Sandy, UT, at-large elector.

== Vermont ==
Electors: Three (all at-large), pledged to Barack Obama and Joe Biden:

- Claire D. Ayer of Weybridge, VT, at-large elector.
- Euan Bear of Bakersfield, VT, at-large elector.
- Kevin B. Christie of White River Junction, VT, at-large elector.

== Virginia ==
Virginia's Presidential Electors Electors: 13, pledged to Barack Obama and Joe Biden:

- Christia V. Rey of Williamsburg, VA, elector for Virginia's 1st congressional district.
- Sandra W. Brandt of Virginia Beach, VA, elector for Virginia's 2nd congressional district.
- Betty L. Squire of Richmond, VA, elector for Virginia's 3rd congressional district.
- Susan Johnston Rowland of Chesapeake, VA, elector for Virginia's 4th congressional district.
- Marc L. Finney of Lawrenceville, VA, elector for Virginia's 5th congressional district.
- Dorothy S. Blackwell of Lexington, VA, elector for Virginia's 6th congressional district.
- James Harold Allen Boyd of Culpeper, VA, elector for Virginia's 7th congressional district.
- Marian A. Van Landingham of Alexandria, VA, elector for Virginia's 8th congressional district.
- Robert Edgar Childress Jr. of Rosedale, VA, elector for Virginia's 9th congressional district.
- Rolland D. Winter of Leesburg, VA, elector for Virginia's 10th congressional district.
- Janet A. Carver of Springfield, VA, elector for Virginia's 11th congressional district.
- Michael Jon Khandelwal of Norfolk, VA, at-large elector.
- Sophie Ann Salley of Richmond, VA, at-large elector.

== Washington ==
Electors: 11, pledged to Barack Obama and Joe Biden:

- Jafar Siddiqui, of Lynnwood, WA, elector for Washington's 1st congressional district.
- Maggie J. Hanson of Bellingham, WA, elector for Washington's 2nd congressional district.
- Jane M. Buchanan‐Banks of Vancouver, WA, elector for Washington's 3rd congressional district.
- Pat M. Notter of Wenatchee, WA, elector for Washington's 4th congressional district.
- Marcus Riccelli of Spokane, WA, elector for Washington's 5th congressional district.
- Bradford L. Donovan of Montesano, WA, elector for Washington's 6th congressional district.
- Lesley G. Ahmed of Seattle, WA, elector for Washington's 7th congressional district.
- Di A. Irons of Fall City, WA, elector for Washington's 8th congressional district.
- Calvin L. Edwards of Spanaway, WA, elector for Washington's 9th congressional district.
- Kristine F. Fallstone of Dupont, WA, at-large elector.
- John M. Daniels of Seattle, WA, at-large elector.

== West Virginia ==
Electors: 5, pledged to John McCain and Sarah Palin:

- Robert Fish of Parkersburg, WV.
- Zane Lawhorn of Princeton, WV.
- Catherine Sue McKinney of Bridgeport, WV
- Mary (Marti) Riggall of Charleston, WV.
- Theresa A. Waxman of Clarksburg, WV.

== Wisconsin ==
Ten electors, pledged to Barack Obama and Joe Biden:

- Ray Rivera of Pleasant Prairie, WI.
- Fred Risser of Madison, WI.
- Rollie Hicks of Eau Claire, WI.
- Annette Polly Williams of Milwaukee, WI.
- Dian Palmer of Brookfield, WI.
- Gordon Hintz of Oshkosh, WI.
- Christine Bremer-Muggli of Wausau, WI.
- Donsia Strong Hill of Oneida, WI.
- Jim Doyle of Madison, WI.
- Joe Wineke of Verona, WI.

== Wyoming ==
Three electors, all at-large, pledged to John McCain and Sarah Palin:

- Rosa L. Goolsby of Casper, WY, at-large elector.
- Ron Micheli of Fort Bridger, WY, at-large elector.
- Susan Thomas of Casper, WY, at-large elector.

Preceded by 2004	Electoral College (United States); 2008	Succeeded by 2012
