= Peter Harckham =

American politician (born 1960)

Pete Harckham
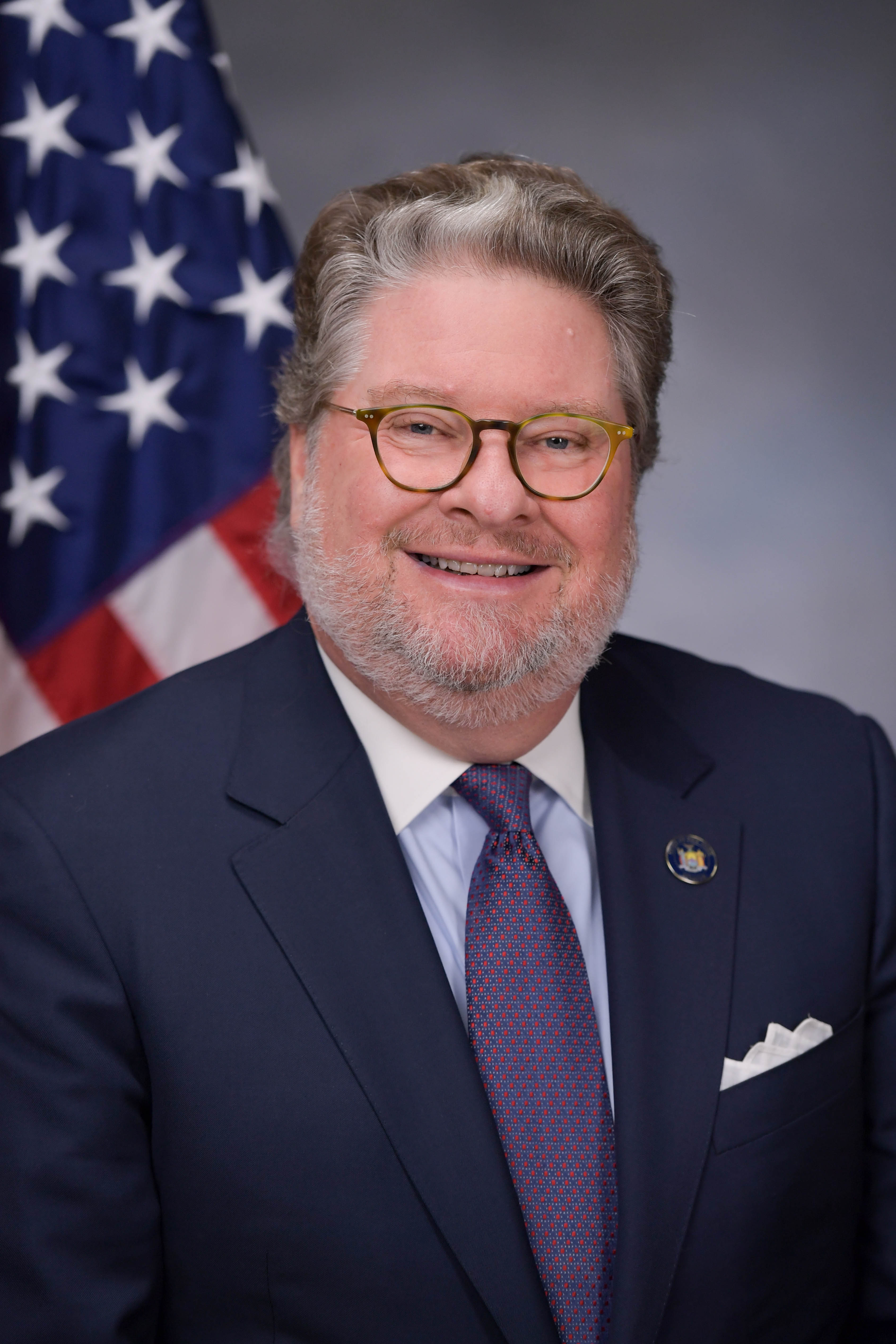

Member of the New York State Senate from the 40th district
- Incumbent
- Assumed office January 1, 2019
- Preceded by: Terrence Murphy

Member of the Westchester County Board of Legislators from the 2nd district
- In office January 8, 2008 – June 1, 2015
- Preceded by: Ursula LaMotte
- Succeeded by: Alan Cole (interim)

Personal details
- Born: Peter Benson Harckham; September 16, 1960 (age 66) Clarkstown, New York, U.S.
- Party: Democratic
- Other political affiliations: Working Families Party; Independence Party of New York
- Spouse: Jin-Hee Stevens
- Education: Dickinson College (BA)
- Website: Official website

Peter Benson Harckham (born September 16, 1960) is an American businessman and politician from the State of New York. A Democrat, Harckham represents Senate District 40 in the New York State Senate. He was first elected in 2018, defeating incumbent Terrence Murphy. The 40th district includes parts of Rockland, Putnam and Westchester counties in the Hudson Valley.

Before serving in the Senate, Harckham was a member of the Westchester County Board of Legislators and served in the administration of Andrew Cuomo.

== Background ==
Peter Benson Harckham grew up in the Hudson Valley, residing in Rockland County for most of his childhood. He attended Clarkstown High School North, before attending Dickinson College, where he graduated in English.

Harckham began his career in the advertising sector, working on Madison Avenue in the 1980s. Today he continues to work in media and advertising, and owns his own business based in the Hudson Valley.

Prior to elected office, Harckham served as President for a not for profit housing corporation that builds affordable housing in northern Westchester County. Prior to that, Harckham served as Vice Chair of the Clarence E. Heller Charitable Foundation, a San Francisco-based private foundation that supports the sustainable management of natural resources.

In 2007, Harckham was first elected to the Westchester County Board of Legislators, winning again in 2009, 2011, and 2013. He ran unsuccessfully for the New York State Assembly in a 2010 special election. He served for four terms as a county legislator, including two terms as Democratic Majority Leader. As County Legislator, he created tax breaks for first responders, lowered county taxes, and approved term limits for county legislators.

In 2012 he was a pledged elector for president Barack Obama in the electoral college. In 2015 he left the legislature to work in the administration of New York Governor Andrew Cuomo as assistant director of the Office of Community Renewal. In that position he helped administer grants in the lower Hudson Valley.

== New York Senate ==
In 2018, Harckham was recruited to run against incumbent Republican state Senator Terrence Murphy. Murphy had represented Senate District 40 since 2015. While the district was competitive, Murphy was believed to be a formidable candidate who was less vulnerable than some of his GOP colleagues. However, in an overwhelmingly Democratic election year, Harckham defeated Murphy, 51% to 49%.

Harckham was sworn in on January 1, 2019, by Governor Andrew Cuomo. In the Senate, he is serving as Chair of the Environmental Conservation Committee.

Harckham was reelected to the Senate in 2020 in a race against former Westchester County Executive Rob Astorino. Astorino conceded three weeks after election day. The count was delayed due to an increase in mail-in voting due to the COVID-19 pandemic as well as a lawsuit filed by Astorino prior to election day challenging the security of the election.

Harckham serves on the Committee on Alcoholism and Substance Abuse and the Joint Senate Task Force on Opioids, Addiction & Overdose Prevention. He is also a member of the Veterans, Homeland Security and Military Affairs committee. In the Senate, he has authored several environmental bills including Save the Hudson to clean up the Huson River, and the protection of wetlands and drinking water supplies in New York.

== Electoral history ==
=== Westchester County Legislature ===
Westchester County Legislature 2nd District 2007 General Election
Party	Candidate	Votes	%
Democratic	Peter B. Harckham	5,726	49.94%
Working Families	Peter B. Harckham	190	1.66%
Total	Peter B. Harckham	5,916	51.59%
Republican	Peter Michaelis	4,591	40.04%
Independence	Peter Michaelis	496	4.33%
Conservative	Peter Michaelis	464	4.05%
Total	Peter Michaelis	5,551	48.41%
Total votes		11,467	100%
Democratic gain from Republican			

Westchester County Legislature 2nd District 2009 General Election
Party	Candidate	Votes	%
Democratic	Peter B. Harckham	5,903	81.99%
Independence	Peter B. Harckham	1,031	14.32%
Working Families	Peter B. Harckham	266	3.69%
Total	Peter B. Harckham (incumbent)	7,200	100.00%
Total votes		7,200	100%
Democratic hold			

Westchester County Legislature 2nd District 2011 General Election
Party	Candidate	Votes	%
Democratic	Peter B. Harckham	5,160	48.66%
Independence	Peter B. Harckham	418	3.94%
Working Families	Peter B. Harckham	261	2.46%
Total	Peter B. Harckham (incumbent)	5,839	55.06%
Republican	Peter Michaelis	3,969	37.43%
Conservative	Peter Michaelis	796	7.51%
Total	Peter Michaelis	4,765	44.94%
Total votes		10,604	100%
Democratic hold			

Westchester County Legislature 2nd District 2013 Independence Party Primary
Party	Candidate	Votes	%
Independence	Peter B. Harckham	164	57.14%
write-in	Andrea Rendo	118	41.12%
Write-in		5	1.74%
Total votes		287	100%

Westchester County Legislature 2nd District 2013 General Election
Party	Candidate	Votes	%
Democratic	Peter B. Harckham	6,312	47.33%
Independence	Peter B. Harckham	411	3.08%
Working Families	Peter B. Harckham	313	2.35%
Total	Peter B. Harckham (incumbent)	7,036	52.76%
Republican	Andrea Rendo	5,331	39.98%
Conservative	Andrea Rendo	968	7.26%
Total	Andrea Rendo	6,299	47.24%
Total votes		13,335	100%
Democratic hold			

=== New York State Assembly ===
New York's 89th Assembly District 2010 Special Election
Party	Candidate	Votes	%
Republican	Robert Castelli	5,244	41.60%
Conservative	Robert Castelli	918	7.28%
Independence	Robert Castelli	804	6.38%
Total	Robert Castelli	6,966	55.26%
Democratic	Peter B. Harckham	5,329	42.28%
Working Families	Peter B. Harckham	310	2.46%
Total	Peter B. Harckham	5,639	44.74%
Total votes		12,605	100%
Republican gain from Democratic			

=== New York State Senate ===
New York's 40th Senatorial District 2018 Democratic Primary
Party	Candidate	Votes	%
Democratic	Peter B. Harckham	11,647	53.51%
Democratic	Robert T. Kesten	10,119	46.49%
Total votes		21,766	100%

New York's 40th Senatorial District 2018 General Election
Party	Candidate	Votes	%
Democratic	Peter B. Harckham	59,560	49.44%
Working Families	Peter B. Harckham	1,777	1.47%
Women's Equality	Peter B. Harckham	818	0.68%
Total	Peter B. Harckham	62,155	51.59%
Republican	Terrence P. Murphy	49,730	41.28%
Conservative	Terrence P. Murphy	6,550	5.44%
Independence	Terrence P. Murphy	1,681	1.40%
Reform	Terrence P. Murphy	360	0.30%
Total	Terrence P. Murphy (incumbent)	58,321	48.41%
Total votes		120,476	100%
Democratic gain from Republican			

New York's 40th Senatorial District 2020 General Election
Party	Candidate	Votes	%
Democratic	Peter B. Harckham	77,412	47.92%
Working Families	Peter B. Harckham	5,466	3.38%
Independence	Peter B. Harckham	939	0.58%
Total	Peter B. Harckham (incumbent)	83,817	51.88%
Republican	Rob Astorino	69,867	43.25%
Conservative	Rob Astorino	7,276	4.50%
Rebuild Our State	Rob Astorino	545	0.34%
Total	Rob Astorino	77,688	48.09%
Write-in		49	0.03%
Total votes		161,554	100%
Democratic hold			

New York's 40th Senatorial District 2022 General Election
Party	Candidate	Votes	%
Democratic	Peter B. Harckham	62,027	49.88%
Working Families	Peter B. Harckham	4,392	3.53%
Total	Peter B. Harckham (incumbent)	66,419	53.41%
Republican	Gina M. Arena	57,925	46.58%
Write-in		20	0.02%
Total votes		124,364	100.00%
Democratic hold			

New York's 40th Senatorial District 2024 General Election
Party	Candidate	Votes	%
Democratic	Peter B. Harckham	84,088	50.87%
Working Families	Peter B. Harckham	4,494	2.72%
Total	Peter B. Harckham (incumbent)	88,582	53.59%
Republican	Gina M. Arena	69,751	42.20%
Conservative	Gina M. Arena	6,909	4.18%
Total	Gina M. Arena	76,660	46.38%
Write-in		59	0.03%
Total votes		165,301	100.00%
Democratic hold			

== See also ==
- List of New York state senators
