= Sue Everhart =

American banker and politician from Georgia

Chair of the Georgia Republican Party
- In office 2007–2013
- Preceded by: Alec Poitevint
- Succeeded by: John Padgett

Personal details
- Occupation: Banker, politician

Sue Everhart is the former chairman of the Georgia Republican Party. She was succeeded by John Padgett on May 18, 2013.

== Personal life ==
Sue Everhart is a former banker and resides in Cobb County, Georgia.

== Political career ==
In May 2007, Sue was elected as the chairman of the Georgia Republican Party, becoming the first female chair in the party's history. She was re-elected in 2009 and 2011, making her also the first party chair elected to three consecutive terms. The 2011 campaign for party chairman was contentious and involved booing of Republican Governor Nathan Deal at the party convention when he voiced support for a different candidate for chairman. Sue Everhart had specifically sought support from the Tea Party movement and was ultimately re-elected on the second ballot.

The Georgia GOP, under Chairman Everhart's leadership, had a very successful 2010. Georgia made a clean sweep of statewide offices, picked up a Congressional Seat, and gained seats in both the Georgia House and Senate.

The 2012 elections saw additional gains, two more State Senate seats were won, giving the GOP a super-majority in the Senate. House gains put the Republicans one seat away from a super-majority in the House. Georgia delivered for Presidential Candidate Mitt Romney in 2012, increasing the margin of victory for the GOP nominee for president over 2008.

In addition to serving as party chairman, Sue has been personally involved in the local affairs of Cobb County. She was formerly Chairman of the Cobb Board of Elections, a board member of the Cobb County Convention and Visitors Bureau, and a member of the Cultural Arts Board of Cobb County.

On April 1, 2013, Everhart made headlines by suggesting that if same sex marriage is legalized there is a risk that people who are "as straight as an arrow" will take advantage of it by pretending to be gay and marrying other heterosexuals strictly for the benefits to which they may then be entitled.
