= List of 2000 United States presidential electors =

This is a list of electors (members of the Electoral College) who cast ballots to elect the President of the United States and Vice President of the United States in the 2000 presidential election. There are 538 electors from the 50 states and the District of Columbia. While every state except Nebraska and Maine chooses the electors by statewide vote, many states require that one elector be designated for each congressional district. Except where otherwise noted, such designations refer to the elector's residence in that district rather than election by the voters of the district.

== Alabama ==
Electors: 9, pledged to George W. Bush and Dick Cheney

- Glen Dunlap
- Bob Fincher
- Homer Jackson
- Jerry Lathan
- Elaine Little
- Melba Peters
- Martha Stokes
- Jean Sullivan
- Edgar Welden

== Alaska ==
Electors: 3, pledged to George W. Bush and Dick Cheney

- Bill J. Allen
- Susan Fischetti
- Lucy Groh

== Arizona ==
Electors: 8, pledged to George W. Bush and Dick Cheney

- Joe Arpaio
- Linda Barber
- Dennis Booth
- Webb Crockett
- Paul Robert Fannin
- LaVelle McCoy
- Susan D. Minnaugh
- Frank Straka

== Arkansas ==
Electors: 6, pledged to George W. Bush and Dick Cheney

- Pat Dodge
- Bud Cummins
- Mildred Homan
- Betsy Thompson
- Jim Hendren
- Sarah Agee

== California ==
Electors: 54, pledged to Al Gore and Joe Lieberman

- Sunil Aghi
- Amy Arambula
- Rachel Binah
- R. Stephen Bollinger
- Roberts Braden
- Laura Karolina Capps
- Anni Chung
- Joseph A. Cislowski
- Sheldon Cohn
- Thor Emblem
- Elsa Favila
- John Freidenrich
- Cecelia Fuentes
- Glen Fuller
- James Garrison
- Sally Goehring
- Florence Gold
- Jill S. Hardy
- Therese Horsting
- Georgie Huff
- Robert Eugene Hurd
- Harriet A. Ingram
- Robert Jordan
- John Koza
- John Laird
- N. Mark Lam
- Manuel M. Lopez
- Henry Lozano
- David Mann
- Beverly Martin
- R. Keith McDonald
- Carol D. Norberg
- Ron Oberndorfer
- Gerard Orozco
- Trudy Owens
- Gregory S. Pettis
- Flo Rene Pickett
- Theodore H. Plant
- Art Pulaski
- Eloise Reyes
- Alex Arthur Reza
- C. Craig Roberts
- Jason Rodríguez
- Luis D. Rojas
- Howard L. Schock
- Lane Sherman
- David A. Torres
- Larry Trullinger
- Angelo Tsakopoulos
- Richard Valle
- Karen Waters
- Don Wilcox
- William K. Wong
- Rosalind Wyman

== Colorado ==
Electors: 8, pledged to George W. Bush and Dick Cheney

- Bob Beauprez
- Marcy Benson
- Robert Dieter
- Mary Hergert
- Robert Martinez
- Ralph Nagel
- Lilly Nunez
- Joe Rogers

== Connecticut ==
Electors: 8, pledged to Al Gore and Joe Lieberman

- Nick Balletto
- Frank Cirillo
- Marilyn Cohen
- Gloria Collins
- Kimberly Ford
- Thomas McDonough
- Ken Slapin
- Clorinda Soldevila

== Delaware ==
Electors: 3, pledged to Al Gore and Joe Lieberman

- Michael A. Begatto
- Margaret Rose Henry
- Ruth Ann Messick

== District of Columbia ==
Electors: 2, pledged to Al Gore and Joe Lieberman (excluding faithless elector)

- William Simons
- Nadine P. Winter
- Barbara Lett-Simmons (faithless elector) – vote abstained

== Florida ==
Electors: 25, pledged to George W. Bush and Dick Cheney

- Alred S. Austin
- Deborah L. Brooks
- Armando Codina
- Maria De La Milera
- Sandra M. Faulkner
- Thomas C. Feeney III
- Feliciano M. Foyo
- Jeanne Barber Godwin
- Dawn Guzzetta
- Cynthia M. Handley
- Adam W. Herbert
- Al Hoffman
- Glenda E. Hood
- Carole Jean Jordan
- Charles W. Kane
- Mel Martinez
- John M. McKay
- Dorsey C. Miller
- Berta J. Moralejo
- H. Gary Morse
- Marsha Nippert
- Darryl K. Sharpton
- Tom Slade
- John Thrasher
- Robert L. Woody

== Georgia ==
Electors: 13, pledged to George W. Bush and Dick Cheney

- Anna R. Cablik
- Teresa Jeter Chappell
- Charles Commander Clay
- Fred Cooper
- James C. Edenfield
- Winnie C. LeClercq
- Brenda R. (B.J.) Lopez
- Carolyn Dodgen Meadows
- Alec Poitevint
- Eric Tanenblatt
- Cynthia Teasley
- Virgil R. Williams
- Bob Young

== Hawaii ==
Electors: 4, pledged to Al Gore and Joe Lieberman

- Michael Amii
- Marsha Joyner
- Joy Kobashigawa Lewis
- Pedro Racelis Jr.

== Idaho ==
Electors: 4, pledged to George W. Bush and Dick Cheney

- Phil Batt
- Connie Hansen
- James McClure
- Orriette Sinclair

== Illinois ==
Electors: 22, pledged to Al Gore and Joe Lieberman

- Joan Brennan
- Dave Bybee, Vilma Colom
- Barbara Flynn Currie
- John P. Daley
- Vera Davis
- James DeLeo
- Marge Friedman
- Charles A. Hartke
- Kathryn 'Tinker' Harvey
- Carolyn Brown Hodge
- Constance A. Howard
- Mary Lou Kearns
- Michael J. Madigan
- William Marovitz
- Shirley McCombs
- Molly McKenzie
- Victory McNamara
- John Nelson
- Donald Pedro
- Daniel M. Pierce
- Jerry Sinclair

== Indiana ==
Electors: 12, pledged to George W. Bush and Dick Cheney

- Rodric D. Bray
- Roger A. Chiabai
- Beverly Gard
- Don Heckard
- Marla Irving
- Virginia Lee
- P.E. MacAllister
- Barbara L. McClellan
- Michael D. McDaniel
- Max Middendorf
- Michael Miner
- Virgil Scheidt

== Iowa ==
Electors: 7, pledged to Al Gore and Joe Lieberman

- Jeff Heland
- Angelyn King
- Paulee Lipsman
- Emil Pavich
- John O'Brien
- Ernest Ricehill
- David Tingwald

== Kansas ==
Electors: 6, pledged to George W. Bush and Dick Cheney

- Shari Caywood
- Gene Eastin
- Richard Eckert
- Susan Estes
- Mark Heitz
- Charles Hostetler

== Kentucky ==
Electors: 8, pledged to George W. Bush and Dick Cheney

- George S. Beard
- William S. Farish Jr.
- Robert B. Fearing
- Connie S. Hayes
- G. Richard Noss Jr.
- A. Douglas Reece
- Michael A. Shea
- Larry Joe Walden

== Louisiana ==
Electors: 9, pledged to George W. Bush and Dick Cheney

- Patricia Brister
- Donald Ensenat
- Heulette Fontenot Jr.
- Mike Foster
- Steve Jordan
- Elizabeth Levy
- Al Lippman
- Suzanne Haik Terrell
- Michael Woods Sr.

== Maine ==
Electors: 4, pledged to Al Gore and Joe Lieberman

- Joseph Mayo (District 1)
- William Phillips (District 2)
- Christopher Babbidge (at-large)
- Dorothy Melanson (at-large)

== Maryland ==
Electors: 10, pledged to Al Gore and Joe Lieberman

- Clarence W. Blount
- Gene W. Counihan
- Howard Friedman
- Mary Ann E. Love
- Thomas V. Mike Miller
- Mary Butler Murphy
- Mary Jo Neville
- Gregory Pecoraro
- Ina Taylor
- Beatrice P. Tignor

== Massachusetts ==
Electors: 12, pledged to Al Gore and Joe Lieberman

- Patrica Armstrong
- Russell A. Ashton
- George C. Barnoski
- Robert E. Colt
- Stephen Patrick Driscoll
- John M. Flynn
- Roberta Goldman
- Etta B. Goodstein
- Frederick R. Koed
- Margaret MacKenzie
- Carolyne DeVore Parks
- Marcia L. Sweeney

== Michigan ==
Electors: 18, pledged to Al Gore and Joe Lieberman

- Lana Boldi
- John D. Cherry
- Patty Fedewa
- Sigrid L. Grace
- Dona Jean Graham
- Freman Hendrix
- Jeff Jenks
- John Kelly
- Don Oetman
- Ken Oke
- Charles Prather
- Jim Ramey
- Iris K. Salters
- Judith L. Strong
- David P. Taylor
- Juli Trudell
- Mary Warner
- Marie Weigold

== Minnesota ==
Electors: 10, pledged to Al Gore and Joe Lieberman

- Carol Bartels
- Prudy Cameron
- Joan Campbell
- Elmer Deutschmann
- Elizabeth Kalisch
- Matthew Little
- Glenda Meixell
- John Meuers
- Janis Ray
- Georgiana Ruzich

== Mississippi ==
Electors: 8, pledged to George W. Bush and Dick Cheney

- Bob Anthony
- Miki Cassidy
- Thomas Colbert
- Delbert Hosemann
- Ellen Jernigan
- John Junkin
- Kent Nicaud

== Missouri ==
Electors: 11, pledged to George W. Bush and Dick Cheney

- David Barklage
- Bruce Bredeman
- Marc Ellinger
- Gordon Elliott
- John Hancock
- Stan Horacek
- Homer Johnson
- John Judd
- Michael Korte
- Dennis Owens
- Al Rotskoff

== Montana ==
Electors: 3, pledged to George W. Bush and Dick Cheney

- Thelma Baker
- Jack Galt
- Tillie Pierce

== Nebraska ==
Electors: 5, pledged to George W. Bush and Dick Cheney

- Mary Johnson (District 1)
- Lee Terry, Sr. (District 2)
- Howard Lamb (District 3)
- Mildred Curtis
- John Y. McCollister (at-large)

== Nevada ==
Electors: 4, pledged to George W. Bush and Dick Cheney

- Jane Ham
- Trudy Hushbeck
- William Raggio
- Tom Wiesner

== New Hampshire ==
Electors: 4, pledged to George W. Bush and Dick Cheney

- Stephen Duprey
- Wayne MacDonald
- Augusta Petrone
- Alida Weergang

== New Jersey ==
Electors: 15, pledged to Al Gore and Joe Lieberman

- Paul M. Bangiola
- Angelo R. Bianchi
- Mamie Bridgeforth
- Dennis P. Collins
- John Garrett
- Deborah Lynch
- Patricia McCullough
- John P. McGreevey
- June B. Montag
- W. Michael Murphy
- Jeffrey L. Nash
- Barbara A. Plumeri
- Julia Valdivia
- Stephen S. Weinstein
- Charles Wowkanech

== New Mexico ==
Electors: 5, pledged to Al Gore and Joe Lieberman

- Thomas Atcitty
- Rick Blea
- Diane D. Denish
- Jeep Gilliland
- Mary Gail Gwaltney

== New York ==
Electors: 33, pledged to Al Gore and Joe Lieberman

- Susan I. Abramowitz
- Leslie Alpert
- Martin S. Begun
- David L. Cohen
- Carolee A. Conklin
- Martin Connor
- Lorraine Cortez Vasquez
- Inez Dickens
- Cynthia Emmer
- Herman D. Farrell Jr.
- Emily Giske
- Patrick G. Halpin
- Raymond B. Harding
- Judith Hope
- Denis M. Hughes
- Virginia Kee
- Bertha Lewis
- Alberta Madonna
- Thomas J. Manton
- Deborah Marciano
- Helen Marshall
- Carl McCall
- Elizabeth F. Momrow
- Clarence Norman Jr.
- Daniel F. Donohue
- Shirley O'Connell
- G. Steven Pigeon
- Roberto Ramirez
- Michael Schell
- Sheldon Silver
- Andrew Spano
- Eliot Spitzer
- Randi Weingarten

== North Carolina ==
Electors: 14, pledged to George W. Bush and Dick Cheney

- Fran Barnhart
- Claude Billings
- Sam Currin
- Tom Dwiggins
- A. Dial Gray
- Barbara Holt
- Marshall Hurley
- Margaret King
- Jeff Mixon
- Joe L. Morgan
- Steve Rader
- Robert Rector
- Dewitt Rhoades
- Linda Young

== North Dakota ==
Electors: 3, pledged to George W. Bush and Dick Cheney

- Rosemarie Myrdal, lieutenant governor of North Dakota
- Edward T. Schafer, governor of North Dakota
- Bryce Streibel

== Ohio ==
Electors: 21, pledged to George W. Bush and Dick Cheney

- Alex R. Arshinkoff
- Alan P. Bedol
- Robert T. Bennett
- Deborah Burstion-Donbraye
- John J. Chester
- John D. Chiappetta
- Leanna Coil
- Jo Ann Davidson
- Danny D. Hamilton
- Donna J. Harter
- Pat Hennessey
- Paul M. Hoag
- John H. McConnell
- Doug Miller
- Pakkiri Rajagopal
- Mercer Reynolds
- Pauline S. Riel
- Shirley Sadler
- Donald G. Simmons
- Clarence R. Smith
- William R. Timken

== Oklahoma ==
Electors: 8, pledged to George W. Bush and Dick Cheney

- Steve Byas
- James Cruson
- Paul Hollrah
- Kristal Markowitz
- Bob McDowell
- Donald O'Nesky
- Tom Prince
- George Wiland

== Oregon ==
Electors: 7, pledged to Al Gore and Joe Lieberman

- Barbara Davidson
- Jim Edmunson
- Moshe Lenske
- Dorothy MacKay
- Louise Poteet
- Maria Smithson
- Judy Sugnet

== Pennsylvania ==
Electors: 23, pledged to Al Gore and Joe Lieberman

- Kathy Black
- Richard W. Bloomingdale
- Robert P. Casey Jr.
- H. William DeWeese
- Nelson Diaz
- William M. George
- Ken Jarin
- James J. Johnston
- Edward Keller
- Robert Mellow
- Tom Murphy
- Robert O'Connor
- Lazar M. Palnick
- Stephen R. Reed
- T. J. Rooney
- Joyce Savocchio
- John F. Street
- Patsy J. Tallarico
- Christine M. Tartaglione
- Margaret M. Tartaglione
- Marian Tasco
- Sala Udin
- Anna Verna

== Rhode Island ==
Electors: 4, pledged to Al Gore and Joe Lieberman

- Joyce E. Caprio, wife of Chief of Justice of Providence Municipal Court Frank Caprio
- Donald R. Sweitzer
- Mark S. Weiner
- Susan Weiner

== South Carolina ==
Electors: 8, pledged to George W. Bush and Dick Cheney

- Cynthia F. Costa
- Danny R. Faulkner
- Thomas H. McLean
- William B. Prince
- Dan Richardson
- Douglas L. Wavle
- Cecil F. Windham Sr.
- Buddy Witherspoon

== South Dakota ==
Electors: 3, pledged to George W. Bush and Dick Cheney

- Carole Hillard, lieutenant governor of South Dakota
- William J. Janklow, governor of South Dakota
- Joel Rosenthal

== Tennessee ==
Electors: 11, pledged to George W. Bush and Dick Cheney

- Lamar Alexander, former Education secretary
- Daniel Dirksen Baker
- Lana Bowman Ball
- Nancy Cunningham
- Winfield Dunn, former governor
- Jimmy Exum
- Jim Henry
- Raja Jubran
- Anie Kent
- Patti Saliba
- Mamon Wright

== Texas ==
Electors: 32, pledged to George W. Bush and Dick Cheney

- Ernie Angelo
- James R. Batsell
- Carmen P. Castillo
- Mary Ceverha
- Ken Clark
- Hally B. Clements
- Mary E. Cowart
- Sue Daniel
- Michael Dugas
- Betty R. Hines
- Jim Hamlin
- Cruz G. Hernandez
- Chuck Jones
- William Earl Juett
- Neal J. Katz
- Betsy Lake
- Adair Margo
- Loyce McCarter
- Joseph I. Oniell III
- Michael Paddie
- Nancy Palm
- Howard Pebley Jr.
- Robert J. Peden
- Helen Quiram
- James B. Randall
- Clyde Moody Siebman
- Stan Stanart
- Henry W. Teich Jr.
- Randal Tye Thomas
- James Davidson Walker
- Tom F. Ward Jr.
- Gayle West

== Utah ==
Electors: 5, pledged to George W. Bush and Dick Cheney

- Lewis Billings
- Arlene Ellis
- Ron Fox
- Michael O. Leavitt
- Olene S. Walker

== Vermont ==
Electors: 3, pledged to Al Gore and Joe Lieberman

- Violet Coffin
- A. Jeffry Taylor
- Alan Weiss

== Virginia ==
Electors: 13, pledged to George W. Bush and Dick Cheney

- Parker J. Bena
- Vincent F. Callahan Jr.
- Patsy W. Drain
- Gloria Taylor Fisher
- Ann H. Garrett
- Philip J. Infantino III
- Edith M. Light
- Luther E. 'Ikey' Miller
- Frances M. Sadler
- George William Thomas Jr.
- H. Evans Thomas V
- Gary E. Waddell
- Peyton Anthony White

== Washington ==
Electors: 11, pledged to Al Gore and Joe Lieberman

- Debbie Aldrich
- Vic Battson
- Charlotte Coker
- Jim Frush
- Tim Hattenburg
- Rachel Lake
- Nancy McGinnis
- Carol Sue Perkins
- Debbie Regala
- Carl Schwartz
- Paul Steinberg

== West Virginia ==
Electors: 5, pledged to George W. Bush and Dick Cheney

- James H. Harless
- John H. McCutcheon II
- Jo Slaughter
- Charles S. Trump IV
- Flip West

== Wisconsin ==
Electors: 11, pledged to Al Gore and Joe Lieberman

- Alice Clausing
- Pedro Colon
- Paulette Copeland
- Reynolds Honold
- Joan Kaeding
- Mark McQuate
- Ruth Miner-Kessel
- Christine Sinicki
- Tim Sullivan
- Angela Sutkiewicz
- Charlie Wolden

== Wyoming ==
Electors: 3, pledged to George W. Bush and Dick Cheney

- Judy Catchpole
- Gale Geringer
- John Patton

Preceded by 1996	Electoral College (United States); 2000	Succeeded by 2004
