= List of 2004 United States presidential electors =

This is a list of electors (members of the Electoral College) who cast ballots to elect the President of the United States and Vice President of the United States in the 2004 presidential election. There are 538 electors from the 50 states and the District of Columbia. While every state except Nebraska and Maine chooses the electors by statewide vote, many states require that one elector be designated for each congressional district. Except where otherwise noted, such designations refer to the elector's residence in that district rather than election by the voters of the district.

== Alabama ==
– Republican –

1. Beth Chapman (born 1962) of Birmingham, at-large elector. Chapman is the Alabama State Auditor; a public relations and political consultant, she worked with several Republican campaigns in Alabama, serves as press secretary and campaign manager for Steve Windom, and was elected state auditor in 2002.
2. Marty Connors of Alabaster, at-large elector. Connors is the chair of the Alabama Republican Party.
3. Martha Hosey of Gulf Shore, elector for the 1st Congressional district. Hosey has been an officer in the Alabama Federation of Republican Women.
4. Will Sellers of Montgomery, elector for the 2nd Congressional district. Sellers, an attorney, is a veteran of multiple Republican campaigns.
5. Mike Hubbard of Auburn, elector for the 3rd Congressional district. Hubbard represents the 79th district in the Alabama House of Representatives, first elected in 1998.
6. Floyd Lawson of Cullman, elector for the 4th Congressional district.
7. Elbert Peters of Huntsville, elector for the 5th Congressional district.
8. Bettye Fine Collins of Trussville, elector for the 6th Congressional district.
9. Martha Stokes of Carrollton, Alabama, elector for the 7th Congressional district.

== Alaska ==
– Republican –

1. Gloria J. Tokar of Palmer, Alaska.
2. Frederick H. Hahn of Anchorage, Alaska.
3. Roberly R. Waldron of Anchorage, Alaska

== Arizona ==
– Republican

1. Linda Barber
2. Malcolm Barrett
3. Jim Click
4. Cynthia J. Collins
5. Webb Crockett
6. Elizabeth Wilkinson Fannin
7. Ross Farnsworth
8. Ira A. Fulton
9. Bernice C. Roberts
10. Phillip Townsend

== Arkansas ==
– Republican

1. Bobbi Dodge, elector for the 1st congressional district.
2. Gay White, elector for the 1st congressional district.
3. Ida Fineburg, elector for the 1st congressional district.
4. John Felts, elector for the 1st congressional district.
5. Jim Davis, at-large elector.
6. Martha McCaskill, at-large elector.

== California ==
– Democratic –

1. Robert H. Manley of Los Angeles, at-large elector.
2. Barbara Schraeger of Sausalito, at-large elector.
3. C. Paul Johnson of Napa, elector for the 1st Congressional district.
4. Gary Simmons of Chico, elector for the 2nd Congressional district.
5. Paul Batterson of Fair Oaks, elector for the 3rd Congressional district.
6. Diana Madoshi of Rocklin, elector for the 4th Congressional district.
7. Kyriakos Tsakopoulos of Granite Bay, elector for the 5th Congressional district.
8. Donald Linker of Tiburon, elector for the 6th Congressional district.
9. Paula Sandusky of Vacaville, elector for the 7th Congressional district.
10. Adam Woo of San Francisco, elector for the 8th Congressional district.
11. Chloe Drew of San Francisco, elector for the 9th Congressional district.
12. Karl Slifer of San Ramon, elector for the 10th Congressional district.
13. Gary Prost of Livermore, elector for the 11th Congressional district.
14. Joseph Cotchett of Burlingame, elector for the 12th Congressional district.
15. John Smith of Fremont, elector for the 13th Congressional district.
16. George Marcus of Los Altos Hills, elector for the 14th Congressional district.
17. Mark Hsu of Atherton, elector for the 15th Congressional district.
18. Adele Bihn of San Jose, elector for the 16th Congressional district.
19. Darrell Darling of Santa Cruz, elector for the 17th Congressional district.
20. Amarjit Dhaliwal of Modesto, elector for the 18th Congressional district.
21. Rocco Davis of Roseville, elector for the 19th Congressional district.
22. Kenneth Costa of Fresno, elector for the 20th Congressional district.
23. Barbara Pyle of Fresno, elector for the 21st Congressional district.
24. David Johnson of Los Angeles, elector for the 22nd Congressional district.
25. Andrew M. Siegel of Santa Barbara, elector for the 23rd Congressional district.
26. Michael Carpenter of Lake View Terrace, elector for the 24th Congressional district.
27. Lynda Von Husen of Palmdale, elector for the 25th Congressional district.
28. Randy Monroe of Running Springs, elector for the 26th Congressional district.
29. Lane M. Sherman of Northridge, elector for the 27th Congressional district.
30. Moreen Blum of Sherman Oaks, elector for the 28th Congressional district.
31. Yolanda Dyer of Norwalk, elector for the 28th Congressional district.
32. Paul I. Goldenberg of La Habra Heights, elector for the 29th Congressional district.
33. Lenore Wax of Los Angeles, elector for the 30th Congressional district.
34. Mitch O'Farrell of Los Angeles, elector for the 31st Congressional district.
35. Franklin A. Acevedo of Los Angeles, elector for the 32nd Congressional district.
36. Gwen Moore of Los Angeles, elector for the 33rd Congressional district.
37. Pedro Carillo of Los Angeles, elector for the 34th Congressional district.
38. Karen Walters of Inglewood, elector for the 35th Congressional district.
39. Ted Lieu of Torrance, elector for the 36th Congressional district.
40. Valerie McDonald of Long Beach, elector for the 37th Congressional district.
41. Marvin Kropke of Pasadena, elector for the 39th Congressional district.
42. Douglas E. Hitchcock of Garden Grove, elector for the 40th Congressional district.
43. Barbara Kerr of Riverside, elector for the 41st Congressional district.
44. Salvador Sanchez of Los Angeles, elector for the 42nd Congressional district.
45. Joe Baca, Jr. of San Bernardino, elector for the 43rd Congressional district.
46. Grant Gruber of Riverside, elector for the 44th Congressional district.
47. James T. Ewing of Yucaipa, elector for the 45th Congressional district.
48. Louise Giacoppe of Huntington Beach, elector for the 46th Congressional district.
49. James G. Bohm of Irvine, elector for the 47th Congressional district.
50. N. Mark Lam of Fountain Valley, elector for the 48th Congressional district.
51. Chuck Lowery of Oceanside, elector for the 49th Congressional district.
52. Susan Koehler of Carlsbad, elector for the 50th Congressional district.
53. Mary Salas of Chula Vista, elector for the 51st Congressional district.
54. Andrew Benjamin of Spring Valley, elector for the 52nd Congressional district.
55. Margaret Lawrence of San Diego, elector for the 53rd Congressional district.

== Colorado ==
– Republican

1. Theodore S. Halaby
2. Robert A. Martinez
3. Lilly Y. Nunez
4. Cynthia H. Murphy
5. Sylvia Morgan-Smith
6. Diane B. Gallagher
7. Vicki A. Edwards
8. Frances W. Owens, wife of Governor Bill Owens
9. Booker T. Graves

== Connecticut ==
– Democratic

1. Elizabeth O'Neill
2. Andrea J. Jackson-Brooks
3. Donna King
4. Larry Pleasant
5. David J. Papandrea
6. Andres Ayala, Jr.
7. Joshua King

== Delaware ==
– Democratic

1. James Johnson
2. Nancy W. Cook
3. Timothy G. Willard

== District of Columbia ==
– Democratic –

1. Linda W. Cropp
2. Jack Evans
3. Arrington Dixon

== Florida ==
– Republican

1. Al Austin
2. Allan Bense
3. Sally Bradshaw
4. Al Cárdenas
5. Jennifer Carroll
6. Armando Codina
7. Sharon Day
8. Maria de la Milera
9. Jim Dozier
10. David Griffin
11. Fran Hancock
12. Cynthia Handley
13. William Harrison
14. Al Hoffman
15. Bill Jordan
16. Tom Lee
17. Randall McElheney
18. Jeanne McIntosh
19. Nancy Mihm
20. Gary Morse
21. Marilyn Paul
22. Tom Petway
23. Sergio Pino
24. John Thrasher
25. Janet Westling
26. Robert Woody
27. Zach Zachariah

== Georgia ==
– Republican –

1. Anna R. Cablik
2. Fred Cooper
3. Nancy N. Coverdell
4. James C. Edenfield
5. Karen Handel
6. Donald F. Layfield
7. Carolyn Dodgen Meadows
8. Sunny K. Park
9. Alec Poitevint
10. Joan Ransom
11. Narender G. Reddy
12. Jame Raynolds
13. Norma Mountain Rogers
14. Eric Tanenblatt
15. Virgil Williams

== Hawaii ==
– Democratic

1. Frances Kagawa
2. Joy Kobashigawa Lewis
3. Samuel Mitchell
4. Dolly Strazar

== Idaho ==
– Republican

1. Pete Cenarrusa
2. Debbie Field
3. Sandra Patano
4. John Sandy

== Illinois ==
– Democratic

1. Constance A. Howard
2. Carrie Austin
3. Shirley R. Madigan
4. Tony Muñoz
5. James DeLeo
6. Joan Brennan
7. Vera Davis
8. Linda Pasternak
9. William A. Marovitz
10. Daniel M. Pierce
11. Debbie Halvorson
12. Molly McKenzie
13. Beth Ann May
14. Mary Lou Kearns
15. Lynn Foster
16. John Nelson
17. Mary Boland
18. Shirley McCombs
19. Jerry Sinclair
20. Barbara Flynn Currie
21. John R. Daley

== Indiana ==
– Republican

1. Kenneth Culp
2. John Zentz
3. Michael Miner
4. Saundra Huddleston
5. Leeann Cook
6. Ted Ogle
7. Melissa Proffitt Reese
8. Dudley Curea
9. Larry Shickles
10. James Kittle
11. Jean Ann Harcourt

== Iowa ==
– Republican

1. Julie Hosch
2. Velma Huebner
3. Don Racheter
4. Marilyn Bose
5. Don Kass
6. Dorothy Schlitter
7. Wanda Sears

== Kansas ==
– Republican –

1. Ruth Garvey Fink of Topeka.
2. Bernard "Bud" Hentzen of Wichita.
3. Dennis Jones of Lakin.
4. Wanda Konold of Pratt.
5. Jack Ranson of Wichita.
6. Patricia Pitney Smith of Overland Park.

== Kentucky ==
– Republican

1. Rachel N. McCubbin, elector for the 1st Congressional district.
2. Keith A. Hall, elector for the 2nd Congressional district.
3. Carolyn Cole, elector for the 3rd Congressional district.
4. Martha G. Prewitt, elector for the 4th Congressional district.
5. Donald E. Girdler, elector for the 5th Congressional district.
6. Constance M. Gray, elector for the 6th Congressional district.
7. Frank Schwendeman, at-large elector.
8. Carla T. Bartleman, at-large elector.

== Louisiana ==
– Republican

1. Winston Thomas "Tom" Angers
2. Michael Bayham
3. David R. Carroll
4. Archie Corder
5. Floyd Gonzalez
6. E. Gerald Hebert
7. John H. Musser, IV
8. Salvador "Sal" Palmisano, III
9. Ruth Ulrich

== Maine ==
– Democratic

1. Lu Bauer, elector for the 1st Congressional district.
2. David Garrity, elector for the 2nd Congressional district.
3. Jill Duson, at-large elector.
4. Samuel Shapiro, at-large elector.

== Maryland ==
– Democratic –

1. Norman Conway
2. Delores G. Kelley
3. Lainey Lebow Sachs
4. Pam Jackson
5. Dorothy Chaney
6. John Riley
7. Wendy Fielder
8. Daphne Bloomberg
9. Tom Perez
10. Gary Gensler

== Massachusetts ==
– Democratic

1. Cathaleen L. Ashton
2. Sharon Pollard
3. Elizabeth Moroney
4. Helen Covington
5. Candice E. Lopes
6. Susan Thomson
7. Robert P. Cassidy
8. William P. Dooling
9. William Eddy
10. Thomas V. Barbera
11. Mushtaque A. Mirza
12. Calvin T. Brown

== Michigan ==
– Democratic

1. Carol Vining Moore
2. Margaret Robinson
3. Ida I. DeHaas
4. Marcela L. Ort
5. Vickie Sue Price
6. Paul Todd
7. Leonard Smigielski
8. Bruce McAttee
9. Stanley W. Harris
10. Yvonne Williams
11. Elizabeth D. Tavarozzi
12. Charley Jackson, Jr.
13. Joan Robinson Cheeks
14. Roger Short
15. Harless Scott
16. Richard Shoemaker
17. Michael Pitt

== Minnesota ==
– Democratic-Farmer-Labor

1. Sonja Berg of St. Cloud
2. Vi Grooms-Alban of Cohasset
3. Matthew Little of Maplewood
4. Michael Meuers of Bemidji
5. Tim O'Brien of Edina
6. Lil Ortendahl of Osakis
7. Everett Pettiford of Minneapolis
8. Jean Schiebel of Brooklyn Center
9. Frank Simon of Chaska
10. Chandler Harrison “Harry” Stevens of Austin

One elector voted for John Edwards (whose name they erroneously spelled as John Ewards) for both President and vice-president.

== Mississippi ==
– Republican –

1. Kelly Segars of Iuka
2. John Phillips of Yazoo City
3. Wayne Parker of Madison
4. Jimmy Creekmore of Jackson
5. Victor Mavar of Biloxi
6. Billy Mounger of Jackson

== Missouri ==
– Republican –

1. Rosemary Kochner – 1st Congressional District
2. Fred Dyer – 2nd Congressional District
3. Miriam Stonebraker – 3rd Congressional District
4. Carolyn McDowell – 4th Congressional District
5. Cathy Owens – 5th Congressional District
6. Steve Krueger – 6th Congressional District
7. Emory Melton – 7th Congressional District
8. John Schudy – 8th Congressional District
9. Richard Hardy – 9th Congressional District
10. John Marshalk – State at-large
11. Warren Erdman – State at-large

== Montana ==
– Republican –

1. Jack Galt of Martinsdale
2. Thelma Baker of Missoula
3. John Brenden of Scobey

== Nebraska ==
– Republican –

1. Curt Bromm – 1st Congressional District
2. Michael John Hogan – 2nd Congressional District
3. Bill Barrett – 3rd Congressional District
4. Kay Orr – State at-large
5. Ken Stinson – State at-large

== Nevada ==
– Republican –

1. Joe Brown of Las Vegas
2. Milton Schwartz of Las Vegas
3. John Marvel of Battle Mountain
4. Beverly Willard of Carson City
5. Paul Willis of Pahrump

== New Hampshire ==
– Democratic –

1. Jeanne Shaheen of Madbury
2. Peter Burling of Cornish
3. Judy Reardon of Manchester
4. James Ryan of Henniker

== New Jersey ==
– Democratic –

1. Warren Wallace
2. Wilfredo Caraballo – State Assemblyman and former New Jersey Public Advocate
3. Tom Canzanella
4. Carolyn Walch
5. Peggy Anastos
6. Bernard Kenny – Majority Leader of the State Senate
7. Ronald Rice – State Senator and Deputy Mayor of Newark
8. Abed Awad
9. Jack McGreevey – Father of former Gov. James McGreevey
10. Wendy Benchley
11. Loni Kaplan
12. Carolyn Wade
13. Riletta L. Cream
14. Bernadette McPherson – Bergen County Freeholder
15. Upendra Chivukula – State Assemblyman

== New Mexico ==
– Republican –

1. Rod Adair
2. Ruth D. Kelly
3. Rick Lopez
4. Lou Melvin
5. Rod Montoya

== New York ==
– Democratic

1. Joseph Ashton
2. Bill de Blasio – New York City Councilman
3. Molly Clifford
4. Lorraine Cortés-Vázquez
5. Inez Dickens – Vice Chair, New York State Democratic Committee
6. Danny Donahue
7. Herman D. Farrell Jr. – New York State Assemblyman; chair, New York State Democratic Committee
8. C. Virginia Fields – Manhattan Borough President
9. Emily Giske
10. Bea Gonzalez
11. Alan Hevesi – New York State Comptroller
12. Frank Hoare
13. Félix W. Ortiz- New York State Assemblyman for 51st District of New York
14. Virginia Kee
15. Peggy Kerry
16. Denise King
17. Len Lenihan – Chairman of the Erie County Democratic Committee
18. Bertha Lewis – Co-chair, Working Families Party
19. Alan Lubin
20. Thomas Manton – chair, Queens County Democratic Committee; Former Congressman
21. Dennis Mehiel – 2002 Democratic Nominee for Lieutenant Governor of New York
22. June O'Neill
23. David Paterson – Minority Leader, New York State Senate
24. Jose Rivera – New York State Assemblyman; chair, Bronx County Democratic Committee
25. Rich Schaffer
26. Chung Seto
27. Sheldon Silver – Speaker, New York State Assembly
28. Eliot Spitzer – Attorney General of New York
29. Antoine Thompson – Buffalo City Councilman
30. Paul Tokasz – Majority Leader, New York State Assembly
31. Bill Wood
32. Robert Zimmerman

== North Carolina ==
– Republican

1. Joseph W. Powell, Jr.
2. Ann Sullivan
3. William B. Carraway
4. Sandra Carter
5. William H. Trotter
6. Thomas D. Luckadoo
7. Judy Keener
8. Marcia M. Spiegel
9. Dewitt Rhoades
10. Davey G. Williamson
11. Theresa Esposito
12. Elizabeth Kelly
13. Larry W. Potts
14. Joe Morgan
15. Robert Rector

== North Dakota ==
– Republican –

1. Betsy Dalrymple of Casselton
2. Ben Clayburgh of Grand Forks
3. Jackie Williams of Williston

== Ohio ==
– Republican

1. Spencer R. Raleigh
2. Joyce M. Houck
3. Betty Jo Sherman
4. Gary C. Suhadolnik
5. Randy Law
6. Leslie J. Spaeth of Mason. Former Warren County auditor and chairman of the Warren County Republican Party.
7. David Whipple Johnson
8. Robert S. Frost
9. Alex R. Arshinkoff
10. Phil A. Bowman
11. Jon Allison
12. Katharina Hooper
13. Pernel Jones, Sr.
14. Henry M. Butch O'Neill
15. William O. Dewitt, Jr.
16. Karyle Mumper
17. Owen V. Hall
18. Merom Brachman
19. J. Kirk Schuring
20. Billie Jean Fiore

== Oklahoma ==
– Republican

1. George W. Wiland, III
2. Paul R. Hollrah
3. M. Colby Schwartz
4. Diana Gunther
5. Ken Bartlett
6. Donald G. Burdick
7. Bob Hudspeth

== Oregon ==
– Democratic

1. Michael J. Bohan
2. Shirley A. Cairns
3. James L. Edmunson
4. Moshe D. Lenske
5. Meredith Wood Smith
6. Judy A. Sugnet
7. Paul F. Zastrow

== Pennsylvania ==
– Democratic

1. Lynne Abraham – District Attorney of Philadelphia
2. Richard W. Bloomingdale
3. Blondell Reynolds Brown – Philadelphia city councilwoman
4. Bob Casey Jr. – Pennsylvania Auditor General
5. Eileen Connelly
6. Bill DeWeese – Minority Leader of the Pennsylvania House of Representatives
7. Johnny Dougherty – Union Leader
8. Richard E. Filippi – Mayor of Erie
9. William M. George
10. Renee Gillinger – activist
11. Jennifer Mann – state representative
12. Bob Mellow – Minority Leader of the Pennsylvania Senate
13. Dan Onorato – Allegheny County Executive
14. Juan Ramos – Philadelphia city councilman
15. Stephen R. Reed – Mayor of Harrisburg
16. T. J. Rooney – state representative, Democratic Party chairman
17. Jonathan Saidel – Philadelphia City Controller
18. John F. Street – Mayor of Philadelphia
19. Rosemary Trump
20. Sala Udin – former Pittsburgh city councilman
21. Constance H. Williams – state senator

== Rhode Island ==
– Democratic

1. M. Teresa Paiva-Weed
2. Elizabeth Dennigan
3. John C. Lynch
4. Mark Weiner

== South Carolina ==
– Republican

1. Katon E. Dawson
2. Buddy Witherspoon
3. Wayland Moody
4. Thomas H. McLean
5. Brenda Bedenbaugh
6. Edwin Foulke
7. Robert A. Reagan
8. Drew McKissick

== South Dakota ==
– Republican –

1. Dennis Daugaard – Lieutenant Governor of South Dakota
2. Larry Long – Attorney General of South Dakota
3. Mike Rounds – Governor of South Dakota

== Tennessee ==
– Republican

1. Susan Anderson- Republican activist (7th District elector)
2. Betty Cannon – Tennessee Federation of Republican Women & Republican state executive committeewoman (5th District Elector)
3. Winfield Dunn – former governor of Tennessee 1971–1975 (at-large elector)
4. Geneva Williams Harrison – Blount County commissioner (2nd District elector)
5. Brock Hill – Mayor of Cumberland County (4th District elector)
6. Bruce Montgomery – Sheriff of Sevier County (1st District elector)
7. Claude Ramsey – Mayor of Hamilton County (3rd District elector)
8. Bob Rial – Dickson City councilman and Republican state executive committeeman (8th District elector)
9. John Ryder – Republican national committeeman (9th District elector)
10. Mark Tipps – Attorney and former chief of staff to Sen. Bill Frist (at-large elector)
11. Sally Wall – Republican activist (6th District elector)

== Texas ==
– Republican –

1. Royce Hayes of Flint, TX was an elector for Texas's 1st congressional district.
2. Tom Cotter of Baytown, TX was an elector for Texas's 2nd congressional district and was elected Secretary of the 2004 Texas Electoral College.
3. Jay Pierce of Garland, TX was an elector for Texas's 3rd congressional district.
4. Marjorie Chandler of Texarkana, TX was an elector for Texas's 4th congressional district.
5. Lance Lenz of Van, TX was an elector for Texas's 5th congressional district.
6. Barbara Grusendorf of Arlington, TX was an elector for Texas's 6th congressional district.
7. Bill Borden of Bellaire, TX was an elector for Texas's 7th congressional district.
8. Jim Wiggins of Conroe, TX was an elector for Texas's 8th congressional district.
9. Anna Rice of Houston, TX was an elector for Texas's 9th congressional district.
10. Jan Galbraith of Austin, TX was an elector for Texas's 10th congressional district.
11. Sue Brannon of Midland, TX was an elector for Texas's 11th congressional district.
12. Cheryl Surber of Fort Worth, TX was an elector for Texas's 12th congressional district.
13. Mike Ussery of Amarillo, TX was an elector for Texas's 13th congressional district.
14. Sid Young of Texas City, TX was an elector for Texas's 14th congressional district.
15. Frank Morris of Harlingen, TX was an elector for Texas's 15th congressional district.
16. Roger O'Dell of El Paso, TX was an elector for Texas's 16th congressional district.
17. Christopher DeCluitt of Waco, TX was an elector for Texas's 17th congressional district.
18. Martha Greenlaw of Houston, TX was an elector for Texas's 18th congressional district.
19. Marcus Anderson of Abilene, TX was an elector for Texas's 19th congressional district.
20. Mike Provost of San Antonio, TX was an elector for Texas's 20th congressional district.
21. Bennie Bock of New Braunfels, TX was an elector for Texas's 21st congressional district.
22. Kathy Haigler of Deer Park, TX was an elector for Texas's 22nd congressional district.
23. Kim Hesley of Pipe Creek, TX was an elector for Texas's 23rd congressional district.
24. Peter Wrench of Irving, TX was an elector for Texas's 24th congressional district.
25. Morris Woods of Austin, TX was an elector for Texas's 25th congressional district.
26. Rhealyn Samuelson of Denton, TX was an elector for Texas's 26th congressional district.
27. Nancy Stevens of Corpus Christi, TX was an elector for Texas's 27th congressional district.
28. Loyce McCarter of Lavernia, TX was an elector for Texas's 28th congressional district.
29. Larry Bowles of Houston, TX was an elector for Texas's 29th congressional district.
30. Dan Mosher of Dallas, TX was an elector for Texas's 30th congressional district.
31. Glenn Warren of Austin, TX was an elector for Texas's 31st congressional district.
32. Kristina Kiik of Richardson, TX was an elector for Texas's 32nd congressional district.
33. Susan Weddington of San Antonio, TX was an elector at large, and was elected Chairman of the 2004 Texas Electoral College.
34. Charles Burchett of Kirbyville, TX was an elector at large.

== Utah ==
– Republican

1. Olene S. Walker – Governor of Utah
2. Gayle McKeachnie – Lieutenant Governor of Utah
3. Lewis K. Billings – Mayor of Provo
4. Joseph A. Cannon – Chairman of the Utah Republican Party
5. Scott F. Simpson – Executive Director of the Utah Republican Party

== Vermont ==
– Democratic –

1. Billi Gosh of Brookfield.
2. Paul Highberg of Woodstock.
3. Jeffry Taylor of Clarendon.

== Virginia ==
– Republican

1. Yvonne McGee McCoy
2. Loretta H. Tate
3. Theodore C. Brown, Jr.
4. F. Woodrow Harris
5. Keith C. Drake
6. Wendell Walker
7. Peter E. Broadbent, Jr.
8. Sean Michael Spicer
9. Lloyd C. Martin
10. Dorothy L. Simpson
11. Carlton John Davis
12. Charles E. Dane
13. Rebecca Anne Stoeckel

== Washington ==
– Democratic

1. David W. Peterson
2. Mary F. Ervin
3. Valeria Ogden
4. Patsy Whitefoot
5. Larry Armstrong
6. Ken Bumgarner
7. Richard Kelley
8. Sarah Chandler
9. Greg Markley
10. Alan Johanson
11. Mary Z. Crosby

== West Virginia ==
– Republican

1. Rob Capehart
2. Doug McKinney
3. Dan Moore
4. Richie Robb
5. Larry Faircloth

== Wisconsin ==
– Democratic

1. Gail Gabrelian
2. Margaret McEntire
3. Jordan Franklin
4. Martha Toran
5. Jim Shinners
6. Jan Banicki
7. Daniel Hannula
8. Steve Mellenthin
9. Glenn Carlson
10. Linda Honold

== Wyoming ==
– Republican –

1. Linda Barker of Cheyenne.
2. Jack Van Mark of Torrington.
3. Mike Baker of Thermopolis.

Preceded by 2000	Electoral College (United States); 2004	Succeeded by 2008
