= Marovitz =

Marovitz is a surname. Notable people with the surname include:

- Abraham Lincoln Marovitz (1905–2001), American judge
- William A. Marovitz (born 1944), American lawyer and politician
