= List of 1996 United States presidential electors =

This is a list of electors (members of the Electoral College) who cast ballots to elect the President of the United States and Vice President of the United States in the 1996 presidential election. There are 538 electors from the 50 states and the District of Columbia. While every state except Nebraska and Maine chooses the electors by statewide vote, many states require that one elector be designated for each congressional district. Except where otherwise noted, such designations refer to the elector's residence in that district rather than election by the voters of the district.

== Alabama ==
All 9 of Alabama's electors voted for Bob Dole and Jack Kemp.

1. Bill Armistead
2. Pat Duncan
3. Glen Dunlap
4. Len Gavin
5. Henry King
6. Melba Peters
7. Don Sledge
8. Sam Steele
9. George G. Siebels Jr.

== Alaska ==
All 3 of Alaska's electors voted for Dole and Kemp.

1. Joan B. Clutts
2. Alyce Hanley
3. Bob Ward

== Arizona ==
All 8 of Arizona's electors voted for Bill Clinton and Al Gore.

1. Andrew S. Gordon
2. Rose Mofford
3. Scott Thomas Olson Sr.
4. Daniel R. Ortega Jr.
5. Jeanne P. Perpich
6. Mary V. Thomas
7. E. C. 'Polly' Rosenbaum
8. Thomas Bean

== Arkansas ==
All 6 of Arkansas's electors voted for Clinton and Gore.

1. Deborah Lee
2. L. T. Walker
3. Mary Jean Benett
4. Maurice Mitchell
5. Ann Henry
6. Merle F. Peterson

== California ==
All 54 of California's electors voted for Clinton and Gore.

1. Donald R. Alvarez
2. Dale K. Bankhead
3. Robert Batinovich
4. Beverly D. Braden
5. Carl Bryan
6. Lindsey D. Capps
7. Kathleen Clark
8. John M. Collins
9. Joshua L. Conaway
10. Jorge Covarrubias
11. Kim Carroll Cox
12. Theresa M. Duggan
13. Paul Eshoo
14. Timothy Farley
15. Carmen T. Garcia
16. Bob Glaser
17. Paul Goldenberg
18. Juana Gutierrez
19. Harold L. Halterman
20. Richard E. Holcomb
21. Stephen Kahn
22. Steven Kassel
23. Thomas J. Koch
24. Grace A. Koza
25. Hellen Lane
26. Francisco Leal
27. David C. Lizarraga
28. Ted Lumpkin
29. R. Keith McDonald
30. Paul F. Pelosi
31. Tom Pier
32. Sarah L. Reyes
33. Carol Shawn
34. Lane Sherman
35. Frances Skittone
36. Maureen Southwell
37. Jennifer A. Steen
38. Debra Stubblefield
39. John M. Taylor
40. Karen W. Titus
41. Jeffrey B. Towns
42. Lenore F. Wax
43. Jason Silva
44. Paul Barile
45. R. O. 'Bob' Davis
46. Richard L. Waldron
47. Guy C. Kimbrough
48. Sally J. Alexander
49. Tina L. Laine
50. Darity Wesley
51. John S. Laird
52. Nina Banuelos
53. Sandy Hester
54. Michael F. Bennet

== Colorado ==
All 8 of Colorado's electors voted for Dole and Kemp.

1. Ron Buxman
2. Mason Carpenter
3. Carley Johnson
4. Barbara McTurk
5. Natalie Meyer
6. Don Bain
7. Shannon Robinson
8. Kendall Sansing

== Connecticut ==
All 8 of Connecticut's electors voted for Clinton and Gore.

1. Frank L. Aieta
2. Dominic F. Balletto
3. Marjorie C. Bennett
4. Leo Canty
5. Fleeta Hudson
6. Hilda Santiago
7. Kenneth Slapin
8. John B. Larson

== Delaware ==
All 3 of Delaware's electors voted for Clinton and Gore.

1. Gary E. Hindes
2. Catherine J. Mancini
3. Samuel E. Lathem

== District of Columbia ==
All 3 of the District of Columbia's electors voted for Clinton and Gore.

1. Harry L. Thomas Sr.
2. Jeff Coudriet
3. Anne Westerfield Pitts

== Florida ==
All 25 of Florida's electors voted for Clinton and Gore.

1. Joseph Chapman III
2. Charles William Nelson
3. Ron LaFace
4. Adele Graham
5. Cynthia Y. Hall
6. George H. Sheldon
7. Richard Swann
8. Skeets Friedkin
9. Scott R. Falmlen
10. Pattie Lanier
11. Buddy Mackay Jr.
12. Bob A. Butterworth
13. Rudolph Parker
14. Terrie W. Brady
15. Jon Ausman
16. Cathy Bartolotti
17. Mitchell W. Berger
18. George Comerford
19. Joyce M. Cusack
20. Nancy M. Dick
21. Juanita Geathers
22. Diane Glasser
23. Gloria G. Jackson
24. Katherine C. Kelly
25. Marilyn Lenard

== Georgia ==
All 13 of Georgia's electors voted for Dole and Kemp.

1. Thomas J. Barnette
2. Dot Burns
3. Jeanne Ferst
4. Briggs A. Goggans
5. Camilla Moore
6. Brenda R. Lopez
7. Russell K. Paul
8. Oscar N. Persons
9. Alec Poitevint
10. John M. Stuckey Jr.
11. Stan Wise
12. Ray Wooldridge
13. Mack F. Mattingly

== Hawaii ==
All 4 of Hawaii's electors voted for Clinton and Gore.

1. Marsha R. Joyner
2. Robert Bunda
3. Joy Kobashigawa Lewis
4. R. Carolyn Wilcox

== Idaho ==
All 4 of Idaho's electors voted for Dole and Kemp.

1. Leora Day
2. Helen McKinney
3. Skip Smyser
4. John Sandy

== Illinois ==
All 22 of Illinois's electors voted for Clinton and Gore.

1. Addie C. Wyatt
2. Donald Pedro
3. Neomi Hernandez
4. Joan Brennan
5. Eileen Jackson
6. James Sheehan
7. William Marovitz
8. Ruth Jackson
9. Carolyn B. Hodge
10. John Nelson
11. Joe McGlaughlin
12. Jerry Sinclair
13. Patrick Thompson
14. Daniel M. Pierce
15. Shirley McCombs
16. Rose Marie Lipinski
17. James A. DeLeo
18. Marge Friedman
19. Dave Bybee
20. Kathryn Harvey
21. Mary Lou Kearns
22. Gary J. LaPaille

== Indiana ==
All 12 of Indiana's electors voted for Dole and Kemp.

1. Michael D. McDaniel
2. Barbara L. McClellan
3. Roger A. Chiabai
4. Virgil Scheidt
5. R. Wyatt Mick Jr.
6. Iris H. Clark
7. John R. Zentz
8. Robert L. Nelson
9. David C. Masten
10. Jim A. Kohlmeyer
11. Max A. Middendorf
12. John W. Sweezy

== Iowa ==
All 7 of Iowa's electors voted for Clinton and Gore.

1. Karl J. Rhomberg
2. Paul Swenson
3. Versal Vanordstrand
4. Jim Carnahan
5. Steve Mandernach
6. Patsy Ramacitti
7. Rich Pope

== Kansas ==
All 6 of Kansas's electors voted for Dole and Kemp.

1. Timothy Golba
2. Michael Harris
3. Betty Hanicke
4. Marynell Reece
5. Marjorie Robards
6. John Watkins

== Kentucky ==
All 8 of Kentucky's electors voted for Clinton and Gore.

1. Rodney Casada
2. Bremer Ehrler, ex-Secretary of State (1988-1992)
3. Sandra Frank
4. June Lyne, former state representative
5. Don McMillan
6. Gwen Meehan
7. George M. Plummer
8. Eldon Renaud
9. Winnie Townsend

== Louisiana ==
All 9 of Louisiana's electors voted for Clinton and Gore.

1. Ben L. Jeffers
2. Garland W. Webb
3. Stephanie R. Edwards
4. Henry A. Smith Jr.
5. Dorothy Huffman Wallace
6. Carla F. Chrisco
7. Bonnie P. Tynes
8. Mary Lou T. Winters
9. Mary E. Wisham

== Maine ==
All 4 of Maine's electors voted for Clinton and Gore.

1. Sharon McIntyre
2. Samuel D. Shapiro
3. Burt Wartell
4. Joseph Mayo

== Maryland ==
All 10 of Maryland's electors voted for Clinton and Gore.

1. Clarence W. Blount
2. Louis L. Goldstein
3. Harry R. Hughes
4. Katherine M. Jones
5. Dianne Madoni
6. Shelley Morhaim
7. Mary K. Prangley
8. Saul Stern
9. Irene C. Strieby
10. Marvin F. Wilson

== Massachusetts ==
All 12 of Massachusetts's electors voted for Clinton and Gore.

1. Barbara Travers
2. Mary K. O'Brien
3. Michael J. Whouley
4. Mark S. DiSalvo
5. John R. Doogan
6. Kevin A. Tarpley
7. William H. Bradley
8. Carol A. Donovan
9. Carol Ann Aloisi
10. Jovita Fontanez
11. Marc R. Pacheco
12. Mary J. Richards

== Michigan ==
All 18 of Michigan's electors voted for Clinton and Gore.

1. Freman Hendrix
2. Rosemary DiPonio
3. Richard Deneweth
4. Laurie A. Stupak
5. Beverly Barringer
6. Benjamin Harrison DeHart
7. Donald J. Mosher
8. James L. Sjoberg
9. Elijah Buxton, Jr.
10. Eleanor Tocco
11. Evelyn Zeidman
12. Julius A. Maddox
13. Vicki Metz Wagner
14. Owen Bieber
15. Tom Downs
16. George N. Andros
17. Debbie Dingell
18. Stephen Borrello

== Minnesota ==
All 10 of Minnesota's electors voted for Clinton and Gore.

1. Lance Peterson
2. Verna Lunz
3. Jackie Stevenson
4. Gladys Morton
5. Peggy Specktor
6. Opal Peterson
7. Lorraine Cecil
8. George Hunter
9. Marlene Kayser
10. John C. Massmann

== Mississippi ==
All 7 of Mississippi's electors voted for Dole and Kemp.

1. Bob Anthony
2. J. L. Holloway
3. Larry Homan
4. Charles Irby
5. Robert Kane
6. John McCarty
7. Lois Robertson

== Missouri ==
All 11 of Missouri's electors voted for Clinton and Gore.

1. Connie Johnson
2. Carole Gambino
3. Linda Schilly
4. Willard Reine
5. Virgil Troutwine
6. Bob Staton
7. Steve Stepp
8. Shirla Howard
9. H. E. 'Scat' Davis
10. Nancy Reynolds
11. Robert Wheeler

== Montana ==
All 3 of Montana's electors voted for Dole and Kemp.

1. Ada Nash
2. Archie Lucht
3. Jack Galt

== Nebraska ==
All 5 of Nebraska's electors voted for Dole and Kemp.

1. Hal Daub Jr.
2. Alice Dittman
3. Joyce Schram
4. Dawyn Otto
5. Charles Sigerson

== Nevada ==
All 4 of Nevada's electors voted for Clinton and Gore.

1. Douglas Bache
2. Virginia Cain
3. Marie Ripps
4. Charles Waterman

== New Hampshire ==
All 4 of New Hampshire's electors voted for Clinton and Gore.

1. Joseph F. Keefe
2. Jeanne Shaheen
3. Pat Russell
4. Edward E. Shumaker III

== New Jersey ==
All 15 of New Jersey's electors voted for Clinton and Gore.

1. Reni Erdos
2. David Fernandez
3. Henry Gallo
4. Thomas S. Higgins
5. Lynne B. Hurwitz
6. Karen J. Kominsky
7. Jean A. Holtz
8. David S. Steiner
9. Philip Thigpen
10. Susan Wilson
11. Stephen S. Weinstein
12. Nicholas de B. Katzenbach
13. Zulima V. Farber
14. Thomas P. Giblin
15. Susan Bass Levin

== New Mexico ==
All 5 of New Mexico's electors voted for Clinton and Gore.

1. Bruce King
2. Stephanie Gonzales
3. Manuel Sanchez
4. Fannie Atcitty
5. Sheryl Williams

== New York ==
All 33 of New York's electors voted for Clinton and Gore.

1. Kathryn B. Mackey
2. Gerard J. Sweeney
3. Stanley Kalmon Schlein
4. Elizabeth Velez
5. Michael H. Reich
6. Ann M. Galante
7. Raymond B. Harding
8. Paul F. Cole
9. Frances L. Reiter
10. John Sullivan
11. G. Steven Pigeon
12. Victor A. Kovner
13. Edward F. Draves
14. Esther Kate Fiore
15. Denise W. King
16. Alberta M. Madonna
17. Mary C. Paladino
18. H. Carl McCall
19. Jeffrey C. Feldman
20. Michael J. Bragman
21. Thomas A. Fink
22. Deborah J. Glick
23. Denny Farrell
24. Sheldon Silver
25. Audrey I. Pheffer
26. Marcella Maxwell
27. Martin Connor
28. Inez E. Dickens
29. Judith H. Hope
30. Helen M. Marshall
31. Paula Redd Zeman
32. Leonard A. Weiss
33. Dominic J. Baranello

== North Carolina ==
All 14 of North Carolina's electors voted for Dole and Kemp.

1. Howard B. Smith
2. Bettie West
3. J. D. Teachey
4. Nelson Dollar
5. Lee Q. McMillan
6. Carolyn McGee
7. Jim Cole
8. Tom Dwiggins
9. John Van Hanford
10. Gary Whitener
11. George Alexander Jones
12. Quentine Finch
13. Bill Graham
14. Dorothy Bursey

== North Dakota ==
All 3 of North Dakota's electors voted for Dole and Kemp.

1. Vernon E. Wagner
2. Robert Peterson
3. Earl Strinden

== Ohio ==
All 21 of Ohio's electors voted for Clinton and Gore.

1. Catherine Barrett
2. John C. Myers
3. Mary A. Briggs
4. John H. Schuler
5. Barbara K. Myers
6. David E. Giese
7. Cecilia Huffman
8. Nathaniel R. Hodoh
9. Dennis Lieberman
10. William Anthony Jr.
11. Frances Alberty
12. Socrates Space
13. Margaret Kearsey
14. William A. Burga
15. Timothy Barnhart
16. Enid Goubeaux
17. Dan Martin
18. Michael Morley
19. Regina Rollins
20. Jack Sizemore
21. William Sundermeyer

== Oklahoma ==
All 8 of Oklahoma's electors voted for Dole and Kemp.

1. Gary W. Banz
2. J. Michael Brown
3. Dixie I. Galloway
4. Steven F. Garrett
5. Skip Healey
6. Leo F. Herlacher
7. Dale N. Switzer
8. Paul E. Thornbrugh

== Oregon ==
All 7 of Oregon's electors voted for Clinton and Gore.

1. Jeannie Dodson-Edgars
2. John McFadden
3. Linda Johnson
4. J. Marc Abrams
5. Margaret Carter
6. Michael Graham
7. Valerie Payne

== Pennsylvania ==
All 23 of Pennsylvania's electors voted for Clinton and Gore.

1. William Titelman
2. Robert A. Brady
3. Michael M. Dawida
4. Judy Lynch
5. Alba E. Martinez
6. Robert J. Mellow
7. Lazar M. Palnick
8. Tom Muphy
9. Leslie Reid Price
10. Anna Cibotti Verna
11. William M. George
12. John F. Street
13. Lisa M. Boscola
14. Sophie Masloff
15. Thomas A. Leonard
16. David J. Gondak
17. Valerie McDonald Roberts
18. Joanne Olszewski
19. Evelyn Rafalko-McNulty
20. Mark S. Singel
21. Marian B. Tasco
22. Ivan Itkin
23. Catherine Baker Knoll

== Rhode Island ==
All 4 of Rhode Island's electors voted for Clinton and Gore.

1. Muriel A. Evans
2. Cristine McBurney
3. Joseph Muschiano
4. Robert Riesman

== South Carolina ==
All 8 of South Carolina's electors voted for Dole and Kemp.

1. Elizabeth G. Cox
2. Thomas H. McLean
3. Lonnie Rowell
4. Michael F. Davis
5. Cynthia F. Costa
6. Daniel A. Richardson Sr.
7. Walter P. Witherspoon
8. Bob Taylor

== South Dakota ==
All 3 of South Dakota's electors voted for Dole and Kemp.

1. Joel Rosenthal
2. Carole Boos
3. William J. Janklow

== Tennessee ==
All 11 of Tennessee's electors voted for Clinton and Gore.

1. Jane G. Eskind
2. Gwen Fleming
3. Ned McWherter
4. Olan Mills II
5. William N. Morris
6. Harold G. Woods
7. Harlan Mathews
8. Dorothy Crook
9. M. Inez Crutchfield
10. Benjamin L. Hooks
11. Anna Belle O'Brien

== Texas ==
All 32 of Texas's electors voted for Dole and Kemp.

1. Evelyn Collins
2. Joel Franke
3. Jean Bensmiller
4. Ben G. Raimer
5. David Thackston
6. Kay Copeland
7. Tonna Trumble
8. David Husband
9. M. A. Taylor
10. Nelda Eppes
11. Marian Faye Crossley
12. James Garvey
13. James E. Brandon
14. Doraline Daeley
15. Clint Inmon
16. Zeb D. Alford
17. Don Truman
18. Jonathan Gurwitz
19. Eric Thode
20. Michael Dugas
21. Leland Kirby
22. Melvin McCoy
23. Sarah McDougal
24. Charles D. Johnson
25. Melvin Cowart
26. Tina Hardcastle
27. Arthur Granado
28. Narciso V. Mendoza
29. Donna Peterson
30. Greg Davidson
31. Martin Daneman
32. Frank J. Corte Jr.

== Utah ==
All 5 of Utah's electors voted for Dole and Kemp.

1. Joseph Cannon
2. Olene S. Walker
3. Arlene Ellis
4. Christopher B. Cannon
5. Michael O. Leavitt

== Vermont ==
All 3 of Vermont's electors voted for Clinton and Gore.

1. Pat Barr
2. Michael J. Obuchowski
3. Carolyn Nissen

== Virginia ==
All 13 of Virginia's electors voted for Dole and Kemp.

1. Hugh D. Key
2. Robert R. Fountain
3. Gary C. Byler
4. Mary A. Braswell
5. Patricia Strawn Bice
6. Michael W. D. Brown
7. Mark D. Franko
8. Frank O. Meeks
9. Ruth Aileen Hancock
10. Vincent A. DiBenedetto III
11. Elaine Nunez McConnell
12. Anne R. Keast
13. Marilyn L. Lussen

== Washington ==
All 11 of Washington's electors voted for Clinton and Gore.

1. Nancy Rust
2. Leora Province
3. Mike Barr
4. Barbara McFarlin-Kosiec
5. Claude Brewer
6. Nancy Pease Hogan
7. Ray Naugle
8. Doreen Cato
9. Joe Nilsson
10. Jody Buckley
11. John Thompson

== West Virginia ==
All 5 of West Virginia's electors voted for Clinton and Gore.

1. Barbara Evans Fleischauer
2. Daniel P. Lutz
3. Sarah Lee Neal
4. Rebecca I. White
5. Violet Midkiff

== Wisconsin ==
All 11 of Wisconsin's electors voted for Clinton and Gore.

1. Karen Sostarich
2. Melissa Schroeder
3. Robert Friebert
4. Martha Love
5. Rosemarie McDowell
6. Mala McGhee
7. Sue Miller
8. Jeffrey Neubauer
9. Robert Schweder
10. Heidi Schwoch
11. Douglas Oitzinger

== Wyoming ==
All 3 of Wyoming's electors voted for Dole and Kemp.

1. Becky Constantino
2. Lorraine Quarberg
3. Jim Geringer

Preceded by 1992	Electoral College (United States); 1996	Succeeded by 2000
