= Judge Miner =

Judge Miner may refer to:

- Julius Howard Miner (1896–1963), judge of the United States District Court for the Northern District of Illinois
- Roger Miner (1934–2012), judge of the United States Court of Appeals for the Second Circuit
