= Hibbler =

Hibbler is a surname. Notable people with the surname include:

- Al Hibbler (1915–2001), American baritone vocalist
- William J. Hibbler (1946–2012), American judge
