= James Alesia =

American judge (1934–2003)

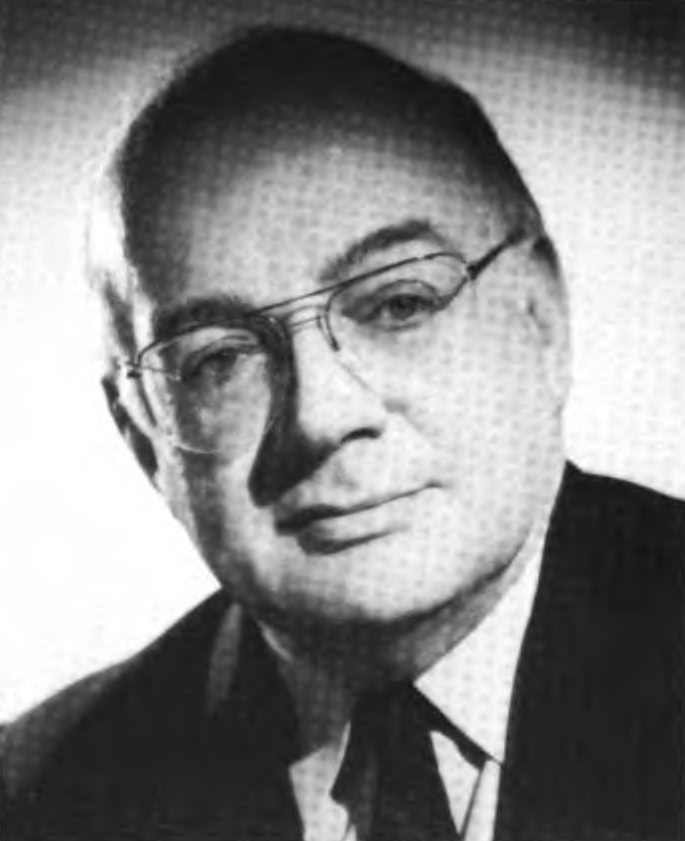

Senior Judge of the United States District Court for the Northern District of Illinois
- In office 1 February 1998 – 24 July 2003

Judge of the United States District Court for the Northern District of Illinois
- In office 20 May 1987 – 1 February 1998
- Appointed by: Ronald Reagan
- Preceded by: George N. Leighton
- Succeeded by: William J. Hibbler

Personal details
- Born: James Henry Alesia; July 16, 1934 Chicago, Illinois
- Died: July 24, 2003 (aged 69) Chicago, Illinois
- Education: Loyola University Chicago (B.S.); Chicago-Kent College of Law (J.D.)

James Henry Alesia (16 July 1934 – 24 July 2003) was a United States district judge of the United States District Court for the Northern District of Illinois.

== Education and career ==
Born in Chicago, Illinois, Alesia received a Bachelor of Science from Loyola University Chicago in 1956 and a Juris Doctor from Chicago-Kent College of Law in 1960. While attending law school, Alesia worked as a Chicago police officer. He was in private practice in Chicago Heights from 1960 to 1963, and was then an attorney for the Chicago and North Western Transportation Company from 1963 to 1970, returning to private practice in Minneapolis, Minnesota from 1970 to 1971. He was an Assistant United States Attorney of the Northern District of Illinois from 1971 to 1973. He was trial counsel to the Chessie System in 1973. He was an Administrative Law Judge for the United States Department of Health and Human Services, Social Security Administration from 1973 to 1980, and for the Occupational Safety and Health Review Commission from 1980 to 1982. He then returned to private practice in Chicago, from 1982 to 1987.

== Federal judicial service ==
On 2 February 1987, Alesia was nominated by President Ronald Reagan to a seat on the United States District Court for the Northern District of Illinois vacated by George N. Leighton. Alesia was confirmed by the United States Senate on 19 May 1987, and received his commission on 20 May 1987. He assumed senior status due to a certified disability on 1 February 1998, serving in that capacity until his death of a heart attack, in Chicago.

== Sources ==
Legal offices
Preceded by George N. Leighton	Judge of the United States District Court for the Northern District of Illinois; 1987–1998	Succeeded by William J. Hibbler
