= Andrea Wood =

American judge (born 1973)

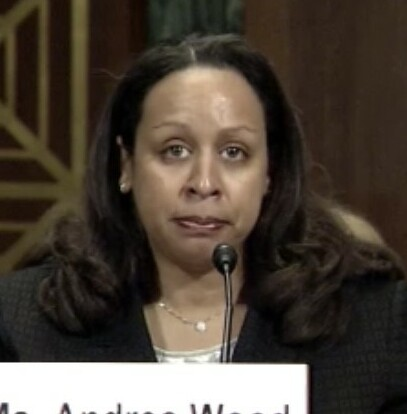
- Wood in 2013

Judge of the United States District Court for the Northern District of Illinois
- Incumbent
- Assumed office October 15, 2013
- Appointed by: Barack Obama
- Preceded by: William J. Hibbler

Personal details
- Born: March 2, 1973 (age 53) St. Louis, Missouri, U.S.
- Education: University of Chicago (BA); Yale University (JD)

Andrea Robin Wood (born March 2, 1973) is an American attorney serving as a United States district judge of the United States District Court for the Northern District of Illinois.

== Early life and education ==
Wood was born March 2, 1973, in St. Louis, Missouri. She received a Bachelor of Arts degree from the University of Chicago in 1995 and a Juris Doctor in 1998 from Yale Law School.

== Career ==
Wood served as a law clerk to Judge Diane Wood of the United States Court of Appeals for the Seventh Circuit from 1998 to 1999. From 1999 to 2004, she worked as an associate at the law firm of Kirkland & Ellis, where she was responsible for litigation, primarily in federal court. In 2004, she became a senior attorney at the U.S. Securities and Exchange Commission, where she managed complex investigations and litigation involving securities law. In 2007, she became senior trial counsel in the Division of Enforcement, serving until her appointment to the bench in 2013.

=== Federal judicial service ===
On May 6, 2013, President Barack Obama nominated Wood to serve as a United States district judge of the United States District Court for the Northern District of Illinois, to fill the vacancy left by Judge William J. Hibbler, who died on March 19, 2012. She received a hearing before the Senate Judiciary Committee on June 19, 2013. On July 18, 2013, her nomination was reported out of committee by voice vote. The United States Senate confirmed her nomination on October 14, 2013 by voice vote. She received her commission on October 15, 2013. At the time she was sworn in, she was the youngest United States district court judge.

== See also ==
- List of African-American federal judges
- List of African-American jurists

Legal offices
Preceded by William J. Hibbler	Judge of the United States District Court for the Northern District of Illinois; 2013–present	Incumbent
