= Judy Reardon =

American politician (1958–2022)

Member of the New Hampshire House of Representatives
- In office 1984–1988
- Constituency: Hillsborough 37

Personal details
- Born: February 12, 1958 Manchester, New Hampshire
- Died: December 16, 2022 (aged 64)
- Party: Democratic
- Relations: Patricia Cornell (sister)

Judy Reardon (February 12, 1958 – December 16, 2022) is an American politician from New Hampshire. She served in the New Hampshire House of Representatives.

She was a long-term staffer to Senator Jeanne Shaheen. Her sister Patricia Cornell was also a state representative.

Reardon was a Democrat elector for John Kerry in the 2004 United States presidential election. Reardon was the New Hampshire Public Affairs Director for Planned Parenthood of Northern New England.

Reardon endorsed Kirsten Gillibrand in the 2020 United States presidential election.
