= Mary Messier =

Member of the Rhode Island House of Representatives

Member of the Rhode Island House of Representatives from the 62nd district
- Incumbent
- Assumed office December 2009
- Preceded by: Elizabeth Dennigan

Personal details
- Born: June 27, 1952 (age 74)
- Party: Democratic
- Education: Roger Williams University; Rhode Island College

Mary Duffy Messier (born June 27, 1952) is an American politician and a Democratic member of the Rhode Island House of Representatives representing District 62 since her December 2009 special election to fill the vacancy caused by the resignation of Representative Elizabeth Dennigan.

== Education ==
Messier earned her BA degree from Roger Williams University, and her MEd from Rhode Island College.

== Elections ==
- 2012 Messier was unopposed for both the September 11, 2012 Democratic Primary, winning with 1,075 votes and the November 6, 2012 General election, winning with 4,149 votes.
- 2010 Messier was unopposed for the September 23, 2010 Democratic Primary, winning with 1,488 votes and won the November 2, 2010 General election with 2,615 votes (68.3%) against Republican nominee Thomas Clupny.
