= List of 1992 United States presidential electors =

1992 presidential electors

This list of 1992 United States presidential electors contains members of the Electoral College, known as "electors", who cast ballots to elect the president of the United States and vice president of the United States in the 1992 presidential election. There are 538 electors from the 50 states and the District of Columbia.

The members of the 1992 Electoral College met on December 14, 1992, the Tuesday after the second Wednesday in December. Arkansas Governor Bill Clinton and Senator Al Gore received 370 electoral college votes. President George Bush and Vice President Dan Quayle received 168 votes. Independent Ross Perot did not receive any electoral college votes despite earning nearly 19% of the popular vote.

While every state except Nebraska and Maine chooses the electors by statewide vote, many states require that one elector be designated for each congressional district. These electors are chosen by each party before the general elections. A vote for that party then confirms their position. In all states except Nebraska and Maine, each state's electors are winner-take-all. In Maine and Nebraska within each congressional district one elector is allocated by popular vote – the states' remaining two electors (representing the two U.S. Senate seats) are winner-take-both. Except where otherwise noted, such designations refer to the elector's residence in that district rather than election by the voters of the district.

== Alabama ==
Electors 9: Pledged to George Bush and Dan Quayle

== Alaska ==
Electors 3: Pledged to George Bush and Dan Quayle

== Arizona ==
Electors 8: Pledged to George Bush and Dan Quayle

== Arkansas ==
Electors 6: Pledged to Bill Clinton and Al Gore

== California ==
Electors 54: Pledged to Bill Clinton and Al Gore

== Colorado ==
Electors 8: Pledged to Bill Clinton and Al Gore

- Howard Gelt, Colorado Democratic Party chair
- Mary Beth Corsentino of Pueblo
- Irene Kornelly of Colorado Springs
- John Castellano of Denver
- William Bertschy of Fort Collins
- Adam Dempsey of Aurora
- George Morgan of Golden
- Douglas Schroeder of Northglenn

== Connecticut ==
Electors 8: Pledged to Bill Clinton and Al Gore

== Delaware ==
Electors 3: Pledged to Bill Clinton and Al Gore

== District of Columbia ==
Electors 3: Pledged to Bill Clinton and Al Gore

== Florida ==
Electors 25: Pledged to George Bush and Dan Quayle

== Georgia ==
Electors 13: Pledged to Bill Clinton and Al Gore

== Hawaii ==
Electors 4: Pledged to Bill Clinton and Al Gore

== Idaho ==
Electors 4: Pledged to George Bush and Dan Quayle

== Illinois ==
Electors 22: Pledged to Bill Clinton and Al Gore

== Indiana ==
Electors 12: Pledged to George Bush and Dan Quayle

== Iowa ==
Electors 7: Pledged to Bill Clinton and Al Gore

== Kansas ==
Electors 6: Pledged to George Bush and Dan Quayle

== Kentucky ==
Electors 8: Pledged to Bill Clinton and Al Gore

== Louisiana ==
Electors 9: Pledged to Bill Clinton and Al Gore

== Maine ==
Electors 4: Pledged to Bill Clinton and Al Gore

== Maryland ==
Electors 10: Pledged to Bill Clinton and Al Gore

- William B. Abrecht
- Jessie Jo Bowen
- Wayne Clark
- Marie Dyson
- Leonard Kligman
- Brenda Lipitz
- Kathleen Kennedy Townsend
- Nancy Voss
- Agnes Welch
- John T. Willis

== Massachusetts ==
Electors 12: Pledged to Bill Clinton and Al Gore

== Michigan ==
Electors 18: Pledged to Bill Clinton and Al Gore

== Minnesota ==
Electors 10: Pledged to Bill Clinton and Al Gore

== Mississippi ==
Electors 7: Pledged to George Bush and Dan Quayle

== Missouri ==
Electors 11: Pledged to Bill Clinton and Al Gore

== Montana ==
Electors 3: Pledged to Bill Clinton and Al Gore

== Nebraska ==
Electors 5: Pledged to George Bush and Dan Quayle

== Nevada ==
Electors 4: Pledged to Bill Clinton and Al Gore

== New Hampshire ==
Electors 4: Pledged to Bill Clinton and Al Gore

== New Jersey ==
Electors 15: Pledged to Bill Clinton and Al Gore

== New Mexico ==
Electors 5: Pledged to Bill Clinton and Al Gore

== New York ==
Electors 33: Pledged to Bill Clinton and Al Gore

== North Carolina ==
Electors 14: Pledged to George Bush and Dan Quayle

== North Dakota ==
Electors 3: Pledged to George Bush and Dan Quayle

== Ohio ==
Electors 21: Pledged to Bill Clinton and Al Gore

- Diane Johnson
- Thomas Chandler
- M.K. Maue
- Dan Martin
- David E. Giese
- Enos Singer
- Barbara Martin
- Gary Elsass.
- Stephanie Madden
- Ron Mottl
- Minnetta Savage
- John T. Greene
- Marry Briggs
- Nancy R. Treichler
- Michael Sinziano
- Henry Yoder
- Linda O'Brien-Bodnar
- Ruby Gilliam
- Margaret Kearsey
- Lee Fisher
- Mary Ellen Withrow

== Oklahoma ==
Electors 8: Pledged to George Bush and Dan Quayle

== Oregon ==
Electors 7: Pledged to Bill Clinton and Al Gore

== Pennsylvania ==
Electors 23: Pledged to Bill Clinton and Al Gore

== Rhode Island ==
Electors 4: Pledged to Bill Clinton and Al Gore

== South Carolina ==
Electors 8: Pledged to George Bush and Dan Quayle

== South Dakota ==
Electors 3: Pledged to George Bush and Dan Quayle

== Tennessee ==
Electors 11: Pledged to Bill Clinton and Al Gore

== Texas ==
Electors 32: Pledged to George Bush and Dan Quayle

== Utah ==
Electors 5: Pledged to George Bush and Dan Quayle

== Vermont ==
Electors 3: Pledged to Bill Clinton and Al Gore

== Virginia ==
Electors 13: Pledged to George Bush and Dan Quayle

- Phyllis L. Allen
- Gary C. Byler
- Margaret M. Nixsen
- Armistead Jones
- Samuel L. Ranson
- Frances Vaughan Garland
- James C. Wheat III
- Belden Hill Bell
- V. Ray Hancock
- Steven D. Whitener
- Barboura G. Raesly
- William Henry Hurd
- Thomasina Jordan

== Washington ==
Electors 11: Pledged to Bill Clinton and Al Gore

== West Virginia ==
Electors 5: Pledged to Bill Clinton and Al Gore

== Wisconsin ==
Electors 11: Pledged to Bill Clinton and Al Gore

== Wyoming ==
Electors 3: Pledged to George Bush and Dan Quayle

== See also ==
- Ballotpedia
- Federalist Papers

Preceded by 1988	Electoral College (United States); 1992	Succeeded by 1996
