= Abraham Lincoln Marovitz =

American judge (1905–2001)

Senior Judge of the United States District Court for the Northern District of Illinois
- In office August 10, 1975 – March 17, 2001

Judge of the United States District Court for the Northern District of Illinois
- In office October 2, 1963 – August 10, 1975
- Appointed by: John F. Kennedy
- Preceded by: Julius Howard Miner
- Succeeded by: George N. Leighton

Judge of the Superior Court of Cook County
- In office 1950–1963

Personal details
- Born: Abraham Lincoln Marovitz; August 10, 1905 Oshkosh, Wisconsin, United States
- Died: March 17, 2001 (aged 95) Chicago, Illinois, United States
- Party: Democratic
- Relatives: William A. Marovitz (nephew)
- Education: Chicago-Kent College of Law (LL.B.)

Abraham Lincoln Marovitz (August 10, 1905 – March 17, 2001) was a United States district judge of the United States District Court for the Northern District of Illinois.

== Early life and career ==
Born on August 10, 1905, in Oshkosh, Wisconsin, to Orthodox Jewish parents who were Lithuanian immigrants, Marovitz grew up in the Maxwell Street area of Chicago, Illinois, after his parents moved to Chicago in 1910. Marovitz spent his youth selling newspapers, delivering groceries and prizefighting. As a teenager, he also worked as an office boy for a law firm, where a partner encouraged him to attend law school (and agreed to fund his tuition), even though Marovitz did not have a college degree. "In those days, you didn't need a college degree to go to law school," Marovitz later said. "So that's how I wound up the only sitting federal judge who never went to college." Marovitz earned a Bachelor of Laws from Chicago-Kent College of Law in 1925 at the age of 19, and he was at that point still 20 months too young to sit for the Illinois bar exam, which required all test-takers to be 21 years old. Marovitz took the exam when he turned 21, and passed it on his first try. From 1927 until 1933, Marovitz was an assistant state's attorney in Cook County, Illinois. He then worked in private legal practice in Chicago with his brothers, Harold and Sydney, from 1933 until 1950.

== Illinois Senate ==
Marovitz was an elected member of the Illinois Senate from 1939 until 1950, becoming Illinois' first-ever Jewish state senator. He was a Democrat. During World War II, Marovitz waived his deferment and enlisted in the United States Marine Corps. He was honorably discharged in May 1945 as a sergeant major.

When Corneal A. Davis first arrived in Springfield, Illinois, Davis was turned away from the hotel and resorted to staying at the train station. In protest, Marovitz joined Davis at the train station.

== Judicial service ==
In 1950, Marovitz became a judge on the Superior Court of Cook County. He served as a Superior Court judge until his appointment to the federal bench in 1963, serving as Chief Judge of the Cook County Criminal Court from 1958 to 1959

Marovitz was nominated by President John F. Kennedy on July 16, 1963, to a seat on the United States District Court for the Northern District of Illinois vacated by Judge Julius H. Miner. He was confirmed by the United States Senate on September 25, 1963, and received his commission on October 2, 1963. He assumed senior status on August 10, 1975, his 70th birthday. His service terminated on March 17, 2001, due to his death.

== Personal life ==
Marovitz never married. One of his nephews, William A. Marovitz, later became an Illinois state senator himself and was married to Playboy Enterprises chief executive officer Christie Hefner.

== Death and legacy ==
In 1995, Marovitz received the Chicago History Museum "Making History Award" for Distinction in Public Service. Marovitz died on March 17, 2001, of kidney failure at his home on Chicago's North Side. In 2003, Marovitz's estate donated his papers to the Richard J. Daley Library at the University of Illinois at Chicago. In 2003, Chicago–Kent College of Law began "The Honorable Abraham Lincoln Marovitz Public Interest Law Award", an award intended to recognize alumni who have demonstrated outstanding public interest. Recipients include the inaugural class of Jed Stone and Thu Tran, as well as Pablo Almaguer.

== See also ==
- List of Jewish American jurists

== Sources ==
Legal offices
Preceded by Julius Howard Miner	Judge of the United States District Court for the Northern District of Illinois; 1963–1975	Succeeded by George N. Leighton
