= Patricia Cornell =

American politician

Member of the New Hampshire House of Representatives from the Hillsborough 22nd district
- Incumbent
- Assumed office December 7, 2022
- Succeeded by: Greg Erskine (elect)

Member of the New Hampshire House of Representatives from the Hillsborough 18th district
- In office December 3, 2014 – December 7, 2022

Personal details
- Party: Democratic
- Relations: Judy Reardon (sister)

Patricia Cornell is an American politician. She serves as a Democratic member for the Hillsborough 22nd district of the New Hampshire House of Representatives.
