= John P. Barnes =

American judge (1881–1959)

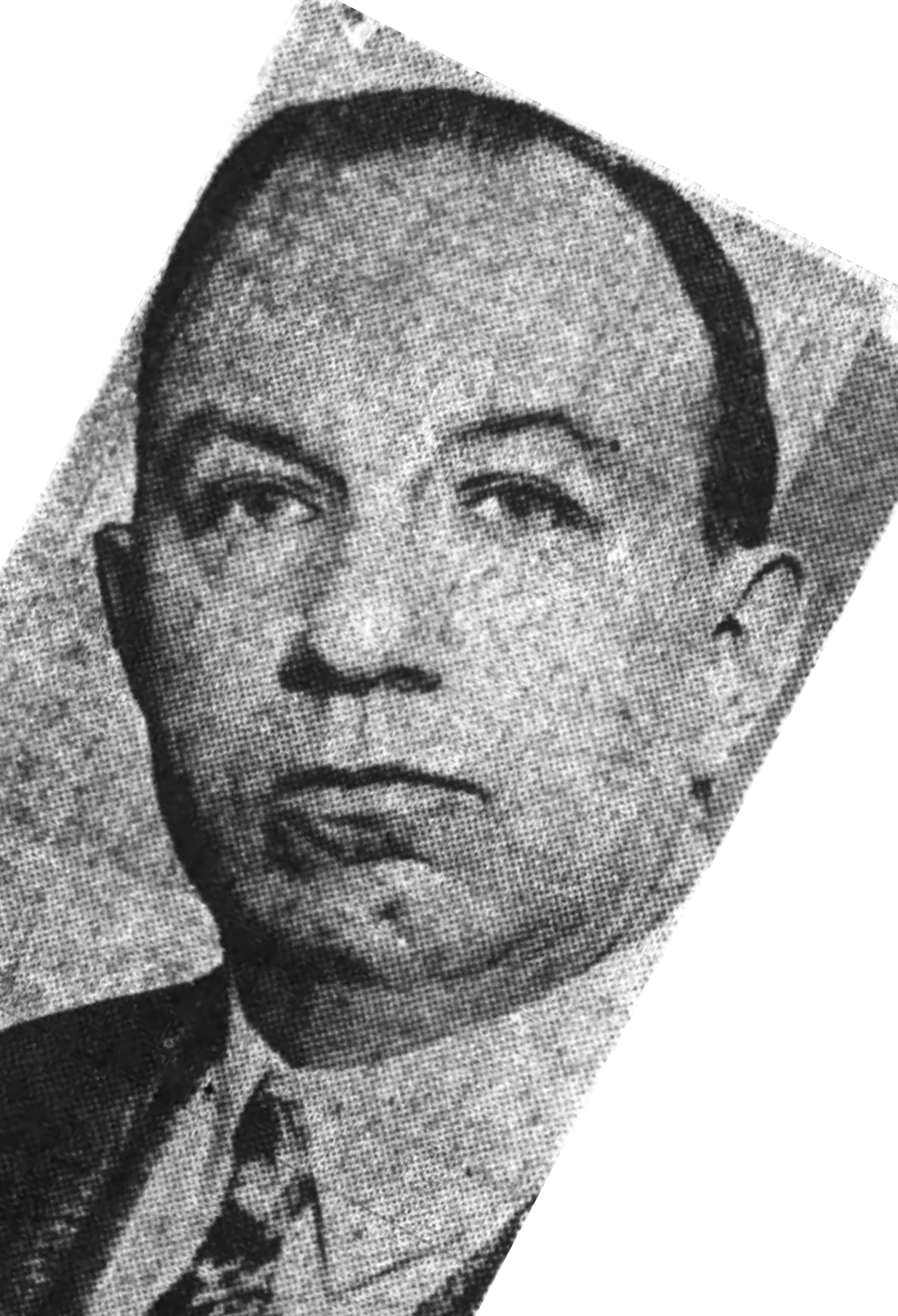

Senior Judge of the United States District Court for the Northern District of Illinois
- In office September 15, 1957 – December 31, 1958

Chief Judge of the United States District Court for the Northern District of Illinois
- In office 1948–1957
- Preceded by: Office established
- Succeeded by: Philip Leo Sullivan

Judge of the United States District Court for the Northern District of Illinois
- In office March 4, 1931 – September 15, 1957
- Appointed by: Herbert Hoover
- Preceded by: Seat established by 46 Stat. 1417
- Succeeded by: Julius Howard Miner

Personal details
- Born: John Peter Barnes; March 15, 1881 Beaver County, Pennsylvania
- Died: April 10, 1959 (aged 78) Elgin, Illinois
- Education: Geneva College (B.S.); University of Michigan Law School (LL.B.)

John Peter Barnes (March 15, 1881 – April 10, 1959) was a United States district judge of the United States District Court for the Northern District of Illinois.

== Education and career ==
Born in Beaver County, Pennsylvania, Barnes received a Bachelor of Science degree from Geneva College in 1904 and a Bachelor of Laws from the University of Michigan Law School in 1907. He was in private practice in Chicago, Illinois from 1907 to 1913. He was a first assistant county attorney of Cook County, Illinois from 1913 to 1914, thereafter returning to his private practice until 1931.

== Federal judicial service ==
On February 26, 1931, Barnes was nominated by President Herbert Hoover to a new seat on the United States District Court for the Northern District of Illinois created by 46 Stat. 1417. He was confirmed by the United States Senate on March 2, 1931, and received his commission on March 4, 1931. He served as Chief Judge from 1948 to 1957, assuming senior status on September 15, 1957, and resigning the bench altogether on December 31, 1958.

== Last years and death ==
Barnes was also a Basset Hound breeder, and was co-owner of Barook Kennels from 1957 until his death on April 10, 1959, in Elgin, Illinois.

Legal offices
Preceded by Position established	Judge of the United States District Court for the Northern District of Illinois; 1931–1957	Succeeded by Julius Howard Miner
Preceded by Position established	Chief Judge of the United States District Court for the Northern District of Illinois; 1948–1957	Succeeded by Philip Leo Sullivan
