= George N. Leighton =

American judge of Cape Verdean descent

Senior Judge of the United States District Court for the Northern District of Illinois
- In office February 27, 1986 – December 1, 1987

Judge of the United States District Court for the Northern District of Illinois
- In office February 4, 1976 – February 27, 1986
- Appointed by: Gerald Ford
- Preceded by: Abraham Lincoln Marovitz
- Succeeded by: James Alesia

Personal details
- Born: George Neves Leitão; October 22, 1912 New Bedford, Massachusetts, U.S.
- Died: June 6, 2018 (aged 105) Brockton, Massachusetts, U.S.
- Resting place: Arlington National Cemetery
- Party: Democratic Party
- Spouse: Virginia Berry Quivers
- Children: 2
- Education: Howard University (A.B.); Harvard Law School (LL.B.)

George Neves Leighton (born George Neves Leitão; October 22, 1912 – June 6, 2018) was an American judge who served as a United States district judge of the United States District Court for the Northern District of Illinois. He was known for taking cases related to housing, voting, and jury service, especially if these cases were directly impacted by injustice, particularly racism.

== Early life ==
George Neves Leitão and his twin sister Georgina were born in New Bedford, Massachusetts on October 22, 1912, to Ana Silva Garcia and António Neves Leitão, immigrants from Brava, Cape Verde. At home, the family spoke Crioulo. His surname was anglicized to "Leighton" after a teacher claimed she could not pronounce his last name "Leitão." Leighton left school after sixth grade to work with his father picking cranberries, strawberries, and blueberries. He also worked on an oil tanker that sailed from Fall River, Massachusetts to Aruba. He read voraciously throughout his late childhood and began attending night school through the Works Progress Administration starting in 1934 to make up for his lack of diploma.

== Education and military ==
In 1936, Leighton won $200 from the Cape Verdean Memorial Scholarship Fund and applied to Howard University. He was initially rejected, but F.D. Wilkinson, the school's registrar, agreed to let him enroll as a non-degree student, and that if he could prove he could succeed without a high school education, the university would change his status to degree-seeking. To further complicate matters, Leighton recalls having a poor grasp on the English language before attending Howard. Despite this, he made the Dean's List during his first semester and was made a candidate for degree. He remained on the Dean's List every semester until he graduated magna cum laude with a bachelor's in history in 1940. While at Howard, one of his Kappa Alpha Psi brothers recommended him for the position of the Assistant to the Dean of Men, which gave him free housing and tuition. He was also inducted into Phi Beta Kappa and earned a commission from Howard's AROTC. James McCauley Landis, the Dean of Harvard Law School, granted him a first-year scholarship and admitted him.

World War II began in his second year and he was sent to Fort Benning in Georgia in March 1942. At the end of basic, he was sent to Fort Huachuca in Arizona before shipping out to the Pacific Theater as part of the segregated 93rd Infantry Division. He became a military captain and earned a Bronze Star Medal, the Distinguished Service Medal, the Asiatic Pacific Service Metal, and the Combat Infantry Badge for his service. After the war ended in 1945, he returned to the Law School and earned his LL.B. degree the following year.

== Law career ==
He passed the Massachusetts Bar in 1946; then, impressed that Black congressman William Dawson had been elected to public office, moved to Chicago and passed the Illinois Bar in 1947. His early years as a lawyer were spent in private practice, including with Christopher C. Wimbish. From 1947 and 1952, he was the president of the Third Ward Regular Democratic Organization; he then was elected Assistant State Attorney General of Illinois in 1949. He served two terms and left in 1951 to co-found Moore, Ming, and Leighton (later McCoy, Ming, and Leighton), one of the largest Black law firms in the United States. Chicago was still deeply segregated at this time and he was unable to rent an office from a white landlord, so he moved to the South Side and worked near Comiskey Park. Many of his clients were too poor to afford his services, so he often worked for free, and when he was paid, it was usually between $50 and $100.

In 1964, Chicago Mayor Richard J. Daley asked Leighton to run for Circuit Court judge; he was elected in 1964 and won by a landslide despite being the only Black person on the 18-person Democratic ticket. He began teaching at the John Marshall Law School the following year; he was later involved in convincing the American Bar Association to continue accrediting evening law programs. In 1969, Walter V. Schaefer, Chief Justice of the Supreme Court of Illinois, asked Leighton to accept an assignment to the Illinois Court of Appeals in Illinois' First District. He accepted and served in that role for 11 years. He was the first Black man to be appointed to this position. In 1975, he was again contacted for a promotion. Charles H. Percy, a Republican Senator in Illinois, recommended Leighton to President Gerald Ford as a United States District Court judge. Leighton was sworn in in front of a Republican-controlled Senate and held the role until 1987, when his wife Virginia became ill and he stepped down from the bench. He had been made a senior judge the year before. He became counsel for Neal & Associates (now Neal & Leroy), a minority-owned firm, to earn enough money for Virginia's around-the-clock medical care and only left the practice in 2011 at age 99.

Leighton often traveled to the South to provide legal counsel, especially on civil rights issues. He brushed shoulders with many notable Black professionals; he mentored several Chicago lawyers including Barack Obama and at one point had Martin Luther King Jr. as a client.

== Notable cases ==
=== Schnell v. Davis (1949) ===
More generally known as the Boswell Amendment case, Schnell v. Davis was a lawsuit filed in response to the Boswell Amendment, which required voter registrants to pass a test before being allowed to vote. The test was to be able to explain a provision of the U.S. Constitution.

Leighton traveled from Chicago to Mobile, Alabama to serve as counsel alongside David R. Landau to 10 Black people who were told their answers were not satisfactory, while "white applicants with less qualifications were registered." The defense consisted of Governor Jim Folsom and the Mobile County Board of Registrars; their attorneys were Alabama Attorney General Albert A. Carmichael, Assistant Alabama Attorney General Si Garrett, Geneva County Representative (and writer of the Boswell Amendment) E.C. "Bud" Boswell, Klan leader Ira B. Thompson, Kenneth Griffith, and Carl Booth. Plaintiffs argued their qualifications satisfied all other requirements and requested that the judge declare the Boswell Amendment unconstitutional.

Eventually, a three-judge court declared it unconstitutional on the grounds of being used to discriminate "for the franchise of the basis of race and color." Judge Mullins agreed that the Amendment violated the Fifteenth Amendment.

=== Harrisburg desegregation case (1951) ===
In 1950, Harrisburg City schools in Harrisburg, Illinois blocked Black children from applying to schools other than the historically Black-only Lincoln School, alleging that the applications came in late and that "arrangements had already been made for enrollment at customary schools." Defendants in the case were Dale Wilson, county superintendent of schools; Russell Malan, superintendent of Harrisburg schools; and D.B. McGehee, president of the Board of Education for School District 43; they were represented by George B. Lee and L.M. Hancock. Leighton, representing 6 parents and their 14 children, filed a lawsuit for injunction that Harrisburg schools be ordered to desegregate. He also mentioned that Black-only schools had poorer facilities and resources than white-only schools, and that segregation violated the Fourteenth Amendment.

In March 1951, Harrisburg schools were ordered to desegregate schools by October 1. Judge Casper Platt told the school board they had a month to put their intent to desegregate into a legal document, including the date that schools must be desegregated by. The Board agreed to zone Black children to the schools nearest their home, and to close the Black-only school. In October 1951, inspectors visited the schools to ensure desegregation had adequately taken place.

Around the same time, Leighton and colleague William Robert Ming worked a similar case in Cairo, Illinois with counsel from Thurgood Marshall.

=== Cicero race riots (1951) ===
In 1951, WWII veteran Harvey Clark and his family attempted to rent an apartment owned by Camille DeRose in the all-white suburb of Cicero, Illinois and were quickly turned away by the sheriff. Leighton gave them legal permission to rent. When they returned to Cicero in July 1951, however, about 4,000 white residents rioted and the apartment building was set on fire. While 60 police officers were on site, they reportedly did not provide crowd control, though they did eventually request that the firemen turn their hose on the rioters; they were refused. County Sheriff John E. Babb contacted Governor Adlai Stevenson to request the Illinois National Guard be sent in. The mob caused more than $20,000 in damage and 119 rioters were arrested and charged with unlawful assembly.

Along with five others, Leighton was indicted for inciting the riot. Three months later, Assistant State Attorney James A. Brown requested the charges be dropped against Leighton. Leighton used the false indictment charges against him as a lesson in understanding "defendants [who] say to me, 'Judge, I ain't guilty,' I could see what he meant because I had gone through the same thing." All indictments were eventually dismissed, barring the one against Cicero Police Chief Erwin Konovsky, who was charged for "malfeasance in office in failing to prevent the mob from rioting." Fines dealt to three police officers, including Konovsky, were sentenced, but later repealed by the Illinois Court of Appeals.

In October 1951, a federal jury was formed to investigate the riot. The NAACP provided counsel for the Clark family in his $200,000 suit against Cicero. The case wrapped up in April 1957 when Cicero agreed to settle with Camille DeRose for $4,300 and with the Clarks for $2,400. The Clarks subsequently moved to Detroit.

After the riot, a Black family purchased the home from Camille DeRose and "rent[ed] to all comers, preferably negro and white war veterans."

=== Earl Howard Pugh (1955) ===
In 1936, Earl Howard Pugh and William Fowler were arrested of murdering railway worker William Hagg during a robbery. Pugh received life in prison and Fowler was given 199 years. In 1951, Leighton found that the arresting officers had intimidated a false confession out of the two men and concealed documents that would have shown they were not guilty. Fowler died in 1949 in prison and Pugh was released in 1955 and awarded $51,000 from the Illinois General Assembly in retribution. Pugh was 20 at the time he entered prison and 37 upon his release.

=== Martin Luther King Jr. (1960) ===
In 1960, Martin Luther King Jr. was arrested for a traffic violation in DeKalb County, Georgia near Atlanta. He and his wife had invited white writer Lillian Smith to dinner and he was driving her back to Emory University, where she was receiving cancer treatments, when he was pulled over and falsely charged for driving without a license. He was placed on a probation that would end in jail time if he broke any more laws; he was not informed of this and a few days later participated in a sit-in at Rich's Department Store. He was arrested and sentenced to four months in prison. Leighton and Thurgood Marshall represented him during his appeal. While in jail, King contacted presidential candidates Richard Nixon and John F. Kennedy. Nixon did not respond but Kennedy called Coretta; a few days later, Robert F. Kennedy contacted the sentencing judge and the decision was reversed.

=== Lloyd Eldon Miller Jr. v. Pate (1967) ===
Lloyd Miller was convicted on September 29, 1956, in Carthage, Illinois on charge of the November 1955 rape and murder of 8-year-old Janice May of Canton, Illinois. Less than a month later, he was sentenced to death by electric chair. Miller appealed a number of times, nearly once per year, but they were continuously dismissed.

Leighton joined the case pro bono in 1963 and alleged that the prosecution had buried evidence that would have immediately exonerated Miller. Judge Joseph Sam Perry contacted the Illinois Supreme Court, who had already rejected four of Miller's appeals, to request a deferral of Miller's execution so he might be retried. Not long after, a journalist who worked on the Miller case spoke to his children and learned that the girls, 7 and 8 at the time, had seen Miller at the supposed time of the murder but didn't realize this should have been reported. Miller was renting a room from their grandmother at the time and had requested someone wake him from his nap at 4:00pm; May's body was found at 4:30pm. One of Miller's ex-girlfriends, who testified he had told her he murdered May, came forward about lying on the stand and that she had done so at the request of the Fulton County Deputy Sheriff, who paid her off. In fact, what he told her was that he was going to be blamed for the death.

Miller claimed that after his initial arrest, he was held for 52 hours and was not allowed to contact his family or attorney. He was told he could do so if he signed some documentation about the case, which he did not realize was a confession. Following the new eye-witness report and Miller's ex-girlfriend admitting to perjury, Judge Joseph Sam Perry told Hancock County authorities that they had to retry Miller within three months. A year later, the United States Court of Appeals found that Miller had been tried fairly and evidence was not misrepresented. Despite this, he requested another hearing a month later. He was granted one in 1966 by the Illinois Supreme Court but the appeal was not successful in his favor.

At the beginning of 1967, Miller's legal team found that prosecutors had withheld vital information for over eight years, that being the strand of hair found on May's body did not belong to Miller. They knew this information before the first trial even occurred. The case was elevated to the United States Supreme Court, where the prosecutors were interrogated about the 1955 trial. Another article of evidence came forward: the stained shorts found near May's body were covered in paint, not blood as the defendants had led them to believe. The Supreme Court very quickly and unanimously withdrew the conviction because they refused to "tolerate a state criminal conviction obtained by the knowing use of false evidence."

Miller was released from prison in March 1967 after 11 years in prison.

== Membership and leadership ==
Leighton was part of a number of organizations and held numerous leadership positions:

- Political memberships:
  - Cook County Democratic Party: Central Committee Chairman
  - Democratic Party
  - Independent Voters of Illinois
- Law memberships:
  - American Bar Association: Rights and Responsibilities Committee member; Judicial Administration Committee member; Legal Education Committee member; Council of the Section of Legal Education and Admissions member, vice chairman, Chairman-elect, chairman, Immediate Past Chairman (1970—1978)
  - First Appellate District of Illinois: Chairman of the Character and Fitness Committee (1961—1963)
  - Chicago Bar Association: Board of Managers member; Grievance Committee member; Librarian
  - Circuit Court of Cook County, Illinois: Master in Chancery (1960—1964)
  - Cook County Bar Association
  - Cosmopolitan Chamber of Commerce: Chairman of the Legislative Committee
  - Illinois State Bar Association: Chairman of the Bill of Rights Committee (1963)
  - Illinois Supreme Court: Commissioner
  - Inter-American Bar Association
  - National Association of Defense Lawyers in Criminal Cases
  - National Bar Association
  - Massachusetts Bar Association
- Civil rights memberships:
  - American Civil Liberties Union, Illinois Division: Member of the Advisory Committee
  - Citizens' Committee for the Adoption of the Fair Employment Practice Act: Member of drafting sub-committee
  - Committee for the Adoption of an Open Occupancy Statue: Member
  - NAACP Chicago chapter: Chairman of the Legal Redress Committee (1949—1952) Chicago chapter president (1952—1953); Chairman of the Political Action Committee and Legal Redress Committee (1962—1964); life member (1964—)
  - US Commission on Civil Rights: Chairman of the Illinois Advisory Committee
- University memberships:
  - American College of Trial Lawyers: Fellow
  - Harvard College: Overseer (1983—1989)
  - Harvard Law School Association: International member
  - Howard University: Chicago chapter president of alumni association (1947—1948)
  - University of Notre Dame: Trustee (1979—1983), Trustee Emeritus (1983)
- Honorary memberships:
  - Loyola University Chicago: Honorary Doctor of Laws degree (1989)
  - Phi Alpha Delta: Honorary member of the Chicago alumni chapter (2009)
- Other memberships
  - Chicago Committee on Urban Opportunity: Member
  - Chicago Tuberculosis Institute: Board of Directors member
  - Mayor's Citizens Committee on City Revenue and Expenditures: Member
  - Grant Hospital: Board of Directors member
  - Rand Corporation: Overseer (1987)
  - United Auto Workers: Public Review Board member (1961—1970)
  - United Church of Christ (Chicago): Board of Directors member

== Personal life and death ==
He met his wife Virginia Berry Quivers while at Howard University. They married in Washington, DC and had two daughters: Virginia Anne and Barbara Elaine. Virginia suffered several strokes in the late 1980s and Leighton insisted she receive around-the-clock care. He retired from the bench to earn more money in private practice. She died in 1992.

Leighton turned 100 in October 2012. He spent his final years at the Brockton VA in Massachusetts. He died of pneumonia on June 6, 2018. He was survived by two daughters, five grandchildren, and eight great-grandchildren. He had always wanted to be buried at Arlington National Cemetery; his daughter Barbara and her husband Robert made sure he was.

Leighton was an avid chess player and traveled regularly for major chess tournaments across the country, including the Eastern Open (DC), New York Open (NY), World Open (PA), National Open (NV), New England Open (MA), Michigan Open (MI), American Open (CA), Chicago Open (IL), and Bermuda International Open (1993 and 1995). He stopped traveling in 1997 and played his last tournament in the 2002 US Masters. In March 1982, he beat Senior Master Leonid Kaushansky, his proudest chess moment.

== Legacy and honors ==
In 2019, he was awarded the Medal of Merit First Class from the Republic of Cape Verde. He also received the Illinois State Bar Association's first Diversity Leadership Award.

- In 2005, a USPS building in his hometown of New Bedford, Massachusetts was renamed the "Honorable Judge George N. Leighton Post Office Building" in his honor.
- In 2008, Harvard Law School established the Honorable George N. Leighton Endowed Fund "to honor the judge's accomplishments and in hopes of providing a boost to other promising students"
- In 2009, the Illinois Supreme Court established the "Honorable George N. Leighton Justice Award," which recognizes one who has given exceptional service to the legal community and exhibits the qualities that personified Judge Leighton's character, service and legal career. He was the first recipient.
- In 2010, the Illinois Supreme Court Historic Preservation Commission established the "Honorable George Leighton Justice Award," which recognizes "a career full of significant achievements."
- In 2012, the Cook County Criminal Courthouse in Chicago was renamed the "Hon. George N. Leighton Criminal Court Building."
- In 2018, shortly after his death, a tree was planted on the Alfred J. Gomes Elementary School campus in New Bedford in his honor.

== See also ==
- List of African-American federal judges
- List of African-American jurists

Legal offices
Preceded by Abraham Lincoln Marovitz	Judge of the United States District Court for the Northern District of Illinois; 1976–1986	Succeeded by James Alesia
