= Pakkiri Rajagopal =

American politician

Pakkiri Rajagopal is an Indian-born American politician and law enforcement official from Hamilton County, Ohio. A member of the Republican Party, he was a presidential elector in 2000.

== Early life and education ==
Rajagopal was born in Pollal, Tamil Nadu, India, located near Chennai. He graduated from Madras University, and after immigrating to the United States received his master's degree in criminal justice from the University of Cincinnati.

== Career ==
In 1980, Rajagopal became a deputy sheriff in Hamilton County. He later became involved with the Probation Department, and in 2004 was serving as director of the department.

=== Political involvement ===
Rajagopal served as president of the Hamilton County Republican Party. He was a presidential elector in 2000. In 2004, he was an alternate delegate to the Republican Convention. In 2017, he was elected as a trustee in Colerain, Ohio. During the campaign for trustee, he was the subject of a complaint after sending out a mailer that included a false claim regarding who paid for the mailer.

== Sources ==
- News India Times article on Rajagopal
