= Virginia Hartigan Cain =

American political activist

- Born: May 1, 1922; Brooklyn, New York, U.S.
- Died: September 19, 2017 (aged 95); Los Angeles, California, U.S.
- Political party: Democratic

Virginia Hartigan Cain (May 1, 1922 – September 19, 2017) was an American politician activist in the state of Nevada for the Democratic Party. She was a teacher at Reno High School and a project coordinator with the National Council of Juvenile and Family Court Judges, where she helped to pass the Indian Child Welfare Act of 1978. She was a member of the Nevada State Democrat Central Committee and chair of the Nevada Democratic Party.

== Early life ==
Cain was born on May 1, 1922, in Brooklyn, New York. Her parents were James Gerard Hartigan and Virginia Hainza Hartigan (née Williams). The family moved to Asbury Park, New Jersey, and Cain returned to New York when she was sixteen to study at New York University, where she received her bachelor's of arts degree in 1943. She worked for the United States Army as a civilian personnel counselor during World War II, stationed at Fort Monmouth in New Jersey. She met Edmund Joseph Cain, a lieutenant in the Army Signal Corps, and the couple got married in 1944. The couple had three children: Edmund J. III, Mary Ellen and James Michael. They moved to New York, Connecticut, Delaware, overseas to Santiago, Chile, before settling in Reno, Nevada.

== Career ==
Her husband worked as the dean of education at the University of Nevada, Reno, while Cain worked first at Our Lady of the Snows Parochial School and later taught English and American government at Reno High School. She ran for a seat on the Washoe County School Board in 1968, campaigning on the issues of teaching about race, increased technical and vocational training and hiring social workers in schools. In 1978, United States Court of Appeals for the Ninth District found in favor of her case against members of the Washoe County School Board in the case of Cain v. McQueen 580 F.2d 1001 (9th Cir. 1978), in a decision affirming that her right of due process was breached by the school board's hiring decisions. She worked as a project coordinator with the National Council of Juvenile and Family Court Judges, where she helped to pass the Indian Child Welfare Act of 1978 which created exclusive tribal jurisdiction where custody proceedings involved Native American children. She was involved with the American Association of University Women, the Business and Professional Women's Association and the National Education Association.

Cain first became involved in Democratic politics in 1944 when she voted for Franklin Delano Roosevelt. She was vice chair of the Association of State Democratic Chairs and a member of the Democratic National Committee. She attended four Democratic National Conventions as a delegate and was Nevada chair or co-chair of the presidential campaigns of George McGovern, Jimmy Carter, Ted Kennedy and Bill Clinton. She was an elector in the electoral college for Clinton and during the 1976 presidential campaign, Carter's son stayed at her house. In 1980, she was appointed an at-large delegate for the White House Conference on Families. She was a member of the Nevada Governor's Advisory Commission on Youth, the Commission on the Status of Women and the Commission on Aging. She was elected as the chair of the Nevada Democratic Party in 1994, taking over from Tick Segerblom after the other candidates dropped out of the race. She had previously served as the first vice chair of the state party.

== Later life ==
Cain was president of the Nevada Silver-Haired Legislative Forum and a member of the Sanford Center on Aging at the University of Nevada. Her husband died on January 17, 2003. Cain died on September 19, 2017, in Los Angeles, California. A collection of her and her husband's papers are stored at the University of Nevada, Reno. An award named in her honor, the Virginia Cain Leadership Award, is given annually by the Nevada State Democratic Central Committee.
