= William J. Hibbler =

American judge

Judge of the United States District Court for the Northern District of Illinois
- In office April 22, 1999 – March 19, 2012
- Appointed by: Bill Clinton
- Preceded by: James Alesia
- Succeeded by: Andrea Wood

Personal details
- Born: August 7, 1946 Kennedy, Alabama, U.S.
- Died: March 19, 2012 (aged 65) Richton Park, Illinois, U.S.
- Education: University of Illinois at Chicago (BS); DePaul University College of Law (JD)

William James Hibbler (August 7, 1946 – March 19, 2012) was a United States district judge of the United States District Court for the Northern District of Illinois.

== Education and career ==
Born in Kennedy, Alabama, Hibbler received a Bachelor of Science degree from the University of Illinois at Chicago in 1969 and a Juris Doctor from DePaul University College of Law in 1973. He was an assistant state's attorney of the Cook County State's Attorney Office from 1973 to 1977. He was in private practice in Chicago, Illinois from 1977 to 1981, returning to the Cook County State's Attorney Office from 1981 to 1986. He was an associate judge, Cook County Circuit Court from 1986 to 1999, while also teaching as an adjunct professor in the Chicago–Kent College of Law from 1989 to 1999.

== Federal judicial service ==
On January 26, 1999, Hibbler was nominated by President Bill Clinton to a seat on the United States District Court for the Northern District of Illinois vacated by Judge James Alesia. Hibbler was confirmed by the United States Senate on April 15, 1999, and received his commission on April 22, 1999. Hibbler died Monday March 19, 2012 at age 65 after an unspecified illness.

== See also ==
- List of African-American federal judges
- List of African-American jurists

== Sources ==
Legal offices
Preceded by James Alesia	Judge of the United States District Court for the Northern District of Illinois; 1999–2012	Succeeded by Andrea Wood
