= Christie Hefner =

American businesswoman (born 1952)

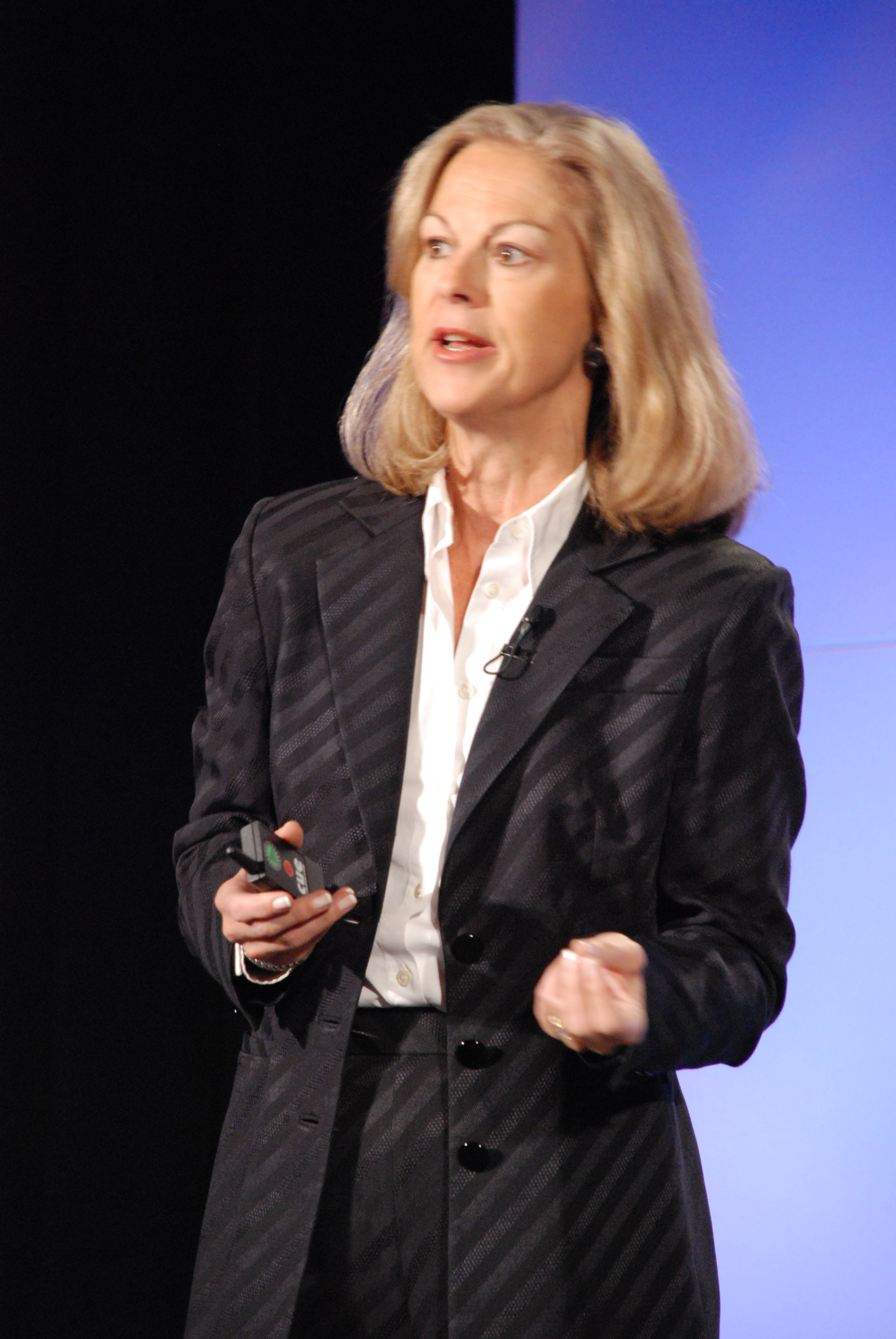
- Hefner at the Hilton Chicago in 2007
- Born: November 8, 1952 (age 74); Chicago, Illinois, U.S.
- Education: Brandeis University
- Occupation: Publisher
- Known for: Playboy Enterprises
- Spouse: William A. Marovitz (m. 1995; div. 2013)
- Parent(s): Hugh Hefner; Mildred Williams
- Relatives: Cooper Hefner (half-brother)

Christie Ann Hefner (born November 8, 1952) is an American businesswoman. She was chairman and CEO of Playboy Enterprises from 1988 to 2009, and is the daughter of Playboy magazine founder Hugh Hefner.

== Early life ==
Hefner was born in Chicago, Illinois. She is the daughter of Mildred Williams and Hugh Hefner. Her parents had separated by the time she was five. When her mother remarried, she moved to Wilmette, Illinois. There she graduated from New Trier High School. She attended the National Music Camp at Interlochen, Michigan, during the summers from 1964 to 1969.

She graduated summa cum laude from Brandeis University with a bachelor's degree in English and American literature in 1974. She was elected to Phi Beta Kappa in her junior year.

== Career ==
After college, Hefner freelanced for the Boston Phoenix for a year, writing movie reviews. Thereafter, she moved back to Chicago and started working at Playboy.

In 1982, she became president of Playboy Enterprises, and was made chairman of the board and CEO in 1988. She was the longest-serving female CEO of a publicly traded company. She extended its magazine franchise overseas, to 25 localized foreign editions and also developed the company's profitable pay television business — the first time a magazine successfully leveraged its brand into a television network. The company also acquired adult-oriented businesses such as Spice Network and ClubJenna.

Continuing the company's electronic expansion, in 1994, Hefner led the company onto the Internet with the launch of Playboy.com, the first national magazine to launch a website, and built an international, profitable, multi-revenue stream business, including premium content, e-commerce, advertising and gaming, both online and mobile. She also built a highly profitable direct marketing, catalog and e-commerce business in film and music through both acquisition and organic growth. Hefner greatly expanded the leveraging of the Playboy brand via licensing. In her last year as CEO, Playboy generated close to $1 billion in global retail sales, 80% of the sales to women. When she left, over 40% of her executives were women. For three years, she was named to Fortune's list of "Most Powerful Women".

In 2008, she released a memo to employees about her efforts to streamline the company's operations, including eliminating its DVD division and laying off staff.

On December 8, 2008, she announced her plans to step down as CEO of Playboy. Hefner said that the election of Barack Obama as U.S. president had inspired her to give more time to charitable work, and that the decision to step down was her own. "Just as this country is embracing change in the form of new leadership, I have decided that now is the time to make changes in my own life as well", she said. She stepped down from as Playboy CEO on January 30, 2009.

In May 2011, Hefner was named executive chairman of Canyon Ranch Enterprises, a resort company that operates six premier spa destinations and an online website providing health and wellness advice.

As of 2015, Hefner was chairman of the board of Hatchbeauty Brands. Hefner also serves on the advisory boards of the R.D. Offutt company and Edge Beauty.

== Philanthropy ==
Hefner created the Hugh M. Hefner First Amendment Award in honor of her father, and has helped to raise $30 million to build the CORE Center in Chicago, the first outpatient facility in the Midwest for people with AIDS.

Her non-profit work includes Rush University Center (Trustee/Member), Springboard Enterprises (Advisory Board Member), Center for American Progress Action (Director/Member Audit Committee), Better Government Association (Civic Advisory Committee), and Press Forward (Steering Committee).

== Personal life ==
Hefner married former Illinois state senator William A. Marovitz, a real estate developer and attorney, in 1995. They divorced in 2013 and had no children. Marovitz was sued by the U.S. Securities and Exchange Commission for allegedly using inside information to trade illegally in shares of Playboy. In 2011, he settled out of court for $168,352.

== Bibliography ==
- Reed, Cheryl, L. (2004). "Career built on guts, family ties -- and skin". Chicago Sun-Times. Archived from the original on May 11, 2004.
- Watts, Steven (2008). Mr. Playboy: Hugh Hefner and the American Dream. Hoboken: John Wiley & Sons. ISBN 0-471-69059-7
