= Elizabeth Dennigan =

American politician

Member of the Rhode Island House of Representatives from the 62nd district
- In office January 7, 1997 – October 1, 2009
- Succeeded by: Mary Messier

Personal details
- Born: October 27, 1954 (age 71) Hinesville, Georgia
- Party: Democratic

Elizabeth Dennigan (born October 27, 1954) is an American politician who served in the Rhode Island House of Representatives from the 62nd district from 1997 to 2009.
