= Julius Howard Miner =

American judge from Illinois (1896–1963)

Judge of the United States District Court for the Northern District of Illinois
- In office February 27, 1958 – March 13, 1963
- Appointed by: Dwight D. Eisenhower
- Preceded by: John P. Barnes
- Succeeded by: Abraham Lincoln Marovitz

Judge of the Circuit Court of Cook County
- In office 1940–1958

Personal details
- Born: Julius Howard Miner; May 25, 1896 Luboń, Russian Empire
- Died: March 13, 1963 (aged 66)
- Education: Chicago-Kent College of Law (LL.B.); Northwestern University Pritzker School of Law (LL.M.)

Julius Howard Miner (May 25, 1896 – March 13, 1963) was a United States district judge of the United States District Court for the Northern District of Illinois.

== Education and career ==
Miner was born on May 25, 1896, in Lubon, which was then a part of the Russian Empire. In the United States, he received a Bachelor of Laws from Chicago-Kent College of Law in 1917, and a Master of Laws from Northwestern University Pritzker School of Law in 1945. He was in private practice in Chicago, Illinois, from 1917 to 1924, when he was appointed a Master in Chancery for the Circuit Court of Cook County. He served in that role until he became a judge of that court in 1940; he served until his appointment to the federal bench. He was a lecturer at the John Marshall Law School from 1938 to 1949, and began lecturing at the Northwestern University Pritzker School of Law in 1945.

In 1946, Miner wrote a paper criticizing trial by jury in the United States.

=== Divorce cases and Strack family photo ===
Illinois judges could not allow for a no-fault divorce until 2016, so someone divorcing their spouse had to prove in court that their spouse's behavior was serious and irreparably ruined the marriage. Miner was concerned about the effect of divorce on the children of affected couples. He believed that most failed marriages are reconcilable—and that women's greater role in American society during World War II undermined, Business Insider writes, women's "responsibilities as wives and mothers", thus leading to divorces. By the late 1940s, Miner essentially acted as a marriage therapist in every divorce case he preceded, trying to get couples to reconcile, and only allowed a divorce under extreme circumstances.

Miner preceded over a 1948 case in which Chicago resident Anna Strack wanted to divorce her husband, Steve Strack, over his habitual alcoholism. This led to a famous photo taken right before Anna presented her case for divorce to Miner, which shows Steve kneeling before her and holding her hands, begging her not to divorce him, while she looks disinterested. The protest ultimately did not convince her to stay with him. After the photo appeared in the Chicago Tribune that year, the newspaper interviewed Miner over his thoughts on this and other divorce cases; Miner said he tried, but ultimately could not get, the Stracks to stay together. Anna successfully divorced Steve; he later remarried, while she did not. The photo, described by Business Insider as "evocative", went viral on social media platforms such as Reddit in the 2020s.

== Federal judicial service ==
Miner was nominated by President Dwight D. Eisenhower on January 23, 1958, to a seat on the United States District Court for the Northern District of Illinois vacated by Judge John P. Barnes. He was confirmed by the United States Senate on February 25, 1958, and received his commission on February 27, 1958. Miner served in that capacity until his death on March 13, 1963.

== Sources ==
Legal offices
Preceded by John P. Barnes	Judge of the United States District Court for the Northern District of Illinois; 1958–1963	Succeeded by Abraham Lincoln Marovitz
