= Alec Poitevint =

American businessman

- Born: 1947 (age 78–79); Bainbridge, Georgia, U.S.
- Education: University of Georgia
- Political party: Republican

Alec L. Poitevint II (born 1947) is a Georgia businessman and longtime official of the U.S. Republican Party (GOP). In February 2011, he was named by GOP Chairman Reince Priebus to manage the 2012 Republican National Convention, to be held in Tampa beginning on August 27, 2012. Poitevint replaces the team appointed by former RNC Chair Michael Steele, who Priebus fired immediately after his election as chairman in January 2011. Poitevint's official title of chairman of the Committee on Arrangements.

Poitevint served as chairman of the Georgia Republican Party in the 2000s, overseeing capture of the governorship by his party for the first time in 134 years, as well as achieving control of the state senate and house of representatives. He currently serves as Republican National Committeeman from Georgia.

From 1997 to 2001, Poitevint served as treasurer of the Republican National Committee under then-Chair Jim Nicholson. He has been a member of the National Committee since 1989.

== Business and public career ==
Poitevint is chairman and president of Southeastern Minerals, Inc. and its affiliated companies, headquartered in Bainbridge, Georgia.

He also served as director of United Insurance Holding Corp. of St. Petersburg, Florida, an insurance holding company that writes and services property and casualty policies, from 2001 through 2009.

He has served on several corporate boards, including Forbes, to which he was named in October 2008. Others include the First Port City Bank of Bainbridge (since 1989), and the Virbac Corp. (NASDAQ) of Fort Worth, Texas. He is also the past chairman of the American Feed Industry Association and the National Feed Ingredients Association.

In June 2010, he was named chairman of the board of the Georgia Ports Authority. He had first been appointed to the board in July 2007 by Governor Sonny Perdue.

He serves as a director of the Georgia Agribusiness Council and was Federal Commissioner of the Apalachicola-Chattahoochee-Flint (ACF) Water Compact. He was a former mission member of the U.S. Agricultural Trade and Development Mission to Europe in 1990 and U.S. Delegate to the World Food Summit in 2002.

He received his undergraduate degree from the University of Georgia, majoring in economics.
