= William A. Marovitz =

American lawyer and politician (born 1944)

Member of the Illinois Senate from the 3rd district
- In office 1981 – 1993

Member of the Illinois House of Representatives from the 12th district
- In office 1977 – 1980

Personal details
- Born: September 29, 1944 (age 82)
- Party: Democratic
- Spouse: Christie Hefner (m. 1995; div. 2013)
- Relations: Abraham Lincoln Marovitz (paternal uncle)

William A. Marovitz (born September 29, 1944) is an American lawyer and politician who was involved in real estate in Chicago and was married to Christie Hefner from 1995 to 2013.

== Career ==
Marovitz is the son of Sydney Marovitz, the former longtime member of the Chicago Park District Board, and the nephew of the late federal judge Abraham Lincoln Marovitz, an attorney who served in the Illinois General Assembly for 19 years and started work as a real estate developer.

=== Business, political and civic career ===
Marovitz is a member of the Anti-Defamation League, the Weizmann Institute of Science, the Chicago Convention and Tourism Bureau, DePaul University, the Gene Siskel Film Center, and the Illinois Council Against Handgun Violence. He was president of the Marovitz Group. Marovitz was a Democratic state representative and state senator in Illinois and is a committeeman in the state Democratic Party's Central Committee. Marovitz served as a member of the Illinois Pollution Control Board from July 1, 2002, to November 30, 2003.

Marovitz was sued by the Securities Exchange Commission for allegedly using inside information to trade illegally in shares of Playboy. In 2011, he settled out of court for $168,352.

In 2000, 2008, and 2016, Marovitz was a presidential elector from Illinois.

=== Election results ===
Marovitz won nine elections and was a member of the Illinois State Senate and the Illinois House of Representatives

02/02/2010	IL Central Committeeman Dist. 9	Won 100.00% (+100.00%)
03/21/2006	IL Central Committeeman Dist. 9	Won 59.79% (+19.59%)
03/19/2002	Central Committeeman	Won 100.00% (+100.00%)
11/08/1988	IL State Senate 3	Won 70.74% (+41.47%)
11/04/1986	IL State Senate 3	Won 71.75% (+43.50%)
11/02/1982	IL State Senate 3	Won 100.00% (+100.00%)
11/04/1980	IL State Senate 12	Won 73.01% (+46.02%)
11/07/1978	IL State House 12	Won 36.99% (+0.00%)
11/02/1976	IL State House 12	Won 36.55% (+0.00%)

== Personal life ==
In 1995, Marovitz married Christie Hefner, who was CEO of Playboy Enterprises until January 2009. They had no children and divorced in 2013.
