= 2017 United States Electoral College vote count =

Last step of 2016 presidential election

- January 6, 2017

538 members of the Electoral College 270 electoral votes needed to win

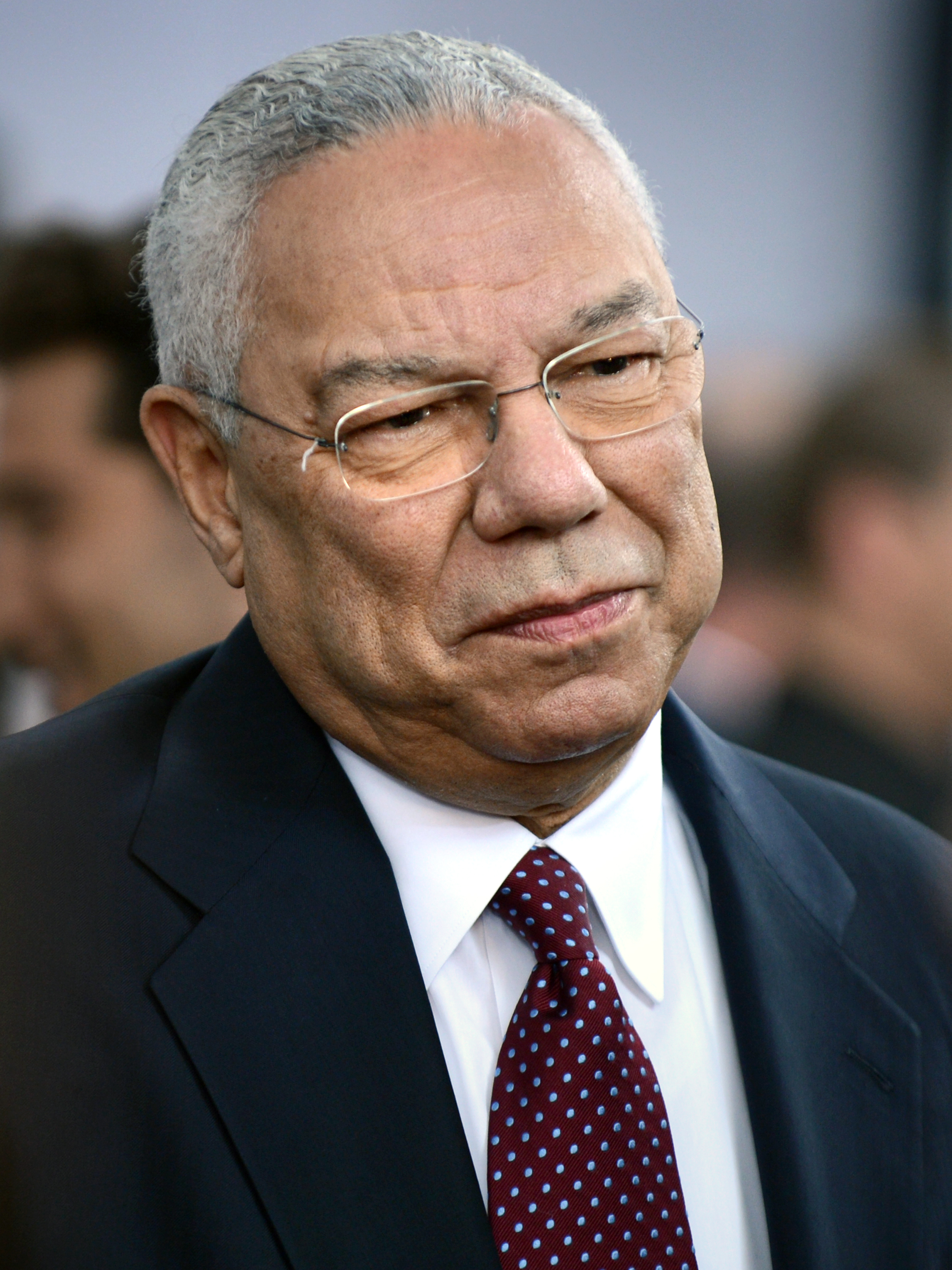

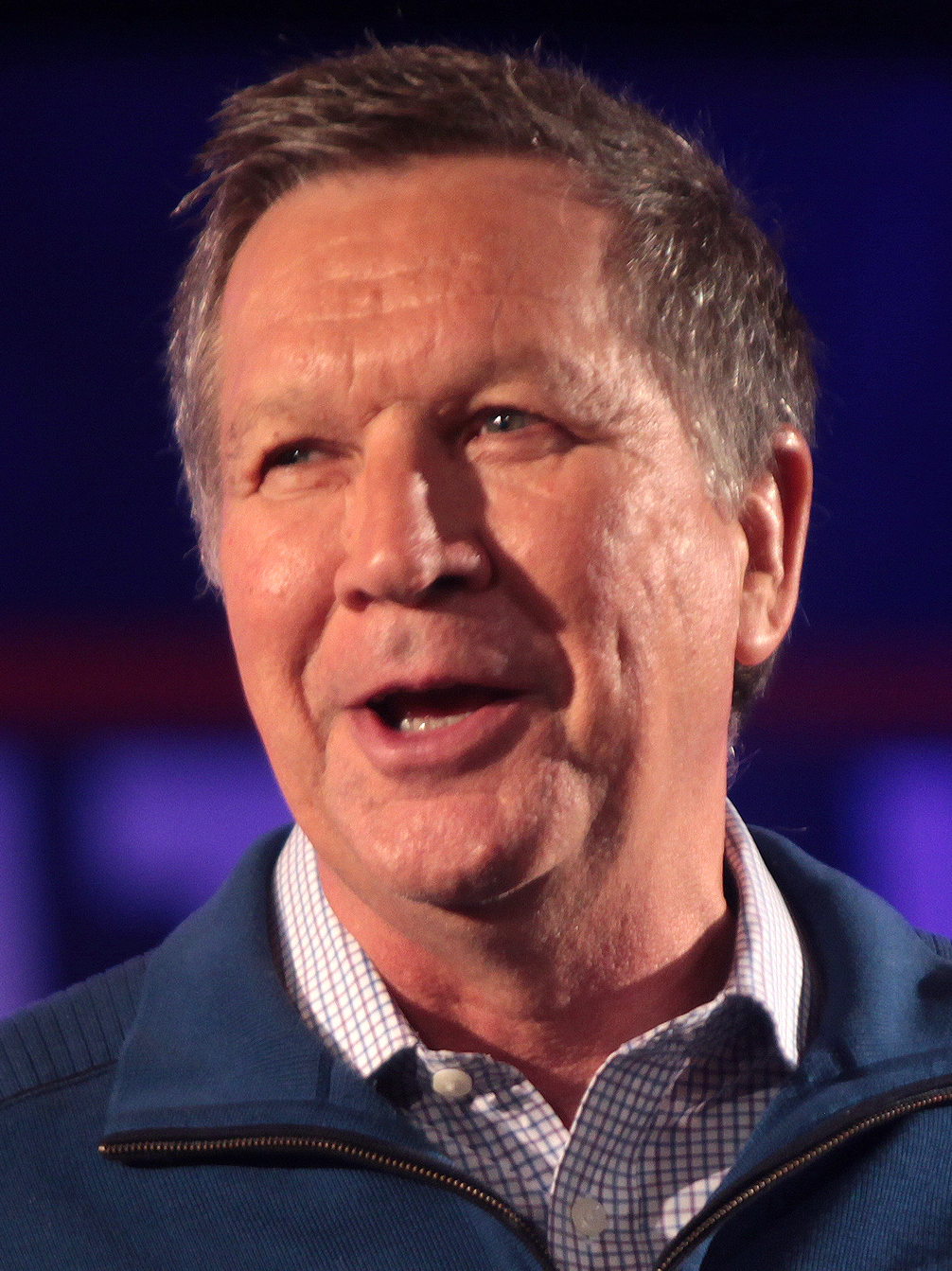

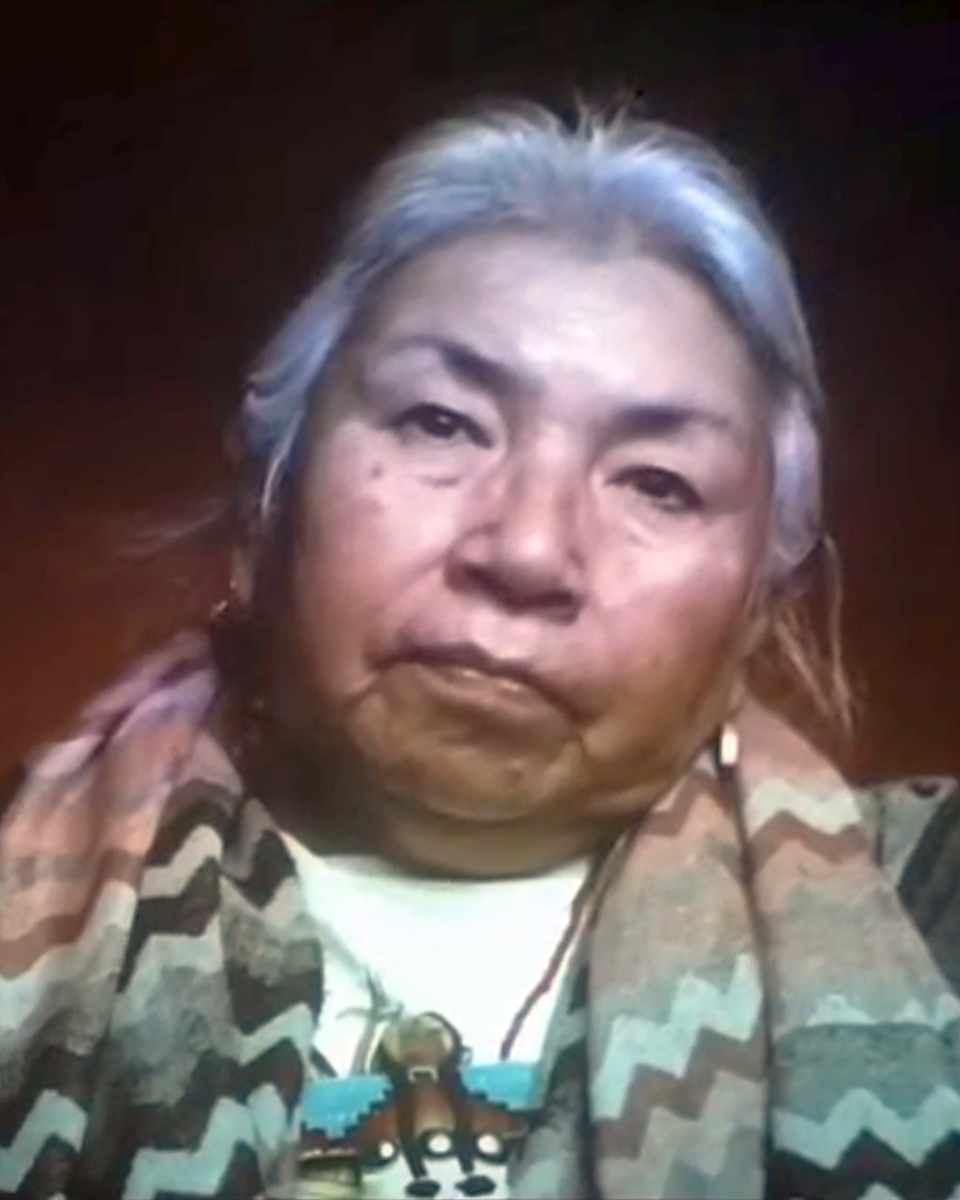
Candidate	Donald Trump	Hillary Clinton	Colin Powell
Party	Republican	Democratic	Republican
Home state	New York	New York	Virginia
Running mate	Mike Pence	Tim Kaine	Multiple (Note: Powell's electors cast their vice presidential vote for three different individuals: Maria Cantwell, Susan Collins, and Elizabeth Warren.)
Electoral vote	304 (Note: In state-by-state tallies, Trump earned 306 pledged electors, Clinton 232. They lost respectively two and five votes to faithless electors. Vice presidential candidates Pence and Kaine lost one and five votes, respectively. Three other votes by electors were invalidated and recast.)	227	3
States carried	30 + ME-02	20 + DC	0
Candidate	Bernie Sanders	John Kasich	Ron Paul
Party	Independent	Republican	Libertarian
Home state	Vermont	Ohio	Texas
Running mate	Elizabeth Warren	Carly Fiorina	Mike Pence
Electoral vote	1	1	1
States carried	0	0	0
Candidate	Faith Spotted Eagle
Party	Democratic
Home state	South Dakota
Running mate	Winona LaDuke
Electoral vote	1
States carried	0
- Objections made to the electoral college votes of the 2016 U.S. presidential election. No objections Objection(s) attempted (Note: Pursuant to the Electoral Count Act of 1887, an objection requires the assent of a Representative and a Senator in order to be sustained before Congress. In all these cases, the attempted objections failed to receive assent from a Senator.)
President before election
Barack Obama
Democratic
Elected President
Donald Trump
Republican

The count of the Electoral College ballots during a joint session of the 115th United States Congress, pursuant to the Electoral Count Act, on January 6, 2017, was held as the final step to confirm President-elect Donald Trump's victory in the 2016 presidential election over former Secretary of State Hillary Clinton.

This event was notable due to the many faithless electors in the electoral college votes, and the many unsuccessful objections raised by Democratic members of the United States House of Representatives.

== Background ==
The United States Electoral College is the group of presidential electors required by the Constitution to form every four years for the sole purpose of electing the president and vice president. Each state appoints electors according to its legislature, equal in number to its congressional delegation (senators and representatives). Federal office holders cannot be electors. Of the current 538 electors, an absolute majority of 270 or more electoral votes is required to elect the president and vice president. If no candidate achieves an absolute majority there, a contingent election is held by the United States House of Representatives to elect the president, and by the United States Senate to elect the vice president.

Each state and the District of Columbia produces two documents to be forwarded to Congress, a certificate of ascertainment and a certificate of vote. A certificate of ascertainment is an official document that identifies the state's appointed College electors and the tally of the final popular vote count for each candidate in that state in a presidential election; the certificate of ascertainment is submitted after an election by the governor of each state to the archivist of the United States and others, in accordance with 3 U.S.C. §§ 6–14 and the Electoral Count Act. Within the United States' electoral system, the certificates "[represent] a crucial link between the popular vote and votes cast by electors". The certificates must bear the state seal and the governor's signature. Staff from the Office of the Federal Register ensure that each certificate contains all legally required information. When each state's appointed electors meet to vote (on the first Monday after the second Wednesday of December), they sign and record their vote on a certificate of vote, which are then paired with the certificate of ascertainment, which together are sent to be opened and counted by congress.

The 12th Amendment mandates Congress assemble in joint session to count the electoral votes and declare the winners of the election. The Electoral Count Act, a federal law passed in 1887, further established specific procedures for the counting of the electoral votes by the joint Congress. The session is ordinarily required to take place on January 6 in the calendar year immediately following the meetings of the presidential electors. Since the 20th Amendment, the newly elected joint Congress declares the winner of the election; all elections before 1936 were determined by the outgoing Congress.

A state's certificate of vote can be rejected only if both Houses of Congress, debating separately, vote to accept an objection by a majority in each House. If the objection is approved by both Houses, the state's votes are not included in the count. Individual votes can also be objected to, and are also not counted. If there are no objections or all objections are overruled, the presiding officer simply includes a state's votes, as declared in the certificate of vote, in the official tally. After the certificates from all states are read and the respective votes are counted, the presiding officer simply announces the final state of the vote. This announcement concludes the joint session and formalizes the recognition of the president-elect and of the vice president-elect. The senators then depart from the House chamber. The final tally is printed in the Senate and House journals.

=== Faithless electors ===
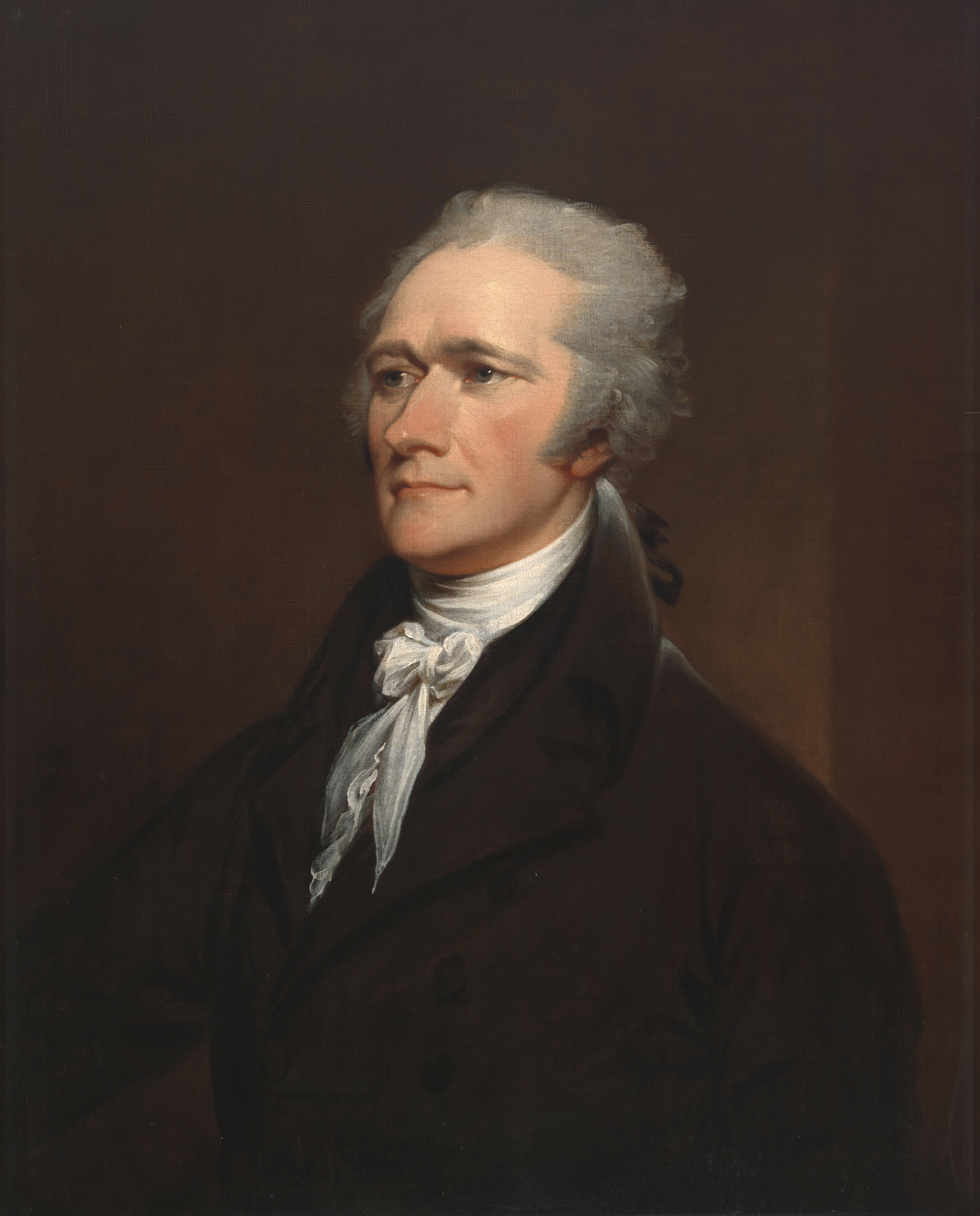
The namesake of the Hamilton Electors, Alexander Hamilton

In the 2016 United States presidential election, ten members of the Electoral College voted or attempted to vote for a candidate different from the ones to whom they were pledged. Three of these votes were invalidated under the faithless elector laws of their respective states, and the elector either subsequently voted for the pledged candidate or was replaced by someone who did. Although there had been a combined total of 155 instances of individual electors voting faithlessly prior to 2016 in over two centuries of previous US presidential elections, 2016 was the first election in over a hundred years in which multiple electors worked to alter the result of the election.

As a result of the seven successfully cast faithless votes, the Democratic Party nominee, Hillary Clinton, lost five of her pledged electors while the Republican Party nominee and then president-elect, Donald Trump, lost two. Three of the faithless electors voted for Colin Powell while John Kasich, Ron Paul, Bernie Sanders, and Faith Spotted Eagle each received one vote. The defections fell well short of the number needed to change the result of the election; only two of the seven defected from the winner, whereas 37 were needed to defect in order to force a contingent election in Congress (a tally of less than 270).

The faithless electors who opposed Donald Trump were part of a movement dubbed the "Hamilton Electors" co-founded by Micheal Baca of Colorado and Bret Chiafalo of Washington. The movement attempted to find 37 Republican electors willing to vote for a different Republican in an effort to deny Donald Trump a majority in the Electoral College and force a contingent election in the House of Representatives. The electors advocated for voting their conscience to prevent the election of someone they viewed as unfit for the presidency as prescribed by Alexander Hamilton in No. 68 of The Federalist Papers. Despite their stated intentions to defeat Donald Trump, these electors cast their votes for persons other than the candidate to whom they were pledged, Trump's opponent Hillary Clinton. By the time they switched their votes away from Trump's opponent, it was numerically impossible to achieve their stated goal as all but 30 of the Trump-pledged electoral votes had already been cast (in different states in the same or later time zones), with 37 votes needed to switch to deny Trump an outright victory in the Electoral College. Electors were subjected to public pressure, including threats of death. The Washington elector who voted for Spotted Eagle did so in protest of Clinton's support for the Dakota Access Pipeline; the vote made Spotted Eagle the first Native American to ever receive an Electoral College vote for president, as well as one of the first two women, along with Clinton, to receive one.

The seven validated faithless votes for president were the most to defect from presidential candidates who were still alive in electoral college history, surpassing the six electors who defected from James Madison in the 1808 election. This number of defections has been exceeded only once: in 1872, a record 63 of 66 electors who were originally pledged to losing candidate Horace Greeley cast their votes for someone else (Greeley had died between election day and the meeting of the Electoral College). The six faithless vice-presidential votes in 2016 are short of the record for that office, without considering whether the vice-presidential candidates were still living, as multiple previous elections have had more than six faithless vice-presidential votes; in 1836, faithless electors moved the vice-presidential decision to the US Senate, though this did not affect the outcome. (Full article...)

== Joint Session of Congress ==
A joint session of Congress convened at 1:00 PM EST on January 6, 2017, presided over by Vice President Biden, where the votes of the state electors were formally certified in the House chamber. The certification witnessed a total of 10 state certificates were objected to by Democratic members of Congress, all of which were to states won by Donald Trump. Objections to the votes needed to be in writing and signed by both a member of the House and a member of the Senate. Every House member who rose to object did so without a senator's signature. Many of the objections were raised due to disputed claims of voter suppression and foreign interference. Then-Vice President Joe Biden presided over the count. Senators Amy Klobuchar and Roy Blunt were the tellers from the Senate, and Representatives Gregg Harper and Bob Brady were the tellers from the House.

At 1:09 PM, Representative Jim McGovern raised the first objection, objecting the certification of Alabama's electors. Biden dismissed the objection because it lacked the signature of a senator. Shortly after, members Jamie Raskin and Pramila Jayapal objected to electors from Florida and Georgia, respectively. After Barbara Lee objected to Michigan's electors, her microphone was turned off. Lee later objected to West Virginia's electors. Representative Sheila Jackson Lee made a total of four objections, objecting the certification of Mississippi's, North Carolina's (in which Raul Grijalva also objected), South Carolina's, and Wisconsin's electors. Each time an objection was raised, Biden noted that the objections could not be entertained due to the lack of a signature from a senator. During Wyoming's certification, which was the final state to be certified, Maxine Waters pleaded to the chamber, asking for a senator to sign her objection. No senator came forward, and the procedure finished at 1:41 PM, with a total of 304 certified electoral college votes for Donald Trump and 227 certified electoral college votes for Hillary Clinton.

State	EV	EV winners	Faithless electors	Objection raised by
Alabama	9	Trump/Pence	None	Jim McGovern (D-MA-2)
Alaska	3	Trump/Pence	None	No Objections
Arizona	11	Trump/Pence	None	No Objections
Arkansas	6	Trump/Pence	None	No Objections
California	55	Clinton/Kaine	None	No Objections
Colorado	9	Clinton/Kaine	None	No Objections
Connecticut	7	Clinton/Kaine	None	No Objections
Delaware	3	Clinton/Kaine	None	No Objections
District of Columbia	3	Clinton/Kaine	None	No Objections
Florida	29	Trump/Pence	None	Jamie Raskin (D-MD-8)
Georgia	16	Trump/Pence	None	Pramila Jayapal (D-WA-7)
Hawaii	4	3 for Clinton/Kaine	1 for Bernie Sanders	No Objections
Idaho	4	Trump/Pence	None	No Objections
Illinois	20	Clinton/Kaine	None	No Objections
Indiana	11	Trump/Pence	None	No Objections
Iowa	6	Trump/Pence	None	No Objections
Kansas	6	Trump/Pence	None	No Objections
Kentucky	8	Trump/Pence	None	No Objections
Louisiana	8	Trump/Pence	None	No Objections
Maine	4	3 for Clinton/Kaine; 1 for Trump/Pence (Note: Electoral votes for Maine and Nebraska are allocated between statewide vote and congressional districts.)	None	No Objections
Maryland	10	Clinton/Kaine	None	No Objections
Massachusetts	11	Clinton/Kaine	None	No Objections
Michigan	16	Trump/Pence	None	Barbara Lee (D-CA-13)
Minnesota	10	Clinton/Kaine	None	No Objections
Mississippi	6	Trump/Pence	None	Sheila Jackson Lee (D-TX-18)
Missouri	10	Trump/Pence	None	No Objections
Montana	3	Trump/Pence	None	No Objections
Nebraska	5	Trump/Pence	None	No Objections
Nevada	6	Clinton/Kaine	None	No Objections
New Hampshire	4	Clinton/Kaine	None	No Objections
New Jersey	14	Clinton/Kaine	None	No Objections
New Mexico	5	Clinton/Kaine	None	No Objections
New York	29	Clinton/Kaine	None	No Objections
North Carolina	15	Trump/Pence	None	Raul Grijalva (D-AZ-3); Sheila Jackson Lee (D-TX-18)
North Dakota	3	Trump/Pence	None	No Objections
Ohio	18	Trump/Pence	None	No Objections
Oklahoma	7	Trump/Pence	None	No Objections
Oregon	7	Clinton/Kaine	None	No Objections
Pennsylvania	20	Trump/Pence	None	No Objections
Rhode Island	4	Clinton/Kaine	None	No Objections
South Carolina	9	Trump/Pence	None	Sheila Jackson Lee (D-TX-18)
South Dakota	3	Trump/Pence	None	No Objections
Tennessee	11	Trump/Pence	None	No Objections
Texas (Note: With Texas' 36 electoral votes (excluding two faithless electors), Donald Trump and Mike Pence surpassed the 270 electoral vote threshold, securing victory in the electoral vote count.)	38	36 for Trump/Pence	1 for John Kasich; 1 for Ron Paul	No Objections
Utah	6	Trump/Pence	None	No Objections
Vermont	3	Clinton/Kaine	None	No Objections
Virginia	13	Clinton/Kaine	None	No Objections
Washington	12	8 for Clinton/Kaine	3 for Colin Powell; 1 for Faith Spotted Eagle	No Objections
West Virginia	5	Trump/Pence	None	Barbara Lee (D-CA-13)
Wisconsin	10	Trump/Pence	None	Sheila Jackson Lee (D-TX-18)
Wyoming	3	Trump/Pence	None	Maxine Waters (D-CA-43)

*Maine awards electors by congressional district. Clinton won Maine at-large and Maine's first congressional district, while Trump won the second district.

Several representatives had previously attempted to contest Bush's 2004 victory in Ohio. These are Barbara Lee (D-CA-13), Sheila Jackson Lee (D-TX-18), Maxine Waters (D-CA-43), and Raul Grijalva (D-AZ-3). Of these, all except Grijalva had previously contested Bush's 2000 victory in Florida, making them the only Congress people to have contested three different elections.

== See also ==
- 2016 United States presidential election
- First presidential transition of Donald Trump
- First inauguration of Donald Trump
