= List of 2016 United States presidential electors =

This is a list of members of the Electoral College, known as "electors", who cast ballots to elect the President of the United States and Vice President of the United States in the 2016 election. There are 538 electors from the 50 states and the District of Columbia. On Monday December 19, 2016, they formally elected Donald Trump of New York and Mike Pence of Indiana to the presidency and vice presidency respectively.

While every state except Nebraska and Maine chooses its electors by statewide vote, many states require that one elector be designated for each congressional district. These electors are chosen by each party before the general election. A vote for that party then confirms their position. In all states except Nebraska and Maine, the electors are winner-take-all. In Maine and Nebraska within each congressional district one elector is allocated by popular vote; the states' remaining two electors, representing the two U.S. Senate seats, are winner-take-both. Except where otherwise noted, such designations refer to the elector's residence in that district rather than election by the voters of the district. Ultimately, Donald Trump received 304 electoral votes and Hillary Clinton 227, as two faithless electors defected from Trump and five defected from Clinton. Four faithless electors were from Washington (defected from Clinton), two from Texas (defected from Trump) and one from Hawaii (defected from Clinton).

== Alabama ==
Electors: 9, pledged to vote for Donald Trump for President and Mike Pence for Vice President

- Perry O. Hooper Jr., Pike Road, At-large
- Grady H. Thornton, Birmingham, At-large
- Frank Burt Jr., Bay Minette, CD1
- Will B. Sellers, Montgomery, CD2
- James Eldon Wilson, Montgomery, CD3
- Tim Wadsworth, Arley, CD4
- J. Elbert Peters, Huntsville, CD5
- Mary Sue McClurkin, Indian Springs, CD6
- Robert A. Cusanelli, Carrollton, CD7

== Alaska ==
Electors: 3, pledged to vote for the nominees of the Republican Party of the State of Alaska

- Sean Parnell, Palmer — 10th Governor of Alaska
- Jacqueline Tupou, Juneau
- Carolyn Leman, Anchorage

== Arizona ==
Electors: 11, pledged to vote for Donald Trump for President and Mike Pence for Vice President

- J. Foster Morgan, Glendale — youngest elector at 19
- Walter Begay Jr., Kayenta
- Bruce Ash, Tucson – national committeeman
- Sharon Giese, Mesa
- James O'Connor, Scottsdale
- Jerry Hayden, Scottsdale
- Robert Graham, Phoenix – state party chairman
- Edward Robson, Phoenix
- Carole Joyce, Phoenix
- Alberto Gutier, Phoenix
- Jane Pierpoint Lynch, Phoenix

== Arkansas ==
Electors: 6, pledged to vote for Donald Trump for President and Mike Pence for Vice President

- Jonathan Barnett
- Jonelle Fulmer
- Keith Gibson
- Tommy Land
- John Nabholz
- Sharon Wright

== California ==
Electors: 55, voted for Hillary Clinton for President and Tim Kaine for Vice President

- Dustin R. Reed, Concord
- Javier Gonzalez, San Jose
- Shawn E. Terris, Ventura
- John M. Ryan, San Rafael
- Mark W. Headley, Berkeley
- Gail R. Teton-Landis, Santa Barbara
- Faith A. Garamendi, Davis
- Ana A. Huerta, Bakersfield
- Marie S. Torres, Hacienda Heights
- Kathleen R. Scott, Lincoln
- Donna M. Ireland, Pleasanton
- Robert S. Torres, Pomona
- Timothy J. Farley, Martinez
- Christine T. Kehoe, San Diego
- Dorothy N. Vann, Long Beach
- Analea J. Patterson, Sacramento
- Vinzenz J. Koller, Carmel – had indicated that he was undecided, unsuccessfully sued California over law forcing electors to vote along party lines
- David S. Warmuth, Pasadena
- Janine V. Bera, Elk Grove
- Andrew R. Krakoff, Orinda
- Karen D. Waters, Inglewood
- Sandra M. Aduna, Laguna Woods
- Katherine A. Lyon, Coronado
- Shirley N. Weber, San Diego
- Saundra G. Andrews, Oakland
- John P. MacMurray, La Habra
- Denise B. Wells, Victorville
- Jane C. Block, Riverside
- Sheldon Malchicoff, Westlake Village
- Gregory H. Willenborg, Los Angeles
- Ed Buck, West Hollywood
- Nury Martinez, San Fernando
- Laurence S. Zakson, Los Angeles
- Francine P. Busby, Cardiff
- Gwen Moore, Los Angeles
- Laphonza R. Butler, Los Angeles
- Cathy A. Morris, Rancho Cucamonga
- Benjamin Cardenas, Montebello
- Stephen J. Natoli, Visalia
- Jacki M. Cisneros, Los Angeles
- Mark A. Olbert, San Carlos
- Raymond L. Cordova, Garden Grove
- Christine Pelosi, San Francisco – signed a letter demanding an intelligence briefing on the alleged Russian hacking
- Steven D. Diebert, Fresno
- Carmen O. Perez, Long Beach
- James A. Donahue, El Cerrito
- Celine G. Purcell, Redwood City
- Patrick F. Drinan, Escondido
- Andres Ramos, Elk Grove
- Susan Eggman, Stockton
- Olivia A. Reyes-Becerra, Stanford
- Eileen Feinstein Mariano, San Francisco
- Priscilla G. Richardson, Cathedral City
- Natalie P. Fortman, Valencia
- Steve Spinner, Atherton

== Colorado ==
Electors: 9, voted for Hillary Clinton for President and Tim Kaine for Vice President

- Celeste Landry, Boulder – replaced Micheal Baca, Denver, who was removed as an elector after voting for John Kasich
- Terry Phillips, Louisville
- Mary Beth Corsentino, Pueblo
- Jerad Sutton, Greeley – had indicated he would not vote for Hillary Clinton
- Robert Nemanich, Colorado Springs – had in early December not planned to vote for Hillary Clinton
- Amy Drayer, Greenwood Village
- Ann Knollman, Arvada
- Sen. Rollie Heath, Boulder
- Hon. Polly Baca, Denver – had indicated she would cast her vote for an alternative Republican candidate

== Connecticut ==
Electors: 7, pledged to vote for Hillary Clinton for President and Tim Kaine for Vice President

- Barbara Gordon, West Hartford
- Ellen Nurse, Hartford
- Edward Piazza, New Haven
- Tyisha Walker, New Haven
- Christopher Rosario, Bridgeport
- Robert Godfrey, Danbury
- Steven Jones, Tolland

== Delaware ==
Electors: 3, pledged to vote for Hillary Clinton for President and Tim Kaine for Vice President

- Lynn Fuller
- Lydia York
- Linda Cavanaugh

== District of Columbia ==
Electors: 3, pledged to vote for Hillary Clinton for President and Tim Kaine for Vice President

- Anita Bonds – signed a letter demanding an intelligence briefing on the alleged Russian hacking
- Jack Evans
- Franklin Garcia

== Florida ==
Electors: 29, pledged to vote for Donald Trump for President and Mike Pence for Vice President

- Tony Ledbetter
- Pam Bondi — 37th Attorney General of Florida
- Sharon Day
- Adrien "Bo" Rivard
- Larry Ahern
- Brian Ballard
- Kristy Banks
- Michael Barnett
- Lizbeth Benacquisto
- Robin Bernstein
- John Browning
- Dena DeCamp
- Nick DiCeglie
- Jeremy Evans
- John Falconetti
- Peter Feaman
- Kat Gates-Skipper
- Joe Gruters
- Debbie Hannifan
- Blaise Ingoglia
- Mike Moberley
- Susan Moore
- Joe Negron
- Clint Pate
- Ray Rodrigues
- Carlos Trujillo
- Robert Watkins
- Susie Wiles
- Christian Ziegler

== Georgia ==
Electors: 16, pledged to vote for Donald Trump for President and Mike Pence for Vice President

- Bruce Allen Azevedo
- Brian K Burdette
- Lott Harris Dill
- John David Elliott
- James Randolph Evans
- Bobbie D. Frantz
- Linda D. Herren
- Rachel Blackstone Little
- Deborah M. McCord
- Michael Neil McNeely
- Mary L. Padgett
- Neil L. Pruitt
- Joshua Kirk Shook
- Frank B. Strickland
- John Padgett – replaced Baoky Nguyen Vu, who resigned
- John B. White

== Hawaii ==
Electors: 4, pledged to vote for Hillary Clinton for President and Tim Kaine for Vice President
Clinton received three votes and Bernie Sanders received one for President
Kaine received three votes and Elizabeth Warren received one for Vice President

=== Electors ===
- John Bickel
- Janice Bond
- Marie "Dolly" Strazar
- David Mulinix, voted for Bernie Sanders and Elizabeth Warren

=== First alternates ===
- Kainoa Kaumeheiwa-Rego
- Eileen McKee
- Michael Golojuch Sr.
- Yvonne Lau

=== Second alternates ===
- Carolyn Golojuch
- Julie Patten
- Michele Golojuch
- Leo Caries

== Idaho ==
Electors: 4, pledged to vote for Donald Trump for President and Mike Pence for Vice President

- Rod Beck
- Caleb Lakey
- Jennifer Locke
- C.A. "Skip" Smyser

Layne Bangerter and Melinda Smyser were originally named as two of Idaho's electors. Because federal employees are ineligible to serve as electors, Rod Beck and C.A. "Skip" Smyser (Melinda's husband) were appointed as their replacements.

== Illinois ==
Electors: 20, pledged to vote for Hillary Clinton for President and Tim Kaine for Vice President

- Toni Preckwinkle
- Carrie Austin
- Silvana Tabares
- Jesús "Chuy" García
- Pam Cullerton
- Nancy Shepherdson – signed a letter demanding an intelligence briefing on the alleged Russian hacking
- Vera Davis
- William Marovitz – signed a letter demanding an intelligence briefing on the alleged Russian hacking
- Barbara Flynn Currie
- John R. Daley
- Michelle Mussman
- Lauren Beth Gash, Highland Park
- Kevin Duffy Blackburn, Joliet
- Jerry Costello, Belleville
- Carol Ammons
- Mark Guethle, North Aurora
- Flint Taylor, McLeansboro
- John Nelson, Rockford
- Don Johnston, Rock Island

== Indiana ==
Electors: 11, pledged to vote for Donald Trump for President and Mike Pence for Vice President

- Stephanie Beckley, Jamestown
- Daniel Bortner, Bedford
- Laura Campbell, Carmel
- Jeff Cardwell, Indianapolis
- Donald L. Hayes, Jasper
- Randall Kirkpatrick, Ligonier
- Ethan E. Manning, Peru
- Macy Kelly Mitchell, Indianapolis
- Edwin J. Simcox, Fishers
- Kevin Steen, Muncie
- Chuck Williams, Valparaiso

== Iowa ==
Electors: 6, pledged to vote for Donald Trump for President and Mike Pence for Vice President

- James Whitmer
- Don Kass
- Dylan Keller
- Alan Braun
- Kurt Brown
- Polly Granzow

== Kansas ==
Electors: 6, pledged to vote for Donald Trump for President and Mike Pence for Vice President

- Ashley J. McMillan, Concordia – state party vice chairwoman
- Helen Van Etten, Topeka – national committeewoman
- Mark Kahrs, Wichita – national committeeman
- Ron Estes, Wichita – Kansas State Treasurer
- Clayton L. Barker, Leawood – state party executive director
- Kelly Arnold, Wichita – state party chairman

== Kentucky ==
Electors: 8, pledged to vote for Donald Trump for President and Mike Pence for Vice President

- Jim Skaggs
- David Disponett
- Robert Duncan
- Michael Carter
- Scott Lasley
- Walter Reichert
- Mary Singleton
- Troy Sheldon

== Louisiana ==
Electors: 8, pledged to vote for Donald Trump for President and Mike Pence for Vice President

=== Electors ===
- Chris Trahan, CD1
- Lloyd Harsch, CD2
- Charles Buckels, CD3
- Louis Avalone, CD4
- Kay Katz, CD5
- Lennie Rhys, CD6
- Garret Monti, At-large
- Scott Wilfong, At-large

=== Alternates ===
- Candy Maness, CD1
- Jennifer Madsen, CD2
- Christian Gil, CD3
- Constance Diane Long, CD4
- Verne Breland, CD5
- Glenda Pollard, CD6
- John Batt, At-large
- Raymond Griffin, At-large

== Maine ==
Electors: 4

=== Democratic Party ===
3, pledged to vote for Hillary Clinton for President and Tim Kaine for Vice President

- (1st) Diane Denk, Kennebunk
- (At-large) David Bright, Dixmont – voted for Bernie Sanders, then voted for Hillary Clinton in a second round of voting
- (At-large) Sam Shapiro, Winslow

=== Republican Party ===
1, pledged to vote for Donald Trump for President and Mike Pence for Vice President

- (2nd) Rick Bennett, Oxford

== Maryland ==
Electors: 10, pledged to vote for Hillary Clinton for President and Tim Kaine for Vice President

- Lesley Israel
- Robert Leonard
- Lillian Holmes
- Salome Peters
- Hagner Mister
- Claudia Martin
- Courtney Watson – signed a letter demanding an intelligence briefing on the alleged Russian hacking
- Karen Britto
- Susan Ness
- Wayne Rogers

== Massachusetts ==
Electors: 11, pledged to vote for Hillary Clinton for President and Tim Kaine for Vice President

- Nazda Alam
- Mary Gail Cokkinias
- Marie Turley
- Dori Dean
- Donna Smith
- Cheryl Cumings
- Marc R. Pacheco
- Curtis Lemay
- Jason Palitsch
- Paul Yorkis
- Parwez Wahid

== Michigan ==
Electors: 16, pledged to vote for Donald Trump for President and Mike Pence for Vice President

- John Haggard
- Jack Holmes
- Kelly Mitchell
- Judy Rapanos
- Henry Hatter
- Robert Weitt
- Wyckham Seelig
- Ross Ensign
- Michael Banerian
- Brian Fairbrother
- Ken Crider
- Mary Vaughn
- Jim Rhoades — motorcycle lobbyist
- William Rauwerdink
- Hank Fuhs
- Joseph Guzman

== Minnesota ==
Electors: 10, voted for Hillary Clinton for President and Tim Kaine for Vice President

- Fred Knudson, Owatonna
- Roger Gehrke, Eagan
- Marge Hoffa, Minnetonka
- Raymond Hess, Maplewood
- Jill Garcia, Minneapolis – replaced Muhammad Abdurrahman, faithless elector after he voted for Bernie Sanders and Tulsi Gabbard
- Betsy O'Berry, Ramsey
- Mike Wammer, Lake Eunice Township
- Mary Murphy, Hermantown
- Jules Goldstein, St. Paul
- Sherrie Pugh, Mound

== Mississippi ==
Electors: 6, pledged to vote for Donald Trump for President and Mike Pence for Vice President

- Ann Hebert
- Joe F. Sanderson Jr.
- Bradley R. White
- J. Kelley Williams
- William G. Yates Jr.
- Wirt Yerger

== Missouri ==
Electors: 10, pledged to vote for Donald Trump for President and Mike Pence for Vice President

- Tim Dreste (1st)
- Jan DeWeese (2nd)
- Hector Maldonado (3rd) – says he will vote for Trump stating: "I took an oath once to become a U.S. citizen (...) on August 14, 1995, that was the first oath that I have taken to support the U.S. Constitution. A year later I took the oath again, to support the duties of being an officer in the U.S. Army. This was the third oath that I have taken to execute what I promised to do."
- Sherry Kuttenkuler (4th)
- Casey Crawford (5th)
- Tom Brown (6th)
- Cherry Warren (7th)
- Scott Clark (8th)
- Al Rotskoff
- Susie Johnson

== Montana ==
Electors: 3, pledged to vote for Donald Trump for President and Mike Pence for Vice President

=== Electors ===
- Thelma Baker
- Nancy Ballance
- Dennis Scranton

=== Alternates ===
- Vondene Kopetski
- Becky Stockton
- Thomas Tuck

== Nebraska ==
Electors: 5, pledged to vote for Donald Trump for President and Mike Pence for Vice President

- Craig Safranek, Merna
- Chuck Conrad, Hastings
- John Dinkel, Norfolk
- Phil Belin, Omaha
- Paul Burger, Kearney

== Nevada ==
Electors: 6, pledged to vote for Hillary Clinton for President and Tim Kaine for Vice President

- Dayananda Prabhu Rachakonda
- Larry Jackson
- Joetta Brown
- Paul James Catha II
- Greg Gardella
- Teresa Benitez-Thompson

== New Hampshire ==
Electors: 4, pledged to vote for Hillary Clinton for President and Tim Kaine for Vice President

The only all-female slate of electors, all four of whom are the first Democratic women to hold their elected offices

- Terie Norelli – signed a letter demanding an intelligence briefing on the alleged Russian hacking
- Bev Hollingworth – signed a letter demanding an intelligence briefing on the alleged Russian hacking
- Dudley Dudley – signed a letter demanding an intelligence briefing on the alleged Russian hacking
- Carol Shea-Porter – signed a letter demanding an intelligence briefing on the alleged Russian hacking

== New Jersey ==
Electors: 14, pledged to vote for Hillary Clinton for President and Tim Kaine for Vice President

- Alaa R. Abdelaziz, Paterson
- Tahsina Ahmed, Haledon — the first Bangladeshi-American female to hold elected office in the nation
- Anthony Cureton, Englewood
- Lizette Delgado-Polanco, Ewing
- Edward Farmer, Piscataway
- Christopher D. James, East Orange
- LeRoy J. Jones Jr., East Orange
- Retha R. Onitiri, Clarksburg
- Marlene Prieto, Secaucus
- Ronald G. Rios, Carteret
- Hetty M. Rosenstein, South Orange
- Kelly Steward Maer, Manasquan
- Mary Ann Wardlow, Lawnside
- Heriberta Loretta Winters, Williamstown

== New Mexico ==
Electors: 5, pledged to vote for Hillary Clinton for President and Tim Kaine for Vice President

- Roxanne Allen, Albuquerque – Democratic ward chairwoman
- Noyola Padilla Archibeque, Las Vegas – chairwoman of the San Miguel Federation of Democratic Women
- John Padilla, Albuquerque – Bernie Sanders delegate to the 2016 Democratic National Convention and Democratic ward chairman
- Lorraine Spradling, Los Lunas – grassroots organizer
- E. Paul Torres, Isleta Pueblo

== New York ==
Electors: 29, pledged to vote for Hillary Clinton for President and Tim Kaine for Vice President

- William J. "Bill" Clinton – 42nd President of the United States
- Andrew M. Cuomo — 56th Governor of New York
- Kathy C. Hochul — Lieutenant Governor of New York
- Thomas P. DiNapoli — 54th Comptroller of New York
- Eric T. Schneiderman — 65th Attorney General of New York
- Carl E. Heastie
- Andrea Stewart-Cousins
- Bill de Blasio — 109th Mayor of New York City
- Letitia A. James
- Scott M. Stringer
- Melissa Mark-Viverito
- Byron W. Brown
- Christine C. Quinn
- Basil A. Smikle, Jr.
- Melissa Sklarz
- Mario F. Cilento
- Rhonda Weingarten
- George K. Gresham
- Daniel F. Donohue
- Stuart H. Appelbaum
- Gary S. LaBarbera
- Lovely A. Warren
- Stephanie A. Miner
- Katherine M. Sheehan
- Anastasia M. Somoza
- Sandra Ung
- Rubén Díaz Jr.
- Hazel L. Ingram — the oldest elector, at 93
- Rachel D. Gold

== North Carolina ==
Electors: 15, voted for Donald Trump for President and Mike Pence for Vice President

- Linda Harper
- Charles Staley
- Karen Kozel
- Martha Jenkins
- Celeste Stanley
- Donald Webb
- Robert Muller
- Jennifer Dunbar
- Andrea Arterburn
- Glenn Pinckney Sr.
- Mark Delk
- David Speight
- Ann Sullivan
- Lee Green
- David Smudski

== North Dakota ==
Electors: 3, pledged to vote for Donald Trump for President and Mike Pence for Vice President

- Leon Helland
- John Olson
- Duane Mutch
- Bev Clayburgh

== Ohio ==
Electors: 18, pledged to vote for Donald Trump for President and Mike Pence for Vice President

- Marilyn Ashcraft
- Curt Braden
- Rob Scott – replaced Christina Hagan, who resigned position, possibly ineligible, being in the Ohio General Assembly
- Lee-Ann Johnson
- Ralph King
- Alex Triantafilou
- Mary Anne Christie
- Corey Schottenstein
- Jim Dicke II
- Cheryl Blakely
- Richard Jones
- Tom Coyne
- Judy Westbrock
- Leonard Hubert
- Tracey Winbush
- James Wert
- Brian Schottenstein
- Ed Crawford

== Oklahoma ==
Electors: 7, pledged to vote for Donald Trump for President and Mike Pence for Vice President

- David Oldham
- Teresa Lyn Turner
- Mark Thomas
- Bobby Cleveland
- Lauree Elizabeth Marshall
- Charles W. Potts
- George W. Wiland, Jr.

== Oregon ==
Electors: 7, pledged to vote for Hillary Clinton for President and Tim Kaine for Vice President

- Frank James Dixon, Portland
- Karen A. Packer, Newberg
- Austin Folnagy, Klamath Falls
- Leon H. Coleman, Aloha
- Harry W. "Sam" Sappington III, Albany
- Timothy Norman Powers Rowan, Portland
- Laura Gillpatrick, Eugene

== Pennsylvania ==
Electors: 20, pledged to vote for Donald Trump for President and Mike Pence for Vice President

- Bob Asher
- Mary Barket
- Robert Bozzuto
- Theodore "Ted" Christian
- Michael Downing
- Margaret Ferraro
- Robert Gleason
- Christopher Gleason
- Joyce Haas
- Ash Khare
- James McErlane
- Elstina Pickett
- Patricia Poprik
- Andrew Reilly
- Carol Sides
- Glora "Lee" Snover
- Richard Stewart
- Lawrence Tabas
- Christine Toretti
- Carolyn Bunny Welsh

== Rhode Island ==
Electors: 4, pledged to vote for Hillary Clinton for President and Tim Kaine for Vice President

- Clay Pell – signed a letter demanding an intelligence briefing on the alleged Russian hacking
- Grace Diaz
- L. Susan Weiner
- Frank J. Montanaro

== South Carolina ==
Electors: 9, voted for Donald Trump for President and Mike Pence for Vice President

- Glenn McCall
- Matt Moore
- Terry Hardesty
- Jim Ulmer
- Brenda Bedenbaugh
- Bill Conley
- Shery Smith
- Moye Graham
- Jerry Rovner

== South Dakota ==
Electors: 3, pledged to vote for Donald Trump for President and Mike Pence for Vice President

- Marty Jackley — 30th Attorney General of South Dakota
- Dennis Daugaard — 32nd Governor of South Dakota
- Matt Michels — 38th Lieutenant Governor of South Dakota

== Tennessee ==
Electors: 11, pledged to vote for Donald Trump for President and Mike Pence for Vice President

- Beth Scott Clayton Amos, Nashville, At-large – state executive committee member, member of the Board of the Estate Planning Council of Middle Tennessee
- Joey Jacobs, Brentwood, At-large – president and CEO of Acadia Healthcare
- Jason Mumpower, Bristol, CD1
- Susan Mills, Maryville, CD2
- Liz Holiway, Harriman, CD3
- Lynne Davis, Lascassas, CD4
- Tom Lawless, Nashville, CD5 – says he will vote for Trump stating: "Hell will freeze and we will be skating on the lava before I change. (...) He won the state and I have pledged and gave my word that that is what I would do. And I will not break it."
- Mike Callahan, Monterey, CD6
- Pat Allen, Clarksville, CD7
- Shannon Haynes, Alamo, CD8
- Drew Daniel, Memphis, CD9

== Texas ==
Electors: 38, pledged to vote for Donald Trump for President and Mike Pence for Vice President
One elector, Christopher Suprun, pledged not to vote for Donald Trump
Ron Paul and John Kasich each received one vote for President
Carly Fiorina received one vote for Vice President

- Candy Noble, At-large
- Fred Farias, At-large
- Marty Rhymes, CD1
- Thomas Moon, CD2
- Carol Sewell, CD3
- John E. Harper, CD4
- Sherrill Lenz, CD5
- Nicholas Ciggelakis, CD6
- Will Hickman, CD7
- Landon Estay, CD8
- Rex Lamb, CD9
- Rosemary Edwards, CD10
- Matt Stringer, CD11
- Debra Coffey, CD12 – replaced Shellie Surles, ruled ineligible
- Benona Love, CD13 – replaced Melissa Kalka, ruled ineligible
- Sherry Clark, CD14 – replaced Kenneth Clark, ruled ineligible
- Sandra Cararas, CD15
- David Thackston, CD16
- Robert Bruce, CD17
- Margie Forster, CD18
- Scott Mann, CD19
- Marian K. Stanko, CD20
- Curtis Nelson, CD21
- Tina Gibson, CD22
- Ken Muenzler, CD23
- Alexander Kim, CD24
- Virginia Abel, CD25
- John Dillard, CD26
- Tom Knight, CD27
- Marian Knowlton, CD28
- Rex Teter, CD29
- Christopher Suprun, CD30 – voted for John Kasich and Carly Fiorina; on May 14, 2016, at the state party convention in Dallas, per state party rule no. 39 on presidential electors, Suprun filed with the Chairman of the National Nominations Committee an affidavit in writing as to his commitment to vote for the Republican Party's nominees for President and Vice President, but later reneged on this commitment, stating in a New York Times op-ed that he would not vote for Trump
- Jon Jewett, CD31
- Susan Fischer, CD32
- Lauren Byers, CD33
- William "Bill" Greene, CD34 – voted for Ron Paul and Mike Pence; on May 14, 2016, at the state party convention in Dallas, per state party rule no. 39 on presidential electors, Greene filed with the Chairman of the National Nominations Committee an affidavit in writing as to his commitment to vote for the Republican Party's nominees for President and Vice President. However, Greene testified before the Elections Committee in the Texas House of Representatives on March 27, 2017, his belief that "a constitutional oath supersedes any pledge (...) and my oath was to the Constitution of the State of Texas and the U.S. Constitution"
- Mary Lou Erben, CD35
- Janis Holt, CD 36 – replaced Arthur Sisneros, who resigned from the Electoral College rather than vote for Trump

== Utah ==
Electors: 6, pledged to vote for Donald Trump for President and Mike Pence for Vice President

- Cherilyn Eagar
- Kris Kimball
- Jeremy Jenkins
- Peter Greathouse
- Chia-Chi Teng
- Richard Snelgrove

== Vermont ==
Electors: 3, pledged to vote for Hillary Clinton for President and Tim Kaine for Vice President

- Peter Shumlin — 81st Governor of Vermont
- Martha Allen
- Tim Jerman

== Virginia ==
Electors: 13, pledged to vote for Hillary Clinton for President and Tim Kaine for Vice President

- Bethany J. Rowland, Chesapeake
- Debra Stevens Fitzgerald, Harrisonburg
- James Harold Allen Boyd, Culpeper
- Jasper L. Hendricks, III, Pamplin
- Jeanette C. Sarver, Dublin
- K. James O'Connor, Jr., Manassas
- Kathy Stewart Shupe, Sterling
- Keith A. Scarborough, Woodbridge
- Lashrecse D. Aird, Petersburg
- Susan Johnson Rowland, Chesapeake
- Terry C. Frye, Bristol
- Virginia L. Peters, Alexandria
- Vivian J. Paige, Norfolk

== Washington ==
Electors: 12, pledged to vote for Hillary Clinton for President and Tim Kaine for Vice President
Clinton received eight votes, Colin Powell received three and Faith Spotted Eagle received one
Kaine received eight votes and Elizabeth Warren, Susan Collins, Maria Cantwell and Winona LaDuke each received one for Vice President

- Elizabeth Caldwell – voted for Clinton and Kaine
- Dan Carpita – voted for Clinton and Kaine
- Peter Bret Chiafalo – voted for Colin Powell and Elizabeth Warren
- Levi Guerra – voted for Colin Powell and Maria Cantwell; had stated she planned to vote for a Republican "consensus candidate"
- Eric Herde – voted for Clinton and Kaine
- Joshua Ivey – voted for Clinton and Kaine
- Esther John – voted for Colin Powell and Susan Collins
- Julie Johnson – voted for Clinton and Kaine
- Varisha Khan – voted for Clinton and Kaine
- Chris Porter – voted for Clinton and Kaine
- Robert Satiacum, Jr. – member of the Puyallup Tribe, refused to vote for Clinton and Kaine; voted for Faith Spotted Eagle and Winona LaDuke
- Phillip Tyler – voted for Clinton and Kaine

== West Virginia ==
Electors: 5, pledged to vote for Donald Trump for President and Mike Pence for Vice President

- Ron Foster
- Patrick Morrisey — 34th Attorney General of West Virginia
- Ann Urling
- Mac Warner
- Bill Cole

== Wisconsin ==
Electors: 10, pledged to vote for Donald Trump for President and Mike Pence for Vice President

- Kim Travis, Williams Bay, CD1
- Kim Babler, Madison, CD2
- Brian Westrate, Fall Creek, CD3 – tweeted that he will vote for Donald Trump
- Brad Courtney, Whitefish Bay, CD4
- Kathy Kiernan, Richfield, CD5
- Dan Feyen, Fond du Lac, CD6
- Kevin Hermening, Wausau, CD7 – replacing Jim Miller, Hayward
- Bill Berglund, Sturgeon Bay, CD8
- Steve King, Janesville, At-large
- Mary Buestrin, River Hills, At-large

== Wyoming ==
Electors: 3, pledged to vote for Donald Trump for President and Mike Pence for Vice President

- Bonnie Foster
- Teresa Richards
- Karl Allred

== See also ==
- Faithless electors in the 2016 United States presidential election
- Federalist Papers

Preceded by 2012	Electoral College (United States); 2016	Succeeded by 2020
