= Satiacum =

Satiacum is a Puyallup surname. Notable people with the surname include:

- Robert Satiacum (1929–1991), Puyallup tribal leader
- Robert Satiacum Jr. (born 1960), Puyallup politician
