= 2016 United States presidential election in Washington (state) =

- November 8, 2016
- Turnout: 78.76% (of registered voters) ▼2.49%
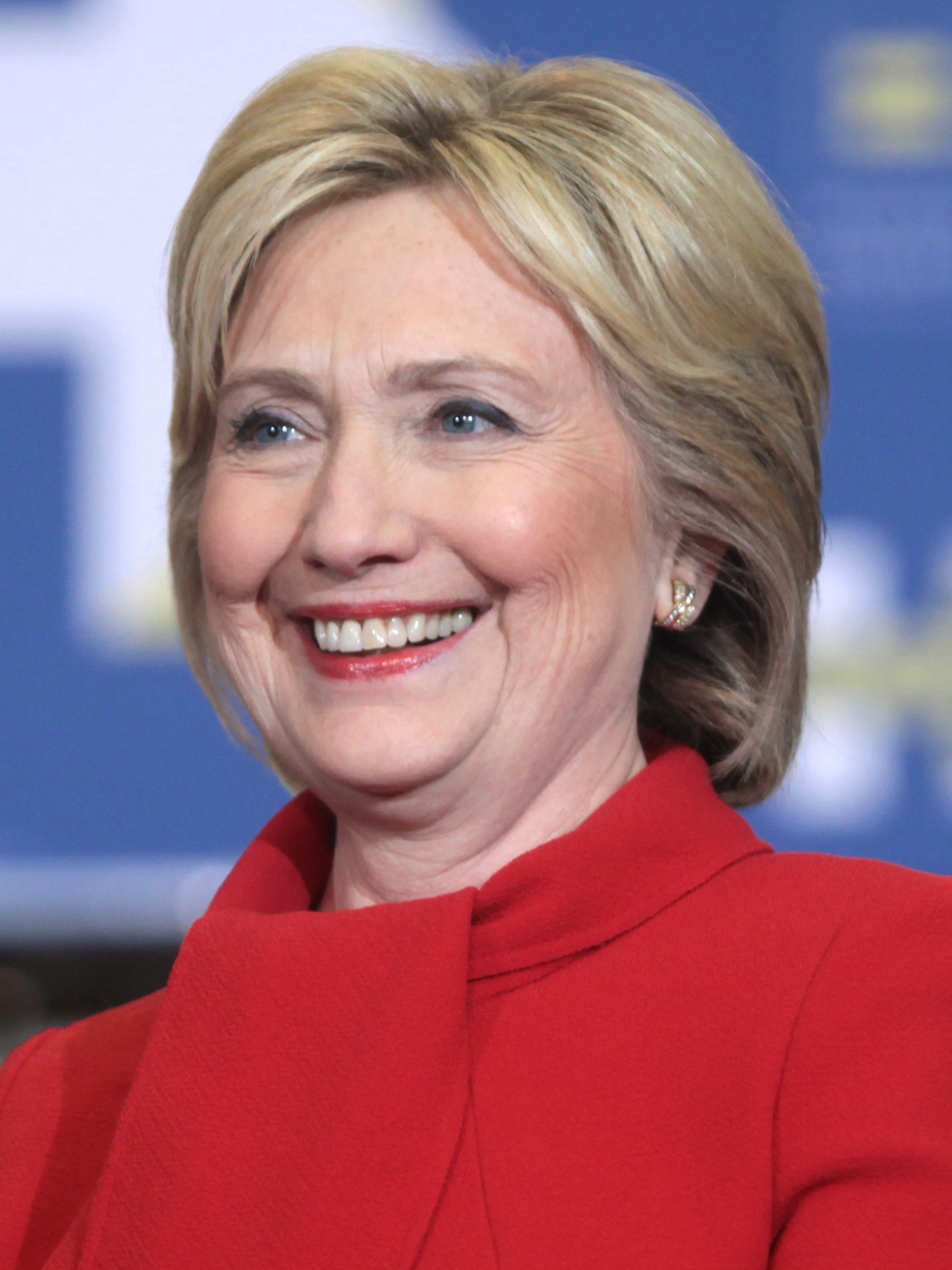

Nominee	Hillary Clinton	Donald Trump
Party	Democratic	Republican
Home state	New York	New York
Running mate	Tim Kaine	Mike Pence
Electoral vote	8 (Note: Clinton and Kaine earned 12 pledged electoral votes, but lost four to faithless electors. Three electors voted for Colin Powell for president and Elizabeth Warren, Maria Cantwell, and Susan Collins for vice president, while Robert Satiacum Jr. voted for Faith Spotted Eagle for president and Winona LaDuke for vice president.)	0
Popular vote	1,742,718	1,221,747
Percentage	52.54%	36.83%

Clinton
30–40%
40–50%
50–60%
60–70%
70–80%
80–90%
90–100%
Trump
30–40%
40–50%
50–60%
60–70%
70–80%
80–90%
90–100%
Tie/No Data
President before election
Barack Obama
Democratic
Elected President
Donald Trump
Republican

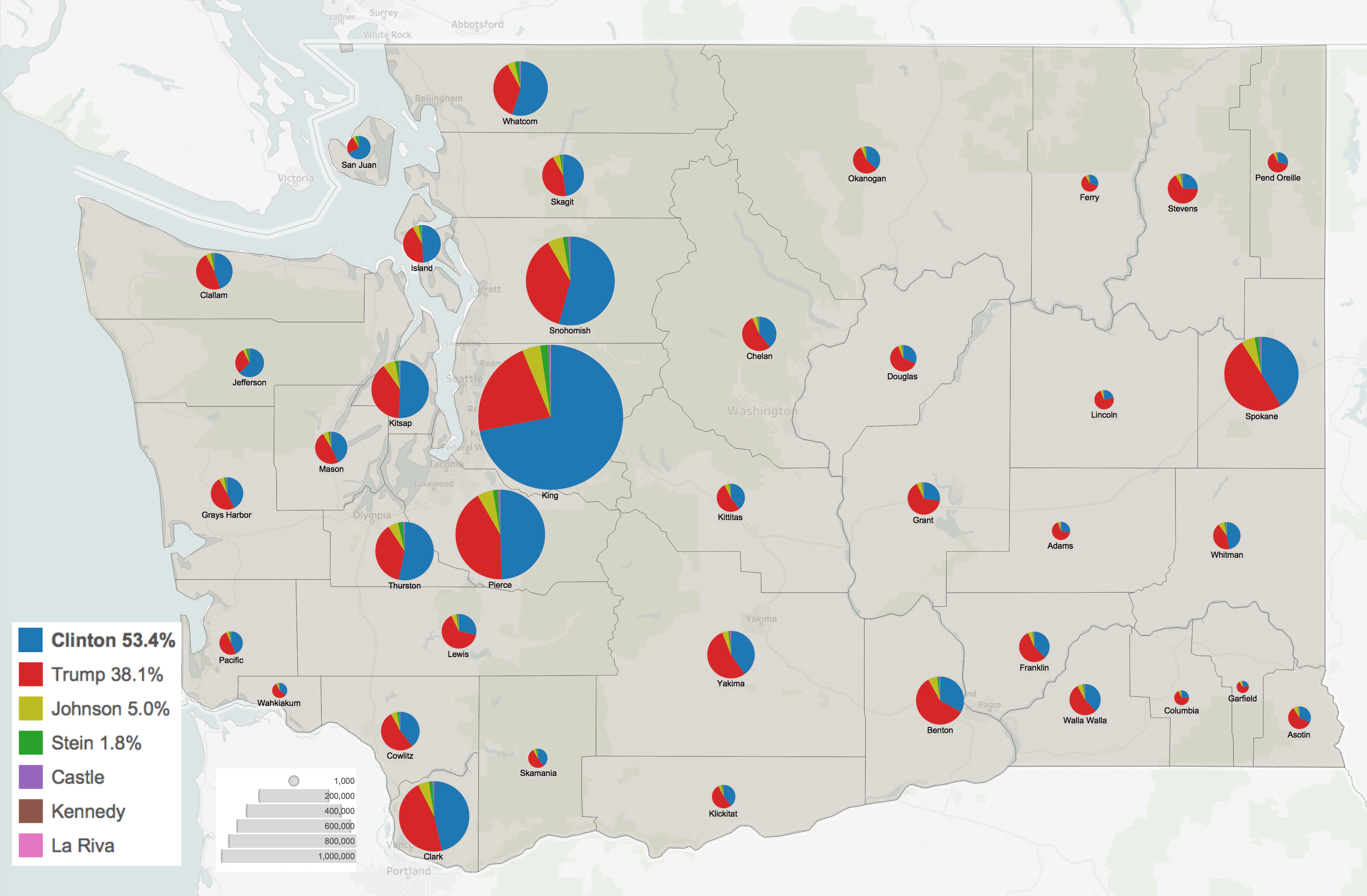
Results by county showing number of votes by size and candidates by color

Treemap of the popular vote by county

The 2016 United States presidential election in Washington took place on November 8, 2016, as part of the 2016 United States presidential election. Washington was won by Hillary Clinton, who won the state with 52.54% of the vote over Donald Trump's 36.83%, a margin of 15.71%. All of the state's 12 electoral votes were assigned to Clinton, though four defected. Trump prevailed in the presidential election nationally.

In the presidential primaries, Washington voters chose the Republican Party's nominee; the Democratic Party used the caucus system, and the Green Party's nominee was chosen in a convention. Although Clinton's 52.5% percent of the vote was a reduction from Barack Obama's 56.2% in 2012, Trump receiving an even greater drop in percentage compared to Mitt Romney's 41.3% made Washington one of 11 states (along with the District of Columbia) where Clinton improved upon Obama's margin of victory. This was the first presidential election in which the Republican Party won Grays Harbor and Pacific counties since 1928 and 1952, respectively.

This election was also the first time that the Republican Party had won Cowlitz County since 1980, and the first time they had won Mason County since 1984. Additionally, Trump became the first Republican ever to win the White House without carrying Island County, as well as the first to do so without carrying Whitman County since William McKinley in 1900. Despite Clinton's victory, four Democratic electors defected: Three voted for former U.S. secretary of state Colin Powell, making him the first African-American Republican to receive electoral votes, while Native American activist Robert Satiacum Jr. cast his vote for fellow activist Faith Spotted Eagle, making her the first Native American to receive an electoral vote for president.

== Primaries and Caucuses ==
Washington has voted for the Democratic candidate in every presidential election since 1988. While the state's Senate was majority Republican in 2016, both of Washington's United States Senators are Democrats, as well as a majority of the state's U.S. House delegation. Barack Obama defeated John McCain by 17.18% in 2008 and Mitt Romney by 14.87% in 2012.

=== Primary elections ===
==== Democratic caucus ====
County results of the Washington Democratic presidential caucus, 2016. Bernie Sanders

Bernie Sanders bested Hillary Clinton in the Democratic presidential caucus on March 26, 2016:

The state also held a non-binding presidential primary on May 24, the same date as the state's Republican primary. Hillary Clinton won the preference vote.

Washington Democratic caucuses, March 26, 2016
Candidate	District delegates		Estimated delegates		
Candidate	Count	Percentage	Pledged	Unpledged	Total
Bernie Sanders	19,159	72.72%	74	0	74
Hillary Clinton	7,140	27.10%	27	10	37
Others					
Uncommitted	46	0.18%	0	7	7
Total	26,345	100%	101	17	118

Washington Democratic primary, May 24, 2016
Candidate	Popular vote		Estimated delegates		
Candidate	Count	Percentage	Pledged	Unpledged	Total
Hillary Clinton	420,461	52.38%	0	0	0
Bernie Sanders	382,293	47.62%	0	0	0
Others					
Uncommitted					
Total	802,754	100%	0	0	0
Source: Washington Secretary of State - Official Results

==== Republican primary ====
Four candidates appeared on the Republican presidential primary ballot on May 24, 2016:

- Ben Carson (withdrawn)
- Ted Cruz (withdrawn)
- John Kasich (withdrawn)
- Donald Trump

Washington Republican primary, May 24, 2016
Candidate	Votes	Percentage	Actual delegate count		
Candidate	Votes	Percentage	Bound	Unbound	Total
Donald Trump	455,023	75.46%	41	0	41
Ted Cruz (withdrawn)	65,172	10.81%	0	0	0
John Kasich (withdrawn)	58,954	9.78%	0	0	0
Ben Carson (withdrawn)	23,849	3.96%	0	0	0
Uncommitted			3	0	3
Unprojected delegates:			0	0	0
Total:	602,998	100.00%	44	0	44
Source: The Green Papers

==== Green convention ====
This state's Green Party state convention was on May 15. Ballots were emailed to members within a week after the convention.

Washington Green Party Convention, May 15, 2016.
Candidate	Votes	Percentage	National delegates
Jill Stein	-	91.7	5
William Kreml	-	-	-
Sedinam Kinamo Christin Moyowasifza Curry	-	-	-
Kent Mesplay	-	-	-
Darryl Cherney	-	-	-
Total	-	-	5

== General election ==
=== Predictions ===
Source	Ranking	As of
Los Angeles Times	Safe D	November 6, 2016
CNN	Safe D	November 4, 2016
Cook Political Report	Safe D	November 7, 2016
Electoral-vote.com	Safe D	November 8, 2016
Rothenberg Political Report	Safe D	November 7, 2016
Sabato's Crystal Ball	Safe D	November 7, 2016
RealClearPolitics	Likely D	November 8, 2016
Fox News	Safe D	November 7, 2016

=== Polling ===
Democrat Hillary Clinton won every pre-election poll and all but one by double digits. The average of the final three polls showed Hillary Clinton leading Donald Trump 50.3% to 36%.

=== State voting history ===
Washington joined the Union in November 1889 and has participated in all elections from 1892 onwards.

Since 1900, Washington voted Democratic 51.72 percent of the time and Republican 44.83 percent of the time. Since 1988, Washington had voted for the Democratic Party in each presidential election, and the same was expected to happen in 2016.

=== Results ===
2016 United States presidential election in Washington
Party	Candidate	Votes	%	±%
Democratic	Hillary Clinton Tim Kaine	1,742,718	52.54%	−3.62%
Republican	Donald Trump Mike Pence	1,221,747	36.83%	−4.46%
Libertarian	Gary Johnson Bill Weld	160,879	4.85%	+3.50%
Green	Jill Stein Ajamu Baraka	58,417	1.76%	+1.09%
Constitution	Darrell Castle Scott Bradley	17,623	0.53%	+0.25%
Socialist Workers	Alyson Kennedy Osborne Hart	4,307	0.13%	+0.09%
Socialism and Liberation	Gloria La Riva Eugene Puryear	3,523	0.11%	+0.07%
Write-in		107,805	3.25%	N/A
Total votes		3,317,019	100.00%	N/A

==== By county ====
County	Hillary Clinton Democratic		Donald Trump Republican		Various candidates Other parties		Margin		Total
County	#	%	#	%	#	%	#	%	Total
Adams	1,299	27.16%	3,083	64.47%	400	8.36%	-1,784	-37.31%	4,782
Asotin	3,134	31.42%	5,741	57.56%	1,099	11.02%	-2,607	-26.14%	9,974
Benton	26,360	31.53%	47,194	56.46%	10,038	12.01%	-20,834	-24.92%	83,592
Chelan	13,032	37.85%	18,114	52.61%	3,287	9.55%	-5,082	-14.76%	34,433
Clallam	17,677	43.61%	18,794	46.37%	4,062	10.02%	-1,117	-2.76%	40,533
Clark	92,757	44.49%	92,441	44.34%	23,287	11.17%	316	0.15%	208,485
Columbia	526	23.60%	1,497	67.16%	206	9.24%	-971	-43.56%	2,229
Cowlitz	17,908	37.99%	24,185	51.30%	5,049	10.71%	-6,277	-13.32%	47,142
Douglas	4,918	30.93%	9,603	60.39%	1,380	8.68%	-4,685	-29.46%	15,901
Ferry	1,098	29.78%	2,202	59.72%	387	10.50%	-1,104	-29.94%	3,687
Franklin	8,886	36.10%	13,206	53.65%	2,522	10.25%	-4,320	-17.55%	24,614
Garfield	279	22.39%	851	68.30%	116	9.31%	-572	-45.91%	1,246
Grant	7,810	26.69%	18,518	63.29%	2,930	10.01%	-10,708	-36.60%	29,258
Grays Harbor	12,020	41.02%	14,067	48.01%	3,214	10.97%	-2,047	-6.99%	29,301
Island	20,960	47.34%	18,465	41.71%	4,848	10.95%	2,495	5.64%	44,273
Jefferson	12,656	60.62%	6,037	28.91%	2,186	10.47%	6,619	31.70%	20,879
King	718,322	69.85%	216,339	21.04%	93,789	9.12%	501,983	48.81%	1,028,450
Kitsap	63,156	49.05%	49,018	38.07%	16,596	12.89%	14,138	10.98%	128,770
Kittitas	7,489	38.18%	10,100	51.49%	2,026	10.33%	-2,611	-13.31%	19,615
Klickitat	4,194	37.87%	5,789	52.28%	1,091	9.85%	-1,595	-14.40%	11,074
Lewis	9,654	27.43%	21,992	62.48%	3,553	10.09%	-12,338	-35.05%	35,199
Lincoln	1,244	21.23%	4,108	70.09%	509	8.68%	-2,864	-48.87%	5,861
Mason	11,993	41.35%	13,677	47.16%	3,333	11.49%	-1,684	-5.81%	29,003
Okanogan	6,298	35.87%	9,610	54.74%	1,648	9.39%	-3,312	-18.87%	17,556
Pacific	4,620	42.11%	5,360	48.85%	992	9.04%	-740	-6.74%	10,972
Pend Oreille	1,934	27.57%	4,373	62.33%	709	10.11%	-2,439	-34.76%	7,016
Pierce	172,538	47.92%	146,824	40.78%	40,655	11.29%	25,714	7.14%	360,017
San Juan	7,172	64.42%	2,688	24.14%	1,274	11.44%	4,484	40.27%	11,134
Skagit	26,690	45.97%	24,736	42.60%	6,633	11.42%	1,954	3.37%	58,059
Skamania	2,232	38.29%	2,928	50.23%	669	11.48%	-696	-11.94%	5,829
Snohomish	185,227	52.22%	128,255	36.16%	41,252	11.63%	56,972	16.06%	354,734
Spokane	93,767	39.72%	113,435	48.06%	28,848	12.22%	-19,668	-8.33%	236,050
Stevens	5,767	24.65%	15,161	64.80%	2,467	10.54%	-9,394	-40.15%	23,395
Thurston	68,798	51.27%	48,624	36.23%	16,769	12.50%	20,174	15.03%	134,191
Wahkiakum	832	34.25%	1,344	55.33%	253	10.42%	-512	-21.08%	2,429
Walla Walla	9,694	36.96%	13,651	52.05%	2,883	10.99%	-3,957	-15.09%	26,228
Whatcom	60,340	53.24%	40,599	35.82%	12,400	10.94%	19,741	17.42%	113,339
Whitman	8,146	45.19%	7,403	41.06%	2,479	13.75%	743	4.12%	18,028
Yakima	31,291	39.24%	41,735	52.34%	6,715	8.42%	-10,444	-13.10%	79,741
Totals	1,742,718	52.54%	1,221,747	36.83%	352,554	10.63%	520,971	15.71%	3,317,019

Counties that flipped from Democratic to Republican

- Clallam (largest city: Port Angeles)
- Cowlitz (largest city: Longview)
- Grays Harbor (largest city: Aberdeen)
- Mason (largest city: Shelton)
- Pacific (largest city: Raymond)

Counties that flipped from Republican to Democratic

- Whitman (largest city: Pullman)

==== By congressional district ====
Clinton won seven of ten congressional districts including one that elected a Republican.

District	Clinton	Trump	Representative
1st	54%	38%	Suzan DelBene
2nd	57%	35%	Rick Larsen
3rd	43%	50%	Jaime Herrera Beutler
4th	35%	58%	Dan Newhouse
5th	39%	52%	Cathy McMorris Rodgers
6th	52%	39%	Derek Kilmer
7th	82%	12%	Jim McDermott (114th Congress)
7th	82%	12%	Pramila Jayapal (115th Congress)
8th	48%	45%	Dave Reichert
9th	70%	23%	Adam Smith
10th	51%	40%	Denny Heck

== See also ==
- United States presidential elections in Washington (state)
- First presidency of Donald Trump
- 2016 Democratic Party presidential debates and forums
- 2016 Democratic Party presidential primaries
- 2016 Republican Party presidential debates and forums
- 2016 Republican Party presidential primaries
