= Robert Satiacum =

Puyallup tribal leader (1929–1991)

- Born: 1929; Tacoma, Washington, U.S.
- Died: March 25, 1991 (aged 61–62); Vancouver, British Columbia, Canada
- Occupation: Tribal leader
- Criminal charges: Murder, child molestation

Robert "Bob" Satiacum (1929–March 25, 1991) was a Puyallup tribal leader and an advocate of native treaty fishing rights in the United States. He was convicted in 1982 of attempted murder, embezzlement of tribal funds, and other charges but fled to Canada to avoid a prison term. He was convicted of child molestation in Canada in 1989.

== Early life ==
Satiacum was a 1947 graduate of Lincoln High School in Tacoma, Washington, where he was a star athlete. His son, Robert Satiacum, Jr., was a faithless elector in 2016.

== Fishing rights activism ==
He first came to the public attention in 1954, when he was arrested for illegally fishing in the Puyallup River in Tacoma, Washington. Satiacum was convicted, but the Washington State Supreme Court overturned the conviction. This led to years of legal wranglings over the issue, as well as to "fish-ins" by Satiacum and his cadre of celebrity supporters, most notably Marlon Brando, who was arrested while protesting with him on March 2, 1964; Satiacum would not be detained during the incident, but would be issued a summons to appear in court the following week.

This ultimately culminated in the historic Boldt Decision, which held that treaties signed with native tribes and the federal government in the 1850s entitled the tribes to fifty percent of the total fish harvest.

Satiacum was prominent the 1970 action at Seattle's Fort Lawton that resulted in the creation of United Indians of All Tribes and ultimately of the Daybreak Star Cultural Center.

== Criminal convictions ==
By the early 1980s, Satiacum had "amassed a fortune" which ultimately led to an investigation by the U.S. government.

In 1982 a jury convicted him under the Racketeer Influenced and Corrupt Organizations Act (RICO) for selling cigarettes illegally, for embezzlement of tribal health care funds, and for illegally attempting to control competing businesses through an arson campaign. He was separately convicted of conspiracy to murder his former girlfriend.

Satiacum fled to Canada before he could be sent to prison. He was re-arrested in Canada but in 1987, he became the first U.S. citizen to be granted refugee status in Canada. Satiacum was later found to have molested a 10-year-old girl in Canada and the refugee status decision was subsequently reversed by the Federal Court of Canada. After fleeing Canadian authorities, he was arrested by the Royal Canadian Mounted Police in 1991 and held for deportation to the United States.

== Death ==
He died of a heart attack in Vancouver, British Columbia in 1991 while being held pending extradition to the U.S.

== See also ==
- National Indian Youth Council
