= Faithless electors in the 2016 United States presidential election =

Attempt to prevent the first Trump presidency

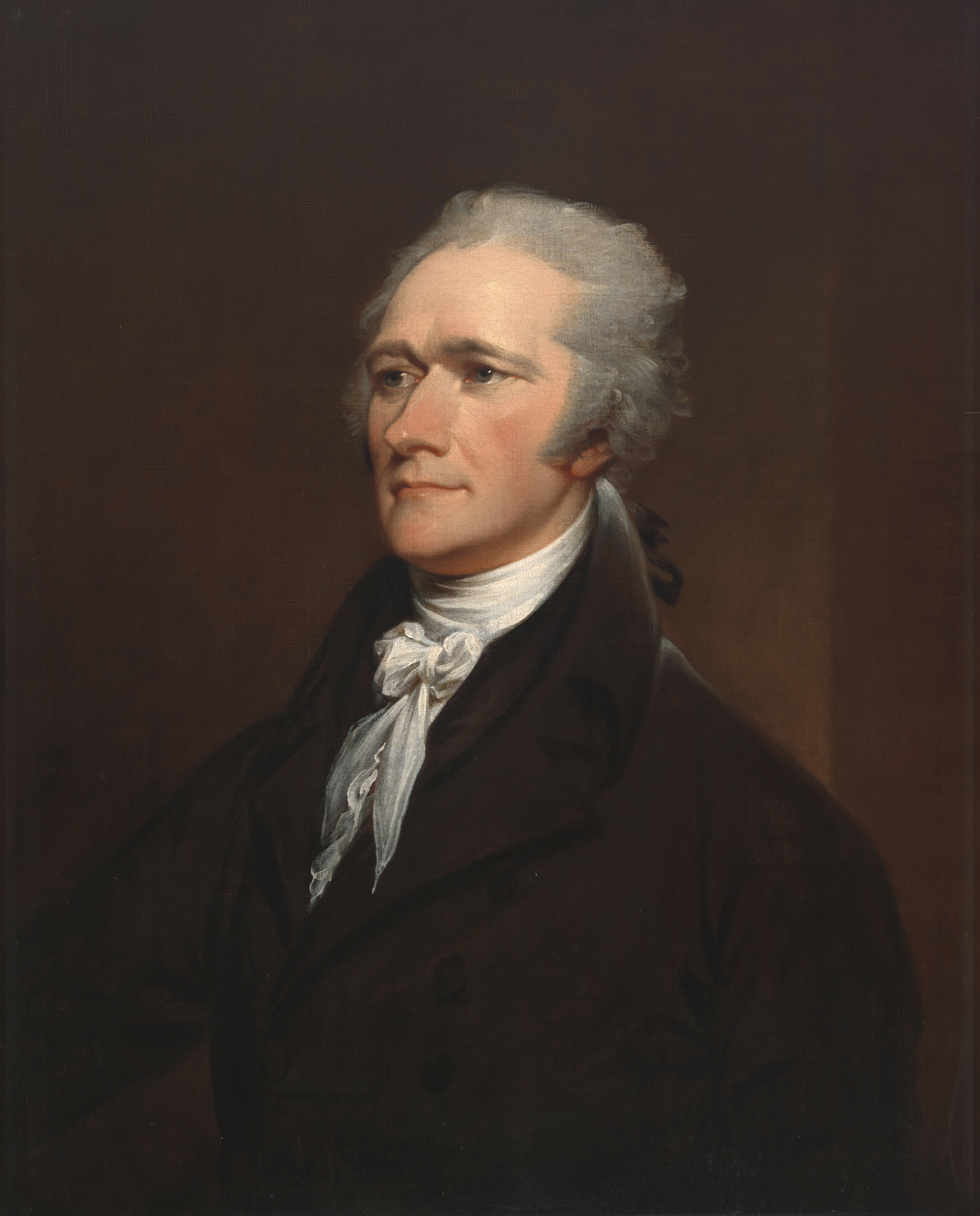
The namesake of the Hamilton Electors, Alexander Hamilton

In the 2016 United States presidential election, ten members of the Electoral College voted or attempted to vote for a candidate different from the ones to whom they were pledged. Three of these votes were invalidated under the faithless elector laws of their respective states, and the elector either subsequently voted for the pledged candidate or was replaced by someone who did. Although there had been a combined total of 155 instances of individual electors voting faithlessly prior to 2016 in over two centuries of previous US presidential elections, 2016 was the first election in over a hundred years in which multiple electors worked to alter the result of the election.

As a result of the seven successfully cast faithless votes, the Democratic Party nominee, Hillary Clinton, lost five of her pledged electors while the Republican Party nominee and then president-elect, Donald Trump, lost two. Three of the faithless electors voted for Colin Powell while John Kasich, Ron Paul, Bernie Sanders, and Faith Spotted Eagle each received one vote. The defections fell well short of the number needed to change the result of the election; only two of the seven defected from the winner, whereas 37 were needed to defect in order to force a contingent election in Congress (a tally of less than 270).

The faithless electors who opposed Donald Trump were part of a movement dubbed the "Hamilton Electors" co-founded by Micheal Baca of Colorado and Bret Chiafalo of Washington. The movement attempted to find 37 Republican electors willing to vote for a different Republican in an effort to deny Donald Trump a majority in the Electoral College and force a contingent election in the House of Representatives. The electors advocated for voting their conscience to prevent the election of someone they viewed as unfit for the presidency as prescribed by Alexander Hamilton in No. 68 of The Federalist Papers. Despite their stated intentions to defeat Donald Trump, these electors cast their votes for persons other than the candidate to whom they were pledged, Trump's opponent Hillary Clinton. By the time they switched their votes away from Trump's opponent, it was numerically impossible to achieve their stated goal as all but 30 of the Trump-pledged electoral votes had already been cast (in different states in the same or later time zones), with 37 votes needed to switch to deny Trump an outright victory in the Electoral College. Electors were subjected to public pressure, including threats of death. The Washington elector who voted for Spotted Eagle did so in protest of Clinton's support for the Dakota Access Pipeline; the vote made Spotted Eagle the first Native American to ever receive an Electoral College vote for president, as well as one of the first two women, along with Clinton, to receive one.

The seven validated faithless votes for president were the most to defect from presidential candidates who were still alive in electoral college history, surpassing the six electors who defected from James Madison in the 1808 election. This number of defections has been exceeded only once: in 1872, a record 63 of 66 electors who were originally pledged to losing candidate Horace Greeley cast their votes for someone else (Greeley had died between election day and the meeting of the Electoral College). The six faithless vice-presidential votes in 2016 are short of the record for that office, without considering whether the vice-presidential candidates were still living, as multiple previous elections have had more than six faithless vice-presidential votes; in 1836, faithless electors moved the vice-presidential decision to the US Senate, though this did not affect the outcome.

== Background ==
The electors themselves are named on the presidential ballots of only eight states.

In the indicated states, laws exist which either impose a fine or imprisonment on an elector who fails to vote according to the state-specified rules, force the elector to vote for the candidate they pledged to vote for, or disqualify the elector and provide a replacement.

In the unique system of presidential elections of the United States, the president is not determined directly by the popular vote of the national electorate, but indirectly through the mechanism of the Electoral College determined by cumulative wins of the popular votes of state electorates. In this system of representative democracy, a presidential candidate is deemed to have won a presidential race if that candidate wins a simple majority of the electoral college vote.

Electors are selected on a state-by-state basis: in 48 states all electors are pledged to the winner of the statewide popular vote; in Maine and Nebraska the winner of each congressional district receives one elector and the statewide winner receives two. The electors, once selected, are free under federal law to vote for a candidate other than the one for whom they were pledged. However, at the time of the election, thirty-one states and the District of Columbia had laws requiring their electors to vote for their pledged candidate, and courts had issued conflicting opinions regarding the constitutionality of those laws. The Supremacy Clause established by the Constitution of the United States provides that state courts are bound by federal law and the Constitution in the event that state law were to contradict them.

Only four times in American history (1876, 1888, 2000, and 2016) has a presidential candidate lost the popular vote but achieved the Electoral College majority, thereby assuming the presidency; in the last three such cases, no candidate polled an absolute majority of the popular vote.

In the event that no one receives a majority of the Electoral College vote, the selection of the president is made by the House of Representatives under certain constitutional guidelines. In 1824 the candidate with the highest popular vote (Andrew Jackson) also had the most electoral votes but, crucially, did not have a majority in the Electoral College. Despite John Quincy Adams having lost the popular vote and having received fewer electoral votes than Andrew Jackson, the House of Representatives chose Adams to become President.

== Number of intended faithless electors ==
In the 2016 election cycle, the threshold of 270 electoral votes to win the presidency and vice presidency outright could have been thwarted by garnering a minimum of at least 12 percent of all Republican electors to become faithless, that is, 37 of 306 Republican electors. However, garnering the requisite number of faithless electors was thought to be extremely unlikely, as electors tend to be dignitaries with long histories in their respective party, and have historically voted for their pledged candidate over 99% of the time.

On November 16, 2016, journalist Bill Lichtenstein published an article in the Huffington Post, detailing the plans by presidential elector Micheal Baca to seek to derail Trump's ascent to the presidency by convincing Democratic and Republican presidential electors to vote for a more moderate candidate on December 19, 2016, when the Electoral College voted. Lichtenstein's article soon went viral, and on December 5, 2016, several members of the electoral college, seven from the Democratic Party and one from the Republican Party, publicly stated their intention to vote for a candidate other than the pledged nominees at the Electoral College vote on December 19, 2016.

Texas Republican elector Christopher Suprun publicly pledged to not cast his vote for Donald Trump as allowed by Texas state law. Suprun indicated that he had also been in confidential contact with several Republican electors who planned to vote faithlessly, stating that they would be "discussing names specifically and see who meets the [fitness for president] test that we could all get behind." By December 5, 2016, two Republican electoral college members who publicly stated their intention to not vote for Trump had resigned. Texas Republican elector Art Sisneros willingly resigned in November rather than vote for Trump. Georgia Republican elector Baoky Vu resigned in August in the face of reaction to his public statement that he would not vote for Trump. Both Sisneros and Vu served in states that lacked any laws preventing electors from faithlessness.

Although it is difficult to ascertain how many more electors, especially Republican electors, considered becoming faithless and voting for a Republican other than Trump, it was reported that at least an additional 20 Republican electors had already accepted free-of-charge anonymous legal counsel and support provided for Republican faithless electors to assist them in voting against Trump.

The Republican National Committee mounted an expansive whip operation to ensure that all those electors selected to vote for the Republican nominee indeed did so. On December 14, multiple Republican members of the electoral college stated under condition of anonymity that they were being coerced with "threats of political reprisal", adding "that the Donald Trump campaign is putting pressure on Republican electors to vote for him based on ... future political outcomes based on whether they vote for Donald Trump or not."

== Public outreach to electors ==
On December 14, the Unite For America campaign released a video published on YouTube and other media addressed directly to Republican electors urging that each of them individually, plus 36 of their colleagues (at least 37 Republican electors in total), vote for a Republican other than Donald Trump for president. The video featured numerous public figures, including Debra Messing, Martin Sheen, and Bob Odenkirk, urging Republican electors to prevent a Trump presidency, expressing several times the message: "I'm not asking you to vote for Hillary Clinton". In electing an alternative Republican, the featured speakers ask the elector to become an "American hero" by using the elector's constitutional "authority" to give "service and patriotism to the American people" through a vote of "conscience".

Daniel Brezenoff's anti-Trump Change.org petition became the largest in that organization's history with nearly five million signatures, and on December 14, full-page ads funded by Brezenoff's related GoFundMe campaign ran in The Washington Post, The Philadelphia Inquirer, the Austin American-Statesman, The Salt Lake Tribune, and the Tampa Bay Times. Full-page ads ran the next day, December 15, in The Atlanta Journal-Constitution and the Wisconsin State Journal.

On December 11, Democratic US Representative Jim Himes of Connecticut wrote on Twitter that Trump is "completely unhinged" and "the Electoral College must do what it was designed for." Himes said he made the plea to the Electoral College because Trump refused to say that the Russians hacked Democrats during the election.

== Legal counsel and advocacy ==
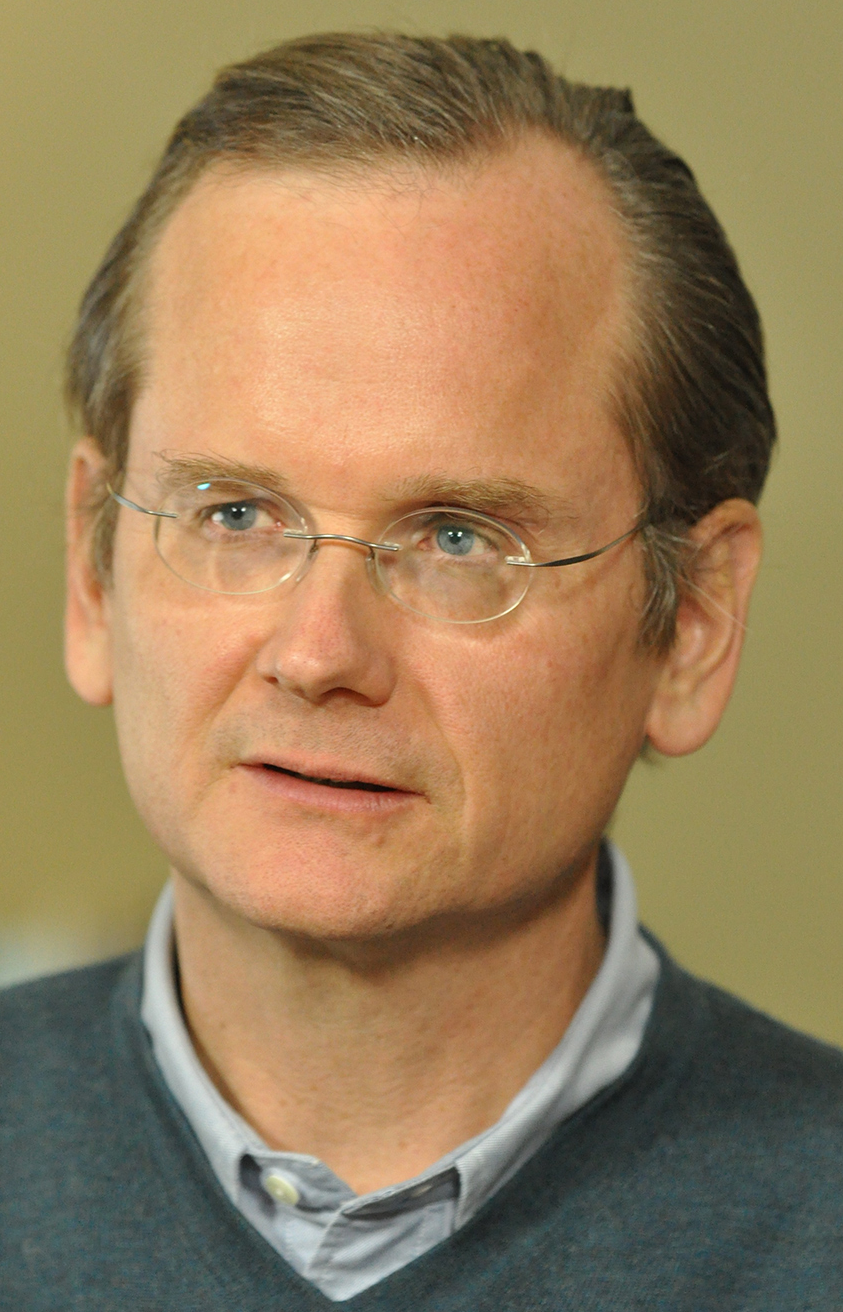
Lawrence Lessig

On December 6, 2016, the Hamilton Electors' website was established to advocate the election of an alternative Republican as the next president of the United States. Lawrence Lessig, a prominent Harvard University law professor (and former candidate for the Democratic presidential nomination himself), announced that he was "teaming with a California-based law firm to offer legal support for any members of the Electoral College seeking to oppose President-elect Donald Trump." Lessig said the counsel and support (namely Laurence Tribe, who has argued before the Supreme Court 36 times) would be provided anonymously. Litigation is a component of Lessig's Equal Citizens movement.

Lessig and Boston attorney R. J. Lyman created a nonprofit organization called Electors Trust to provide potential faithless electors with pro bono legal assistance.

== Litigation prior to the vote ==
In states with laws against faithlessness, depending on the particular state voting faithlessly despite the laws may incur anything from no prescribed punishment, to simple removal and replacement of the intended faithless elector, to fines and the potential imprisonment of the elector. Democratic electors filed lawsuits in Colorado, Washington, and California, but federal judges declined to issue injunctions blocking these laws, and there was insufficient time to appeal to the Supreme Court before the electoral college vote. However, in Baca v. Hickenlooper a three-judge panel of the United States Court of Appeals for the Tenth Circuit declared in a footnote that any attempt to remove electors "after voting has begun" would be "unlikely in light of the text of the Twelfth Amendment."

While at the time of the election the constitutionality of faithless electors had not yet been addressed by the Supreme Court, in Ray v. Blair, 343 U.S. 214 (1952) the court had ruled in favor of state laws requiring electors to pledge to vote for the winning candidate in order to be certified as electors, as well as removing electors who refuse to pledge. Nevertheless, the court had also written:

However, even if such promises of candidates for the electoral college are legally unenforceable because violative of an assumed constitutional freedom of the elector under the Constitution, Art. II, § 1, to vote as he may choose [emphasis added] in the electoral college, it would not follow that the requirement of a pledge in the primary is unconstitutional.

In his dissent, Justice Robert H. Jackson, joined by Justice William O. Douglas, wrote:

No one faithful to our history can deny that the plan originally contemplated what is implicit in its text – that electors would be free agents, to exercise an independent and nonpartisan judgment as to the men best qualified for the Nation's highest offices.

== Recorded faithless electors ==
=== Validated ===
State	Party	Pledged to	Presidential vote	Vice presidential vote	Name of Elector	References
Hawaii		Clinton/Kaine	Bernie Sanders (I-VT)	Elizabeth Warren (D-MA)	David Mulinix	
Texas		Trump/Pence	John Kasich (R-OH)	Carly Fiorina (R-VA)	Christopher Suprun	
Texas		Trump/Pence	Ron Paul (R-TX)	Mike Pence (R-IN)	Bill Greene	
Washington		Clinton/Kaine	Colin Powell (R-VA) (Note: Powell had several homes, including one in NYC (still) and also one in DC, but was officially a VA resident per WikiLeaks emails, and per his 'verified' social media account.)	Maria Cantwell (D-WA)	Levi Guerra	
Washington		Clinton/Kaine	Colin Powell (R-VA)	Susan Collins (R-ME)	Esther John	
Washington		Clinton/Kaine	Colin Powell (R-VA)	Elizabeth Warren (D-MA)	Peter Bret Chiafalo	
Washington		Clinton/Kaine	Faith Spotted Eagle (D-SD)	Winona LaDuke (G-MN)	Robert Satiacum Jr.	

=== Invalidated ===
State	Party	Pledged to	Presidential vote	Vice presidential vote	Name of Elector	Outcome	References
Maine		Clinton/Kaine	Bernie Sanders (I-VT)	Tim Kaine (D-VA)	David Bright	Changed vote to Clinton	
Minnesota		Clinton/Kaine	Bernie Sanders (I-VT)	Tulsi Gabbard (D-HI)	Muhammad Abdurrahman	Replaced by alternate elector	
Colorado		Clinton/Kaine	John Kasich (R-OH)	barred from voting	Micheal Baca	Replaced by alternate elector	

=== Recipients of votes ===
President

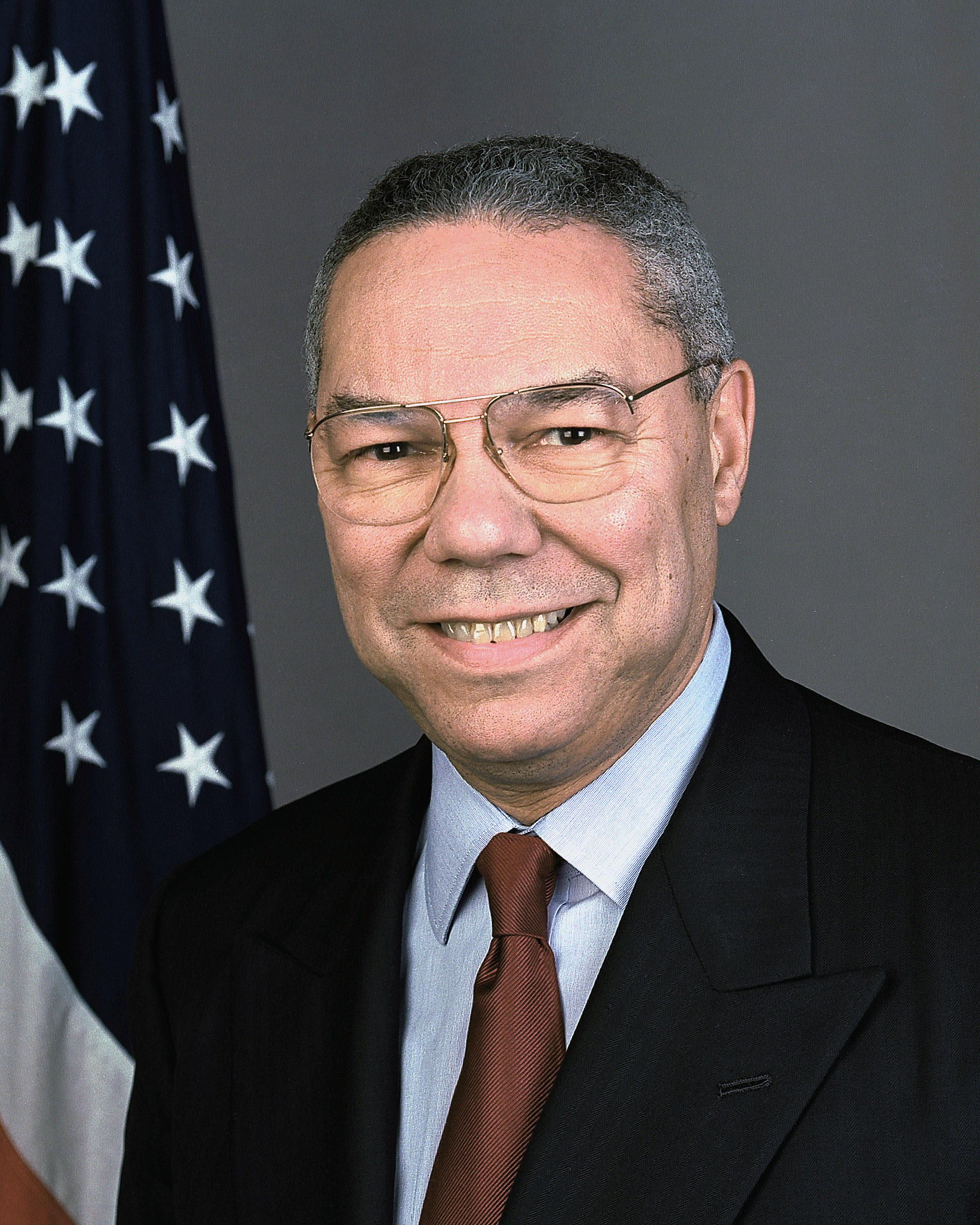
Former Secretary of State Colin Powell, 3 votes

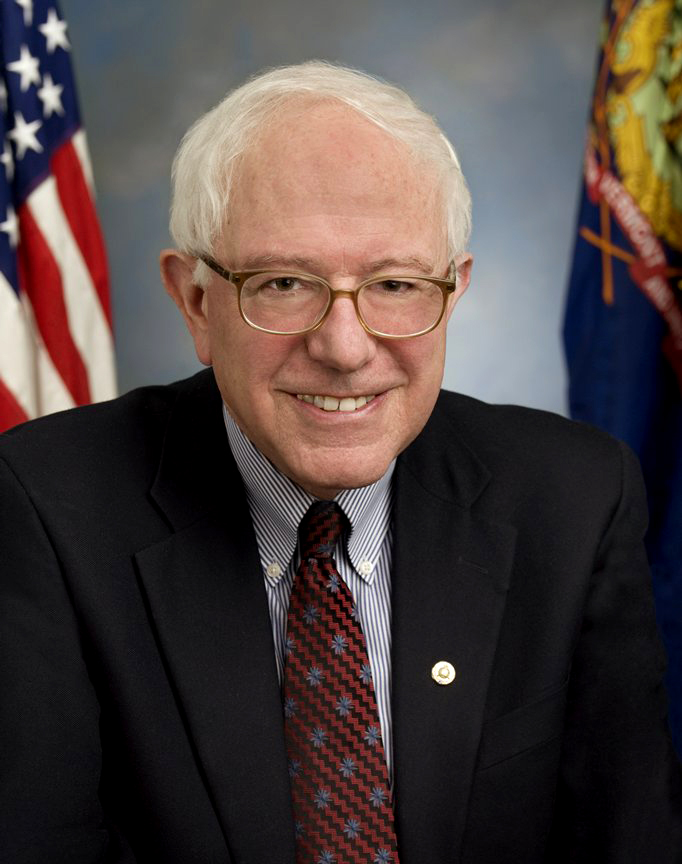
Senator Bernie Sanders, 1 vote (plus 2 invalidated)

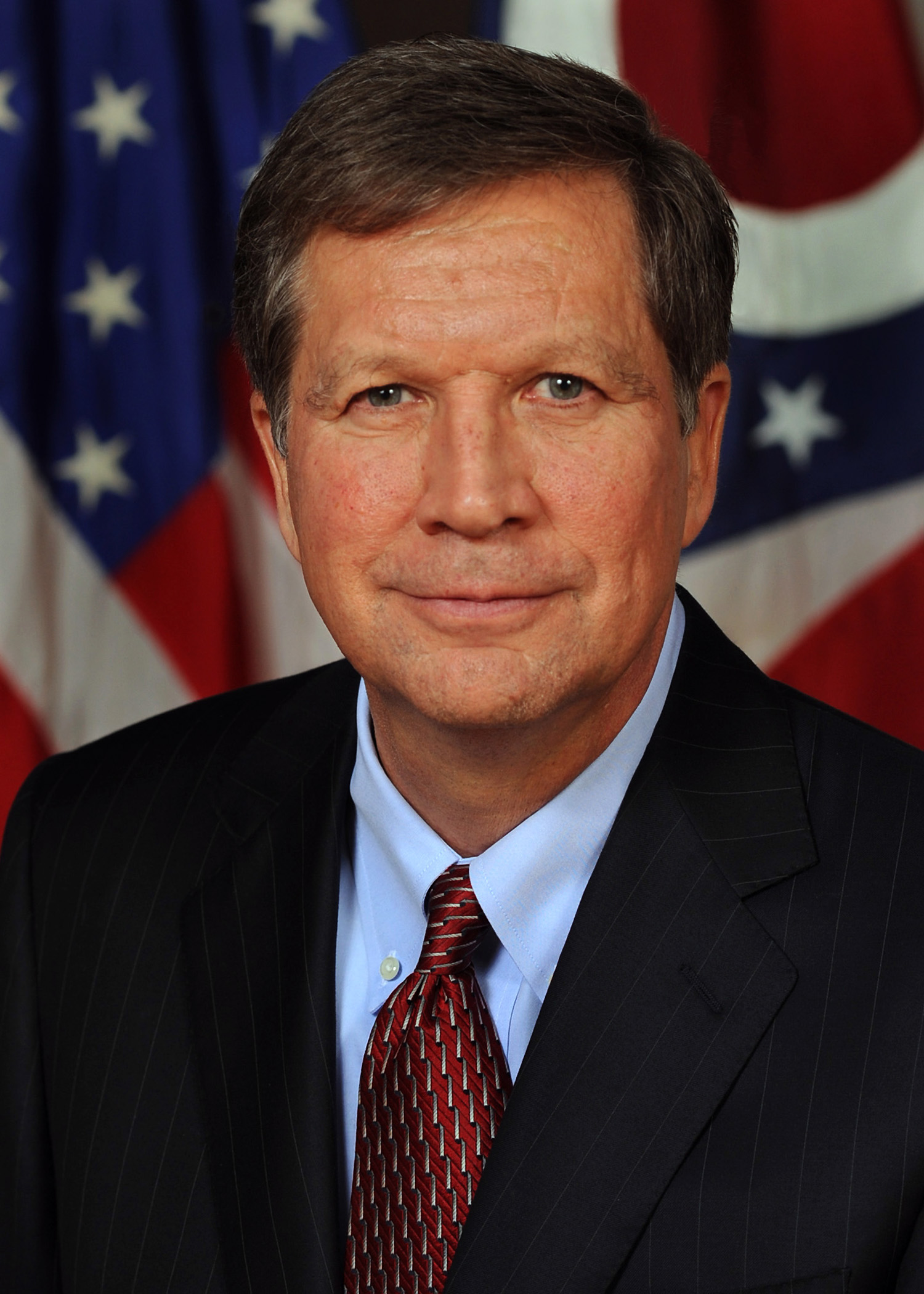
Governor John Kasich, 1 vote (plus 1 invalidated)

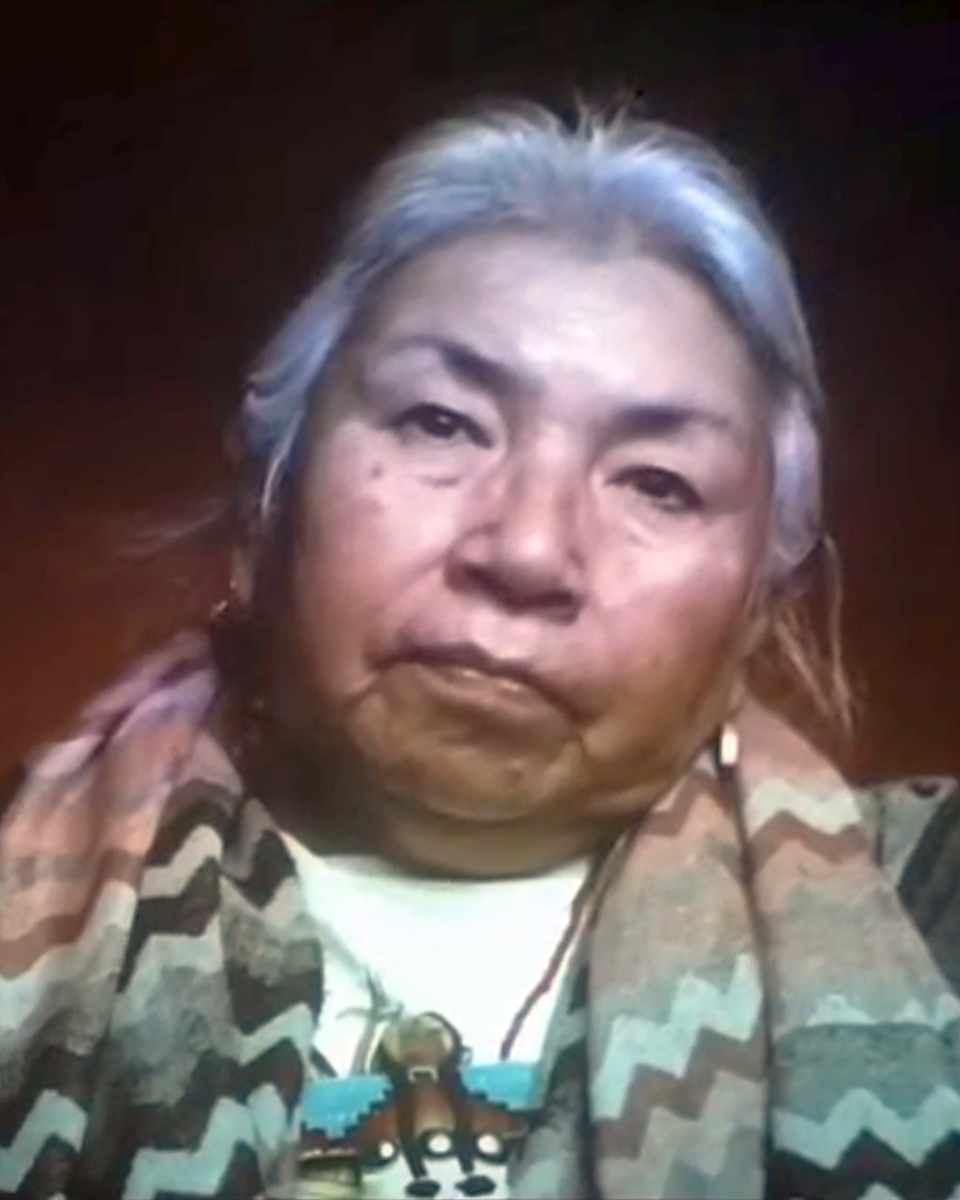
Activist Faith Spotted Eagle, 1 vote

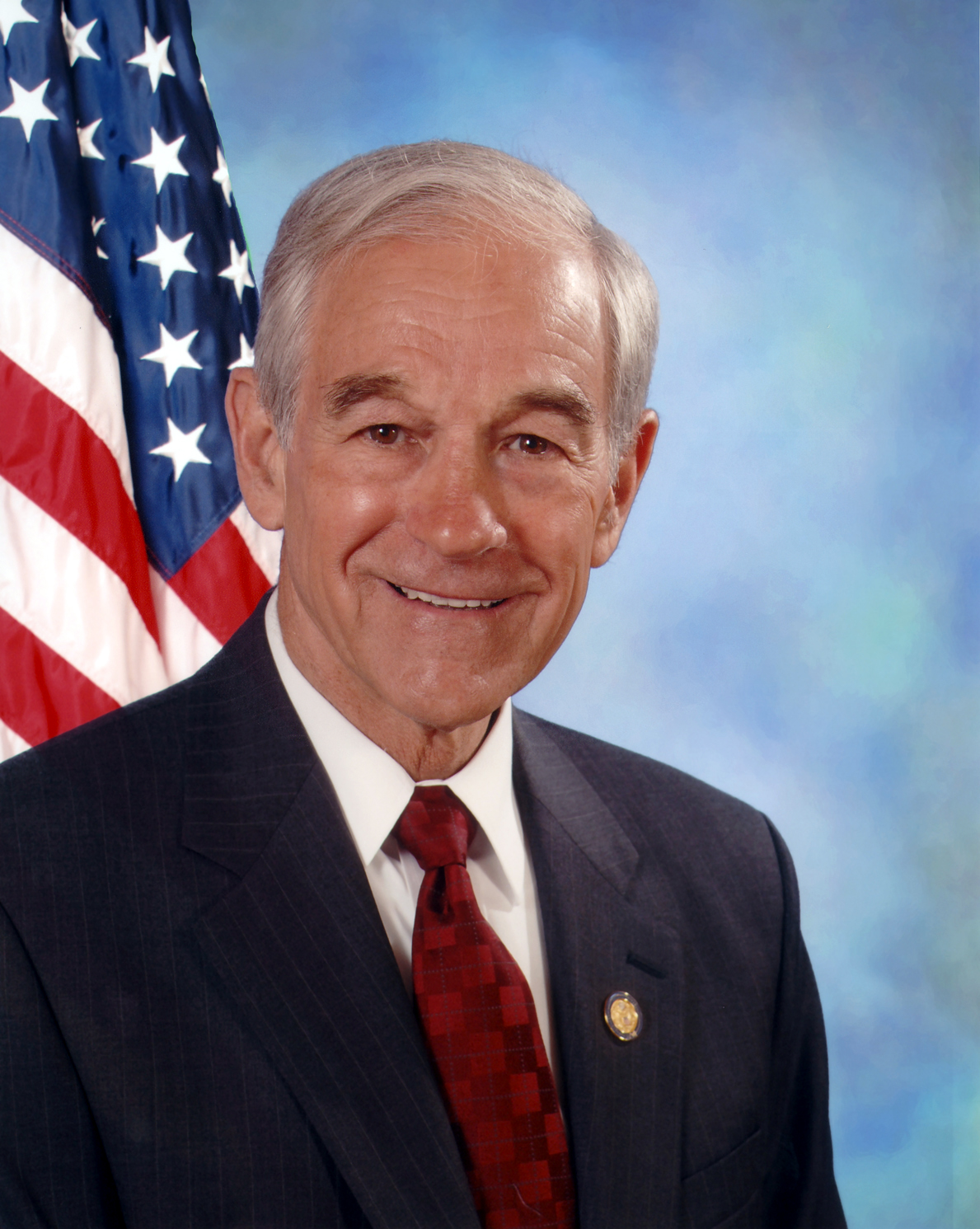
Former representative Ron Paul, 1 vote

Vice President

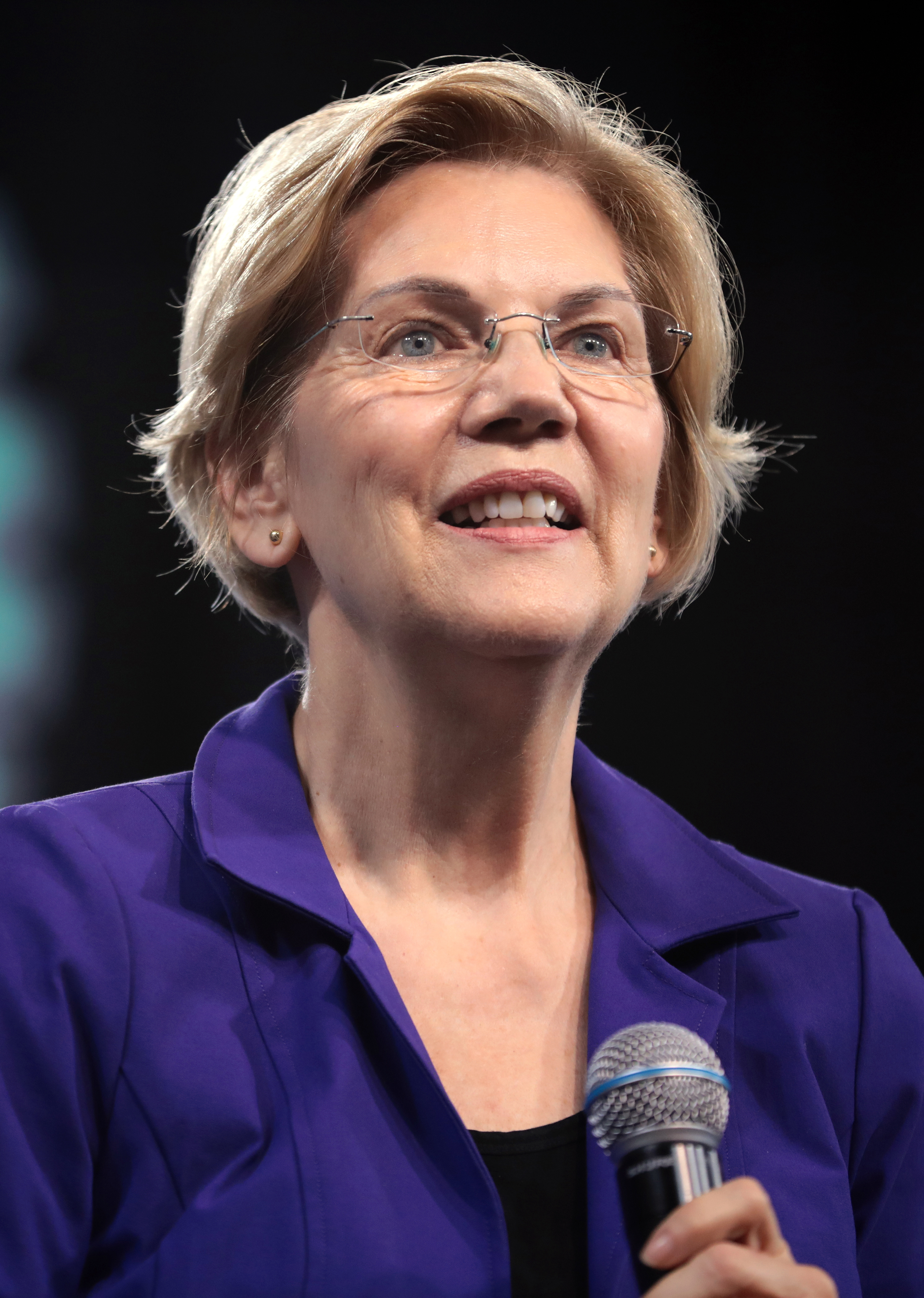
Senator Elizabeth Warren, 2 votes

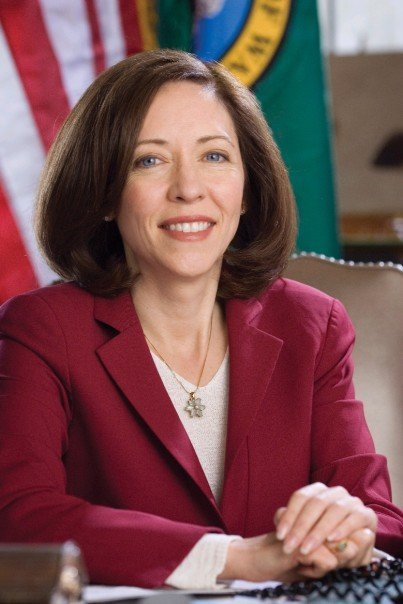
Senator Maria Cantwell, 1 vote

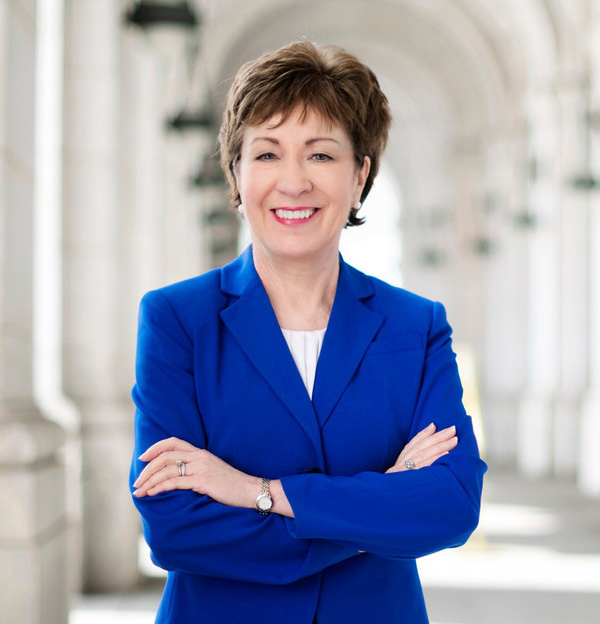
Senator Susan Collins, 1 vote

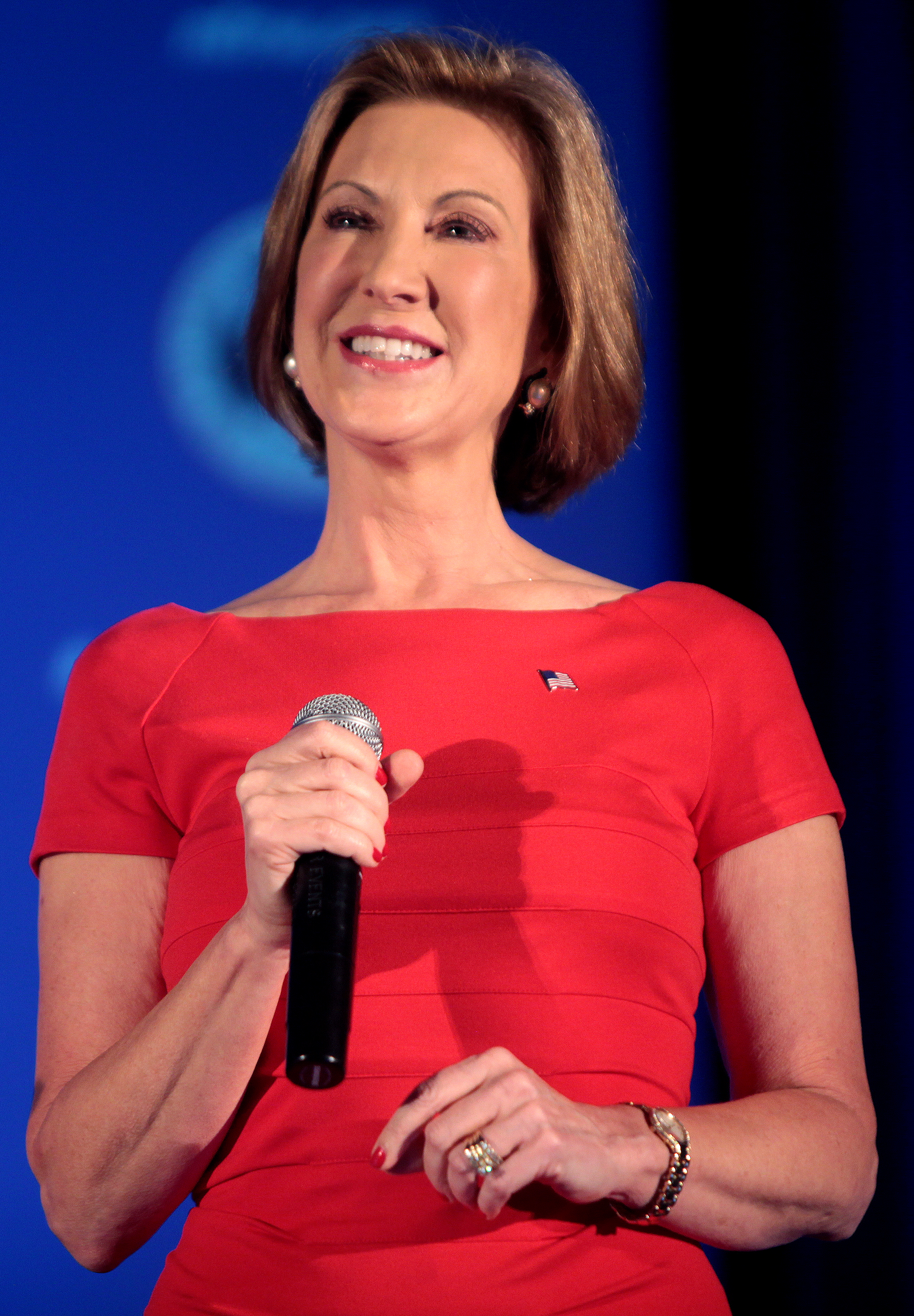
Business executive Carly Fiorina, 1 vote

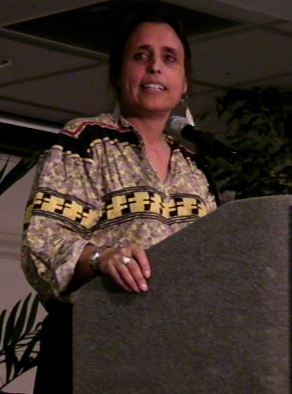
Economist Winona LaDuke, 1 vote

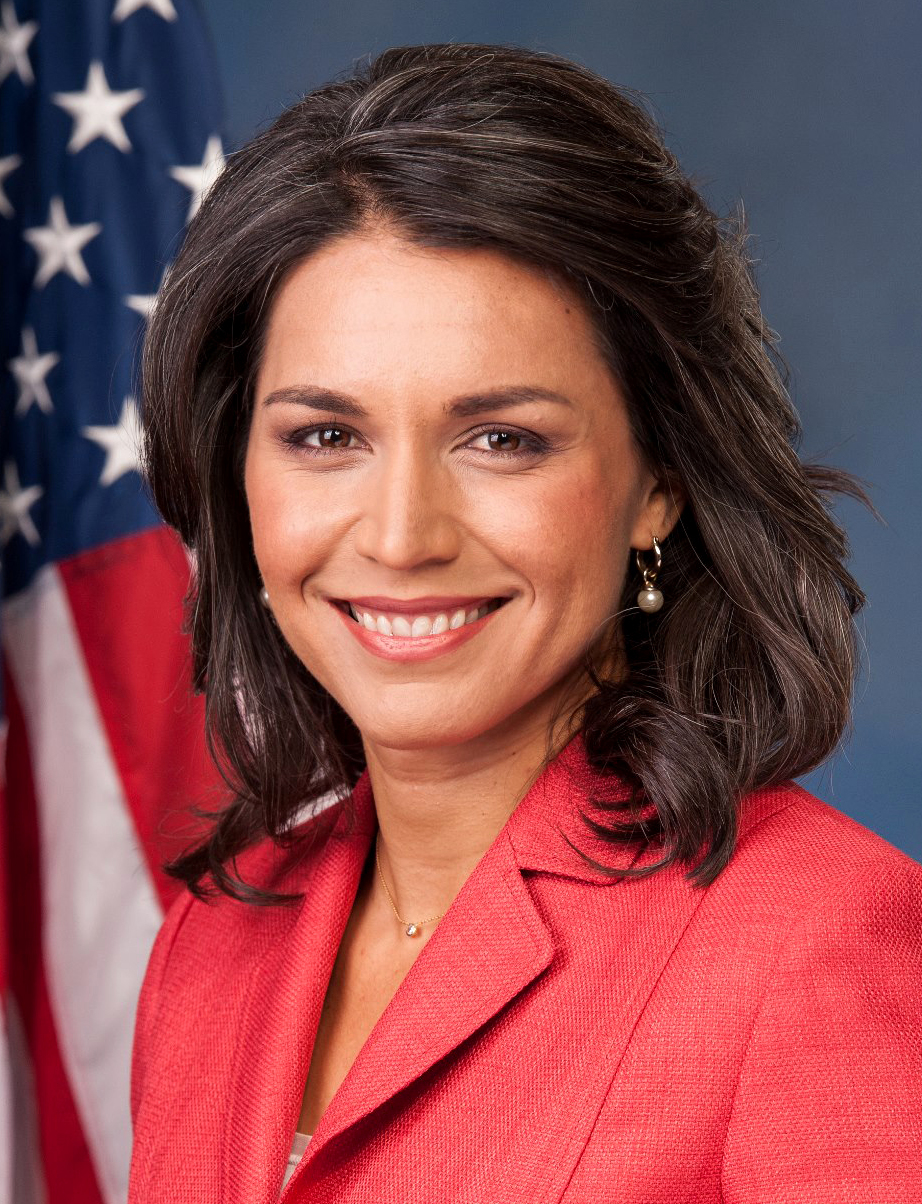
Representative Tulsi Gabbard (1 invalidated vote)

== Legal challenges ==
The four faithless electors from Washington were each fined $1,000 for breaking their pledge. Three of the electors appealed the fines, which were upheld by the Washington Supreme Court in May 2019 by an 8–1 vote. On October 7, 2019, the electors unsuccessfully appealed their case, Chiafalo v. Washington, to the U.S. Supreme Court.

In Colorado, three of the electors filed suit in the United States District Court for the District of Colorado. The case, Baca v. Colorado Department of State, was dismissed by Judge Wiley Young Daniel on April 10, 2018. The electors filed an appeal with the 10th Circuit and oral arguments were held on January 24, 2019. On August 20, 2019, a three-judge panel ruled 2–1 in favor of the electors. On October 16, 2019, Colorado appealed the 10th Circuit's decision to the Supreme Court.

The Supreme Court granted certiorari in both the Washington and Colorado cases in January 2020; while initially consolidated, Justice Sotomayor's recusal in the Colorado case due to a prior relationship with one of the respondents kept the cases separate. Oral arguments in both cases had been scheduled for April, but were subsequently postponed due to the COVID-19 pandemic. It was then announced that oral arguments would be held via phone, which occurred on May 13, 2020. On July 6, 2020, the Supreme Court ruled unanimously that states may require an elector to vote for the candidate to whom they had pledged, and a fine imposed for an elector for breaching a pledge is not unlawful.

== See also ==
- Election Assistance Commission
- List of 2016 United States presidential electors, the people chosen at state-by-state political party conventions during the Republican and Democratic primaries to be electors in this election cycle
- Unpledged elector
