= Faith Spotted Eagle =

American activist and politician (born 1948)

- Tȟuŋkáŋ Inážiŋ Win
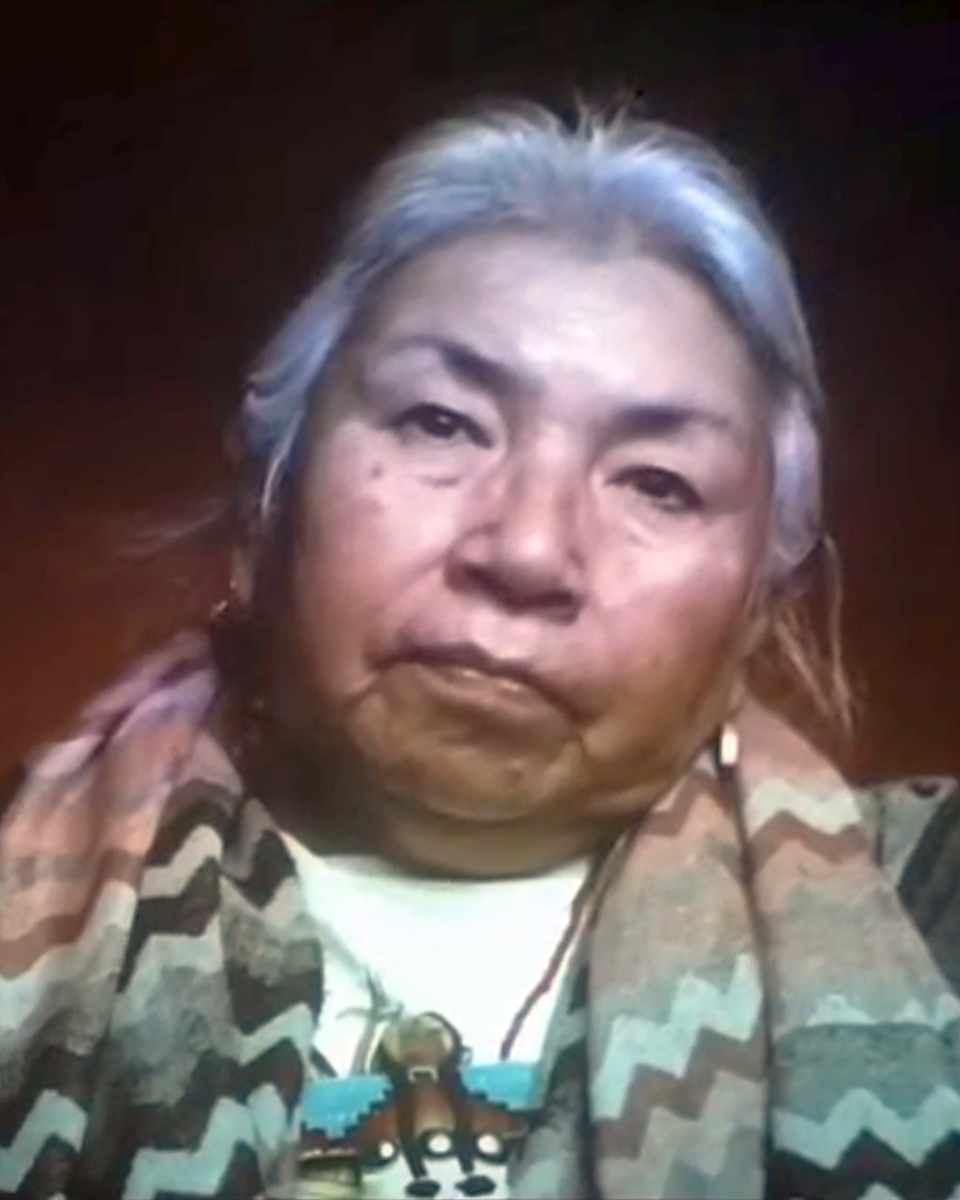
- Spotted Eagle in 2018
- Born: 1948 (age 77–78); Lake Andes, South Dakota, U.S.
- Education: University of South Dakota
- Occupations: PTSD counselor, educator
- Known for: Dakota Access Pipeline protests; Brave Heart Society; Receiving an electoral vote in 2016 U.S. presidential election
- Political party: Democratic

Faith Spotted Eagle (Dakota: Tunkan Inajin Win or Tȟuŋkáŋ Inážiŋ Win, pronounced [tˣũkã́ ináʒĩ win], lit. 'Standing Stone'; born 1948) is an American activist and politician. She is a citizen of the Yankton Sioux Tribe who attempted to block development of the Keystone XL pipeline and the Dakota Access Pipeline.

In the 2016 presidential election, she became the first Native American to receive an electoral vote for President of the United States as well as one of the first two women of 3 total to receive one. Spotted Eagle's single vote came from Robert Satiacum Jr., a faithless elector in Washington, who cast it for her instead of Hillary Clinton.

== Background ==
Spotted Eagle is from the village of White Swan, now beneath 140 feet (43 m) of water at the bottom of Lake Francis Case — an artificial reservoir created by the Fort Randall Dam. She still lives in the area at nearby Lake Andes, South Dakota. She attended the American University in Washington, D.C., and Black Hills State College in Spearfish, South Dakota, and holds an MA in Educational Psychology and Counseling from the University of South Dakota. Her time as a student included an internship for then-senator George McGovern.

Spotted Eagle is a native speaker of Lakota, and learned English in school.

== Career ==
=== Activism ===
Spotted Eagle has been a private consultant in PTSD counseling for veterans, a school counselor and principal, and a Dakota language teacher at Sinte Gleska College. She is a founding member of the Brave Heart Society, an organization for teaching girls about traditional culture, chair of the Ihanktonwan Treaty Committee, and the manager of Brave Heart Lodge in Lake Andes which seeks to preserve Dakota cultural beliefs for the future. Spotted Eagle served as a delegate of the Treaty Committee NGO at the United Nations.

Spotted Eagle criticized President Donald Trump following his use of the term "Pocahontas" to refer to Senator Elizabeth Warren. She referred to the incident as an "emotional assault" that "carries as much weight as a physical assault," and said, "He can phrase it and twist it and distort it any way he wants, the fact remains: That name does not belong in his mouth."

=== Politics ===
==== 2006 state house candidacy ====
Spotted Eagle ran for a seat in the South Dakota House of Representatives in 2006 for the 21st district, which comprises Brule, Buffalo, Charles Mix, Jones, and Lyman counties. She placed 3rd in the Democratic Party primary out of three candidates, receiving 735 votes overall. Spotted Eagle won the most votes of any candidate in majority-Native American Buffalo County. She had been convinced to run for the seat, but did not actively campaign.

==== 2016 presidential election ====
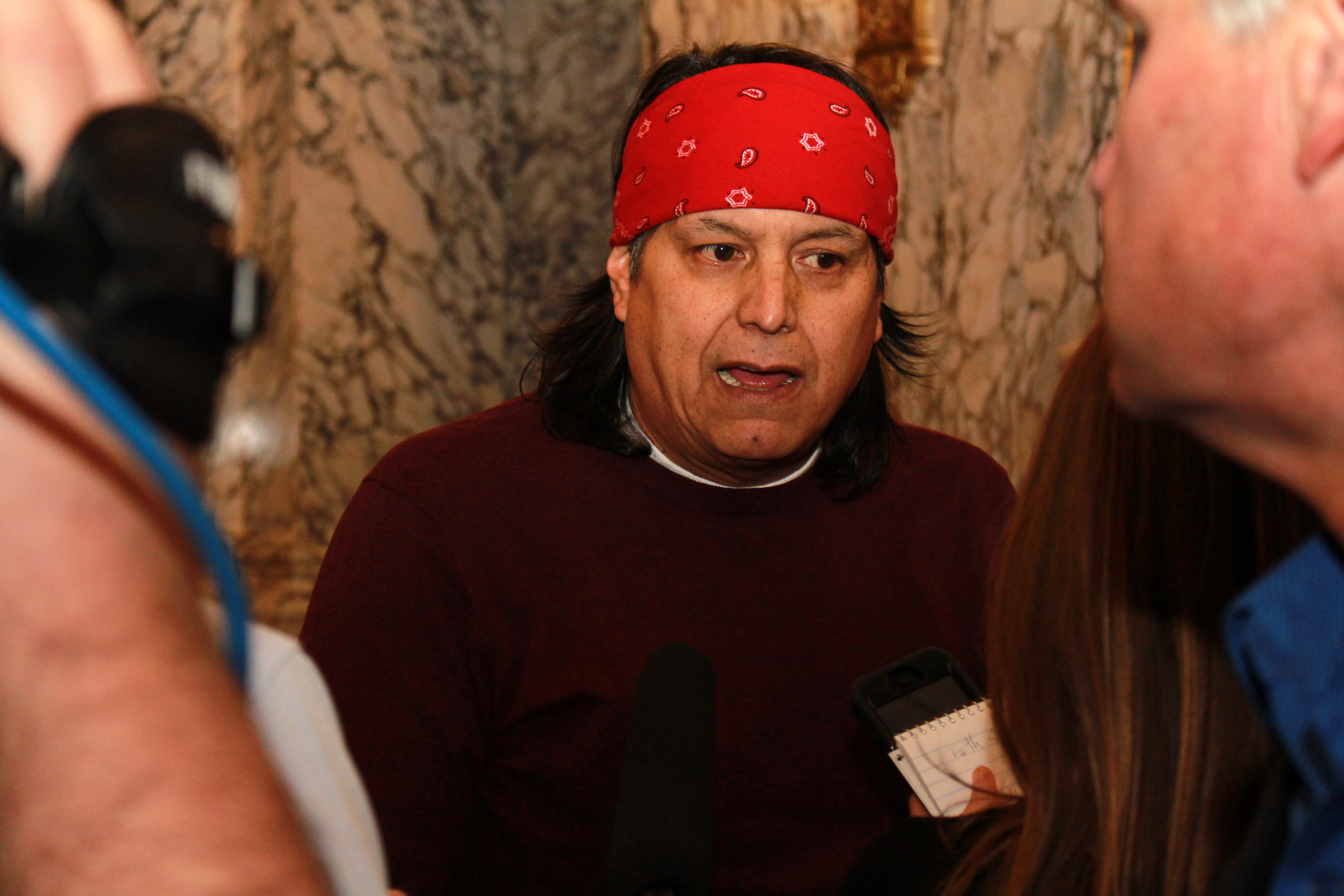
Robert Satiacum Jr., a faithless elector in the 2016 U.S. presidential elections, cast his vote for Spotted Eagle

Spotted Eagle received one electoral vote for President of the United States from Robert Satiacum Jr. of Washington, a faithless elector during the 2016 presidential election. Satiacum explained that Clinton had failed Native Americans, especially regarding the pipeline issue.

Spotted Eagle said that she was surprised when she learned that she received this vote. She said she hoped the vote would increase awareness of the environmental dangers of the Keystone XL project, and that she was now considering running for state office.

Spotted Eagle is the first Native American to receive an Electoral College vote for President (though not the first to receive an electoral vote overall, as Charles Curtis received a majority of electoral votes to become Vice President in 1928), and she and Hillary Clinton are the first two women to receive an electoral vote for president.

==== 2018 state house candidacy ====
Spotted Eagle ran for one of two seats in District 21 of the South Dakota House of Representatives in 2018, aiming to succeed retiring Democrat Julie Bartling. She lost the Democratic primary, coming in third for total votes behind Brian Jorgensen and Anna Kerner Andersson. Brian Jorgensen withdrew before the general election however, placing Spotted Eagle back in the race. Ultimately, she did not garner enough votes to win the general election, coming behind Anna Kerner Anderson who in turn came behind the two Republicans who won both seats, Lee Qualm (incumbent) and Caleb Finck.

== See also ==
- Faithless electors in the United States presidential election, 2016
- List of people who received an electoral vote in the United States Electoral College
- Charles Curtis, the first person with significant Native American ancestry to receive an electoral college majority vote, for vice-president in 1928
- Tonie Nathan, the first woman to receive an electoral college vote, for vice president in 1972
- List of Native American politicians
- Native American women in politics
