= Robert Satiacum Jr. =

Puyallup politician (born 1960)

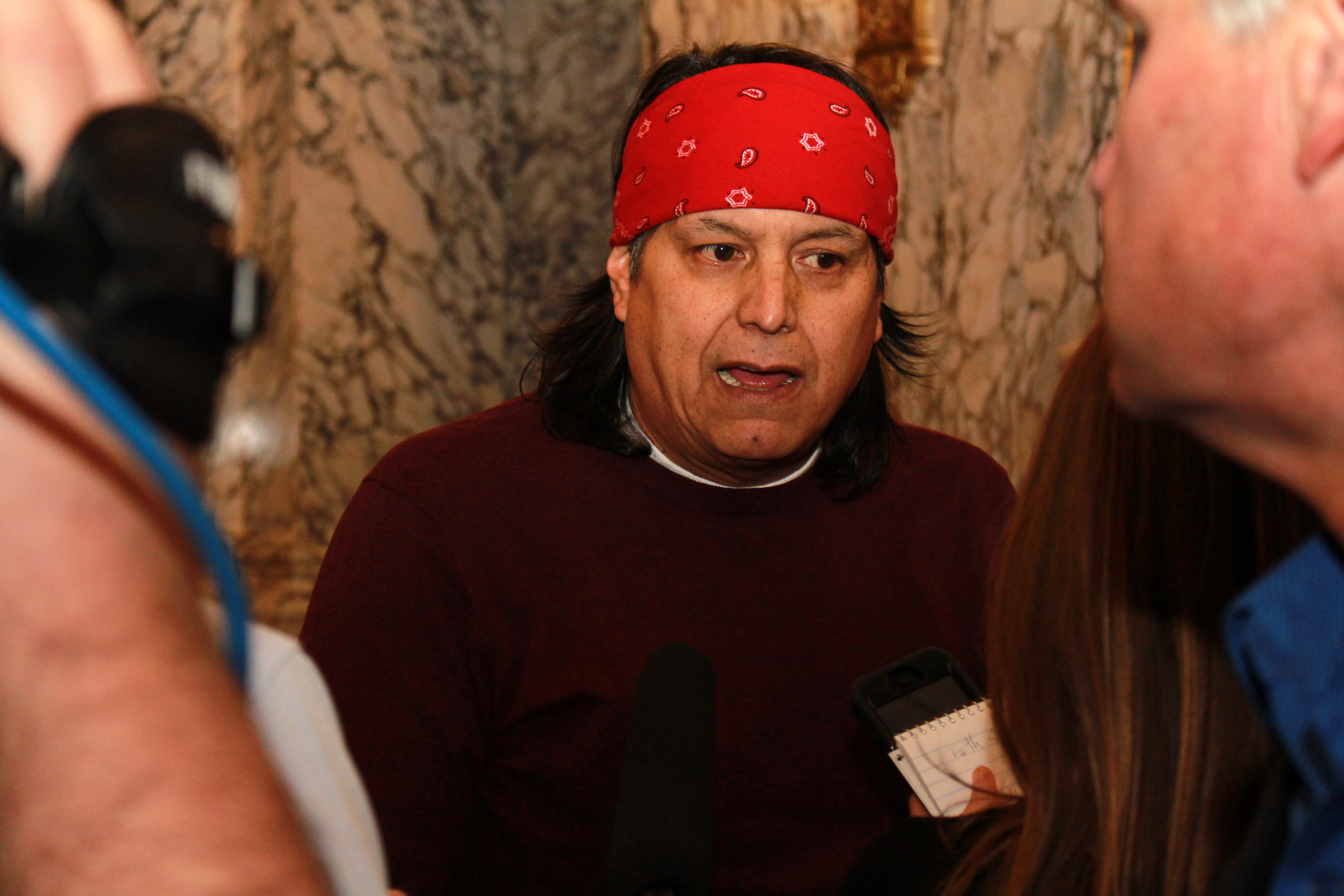
- Satiacum in 2016
- Born: 5 February 1960 (age 66); Washington, U.S.
- Occupations: Political and environmental activist, radio host for KLAY
- Political party: Democratic
- Spouse: Elizabeth Satiacum
- Children: 4
- Father: Robert Satiacum

Robert Satiacum Jr. (born February 5, 1960) is an American political and environmental activist and member of the Puyallup tribe of Washington. He served as a Democratic presidential elector for the 2016 election. By voting for Faith Spotted Eagle, the first Native American to receive an electoral vote for president, Satiacum did not vote as pledged, and as such is regarded as a faithless elector.

== Biography ==
Satiacum is the son of the late Robert Satiacum Sr., an advocate for Native fishing rights whose arrest resulted in the landmark Boldt Decision. His wife, Elizabeth, served as an elector for Barack Obama in the 2008 election. In 2010, he served as an officer for the Democratic Party for Pierce County. Satiacum was a delegate for Bernie Sanders to the 2016 Democratic National Convention, and was nominated as an elector by Patsy Whitefoot. Prior to the election, he publicly stated he might not vote for presidential nominee Hillary Clinton and vice presidential nominee Tim Kaine. He argued that Clinton's stance on the environment was no different than Donald Trump's.

=== Electoral College ===
When the Electoral College voted on December 19, 2016, Satiacum voted for Faith Spotted Eagle, a Native American activist from South Dakota for president, and Winona LaDuke, an environmentalist and former Green Party vice presidential candidate from Minnesota, for vice president. Spotted Eagle and LaDuke became only the second and third Native Americans to receive electoral votes in American history, after Charles Curtis who was elected vice president in 1928, and made Spotted Eagle the first Native American to receive an electoral vote for president and LaDuke the first Native American woman to receive an electoral college vote for vice president. After the Electoral College vote, Satiacum explained that he was prepared to vote for Sanders, but at the last moment was inspired to vote for Spotted Eagle when a fellow elector and Native American, Dan Carpita, started playing a ceremonial song on the flute.

Satiacum was one of four 2016 faithless electors from Washington, and one of seven total. He was fined $1,000 after the election.

== Personal life and other work ==
Robert and Elizabeth Satiacum have six children and ten grandchildren. He hosts a radio show, Tribal Talk, which airs on KLAY in the Tacoma, Washington area, and founded the cultural activist coalition Full Circle. He also co-starred in the 2007 film Rain in the Mountains, in which he portrayed a tribal police officer. Starting in 2010, he has led an effort to officially re-name Mount Rainier to Ti’Swaq, the name of a band of Indian people who lived high on the mountain’s slopes.

Satiacum advocates for the sweat lodge ritual and mentors others on the red road, a moral path based on traditional native values.

Satiacum, along with other Native American activists, advocated for tribal fishing rights by holding "fish-ins" on the Puyallup River.
