= United States Electoral College =

Electors of the U.S. president and vice president

The number of electoral votes, out of 538, allocated to each state and Washington, D.C. for presidential elections held in 2024 and to be held in 2028 based on the 2020 census. Every jurisdiction is entitled to at least 3.

In the 2024 presidential election, held using 2020 census data, Kamala Harris received 226 (●) and Donald Trump received 312 (●) of the total 538 electoral votes. In Maine (upper-right) and Nebraska (center), the small circled numbers indicate where an EC seat was filled in a way contrary to the plurality of votes state-wide. These are the only 2 states to use a district method for some of their allocated electors instead of a complete winner-takes-all party block voting.

In the United States, the Electoral College is the group of presidential electors that is formed every four years for the purpose of voting for the president and vice president in the presidential election. This process is described in Article Two of the Constitution. The number of electors from each state is equal to that state's congressional delegation which is the number of senators (two) plus the number of Representatives for that state. Each state appoints electors using legal procedures determined by its legislature. Federal office holders, including senators and representatives, cannot be electors. Federal agencies provide step-by-step descriptions of how electors are appointed, meet in December, and how Congress counts the electoral votes. Additionally, the Twenty-third Amendment granted the federal District of Columbia three electors (bringing the total number from 535 to 538). A simple majority of electoral votes (270 or more) is required to elect the president and vice president. If no candidate achieves a majority, a contingent election is held by the House of Representatives, to elect the president, and by the Senate, to elect the vice president.

The states and the District of Columbia hold a statewide or district-wide popular vote on Election Day in November to choose electors based upon how they have pledged to vote for president and vice president, with some state laws prohibiting faithless electors. All states except Maine and Nebraska use party block voting, or general ticket method, to choose their electors, meaning all their electors go to one winning ticket. Maine and Nebraska choose one elector per congressional district and two electors for the ticket with the highest statewide vote. The electors meet and vote in December, and the inaugurations of the president and vice president take place in January. Political science research finds that winner-take-all allocation tends to concentrate presidential campaign visits and advertising in a small number of competitive "swing" states, while noncompetitive states receive comparatively less attention.

The merit of the electoral college system has been a matter of ongoing debate in the United States since its inception at the Constitutional Convention in 1787, becoming more controversial by the latter years of the 19th century, up to the present day. Over 1,000 constitutional amendments have been introduced to change the Electoral College. An amendment that would have abolished the system was approved by the House in 1969, but failed to move past the Senate.

Supporters argue that it requires presidential candidates to have broad appeal across the country to win, while critics argue that it is not representative of the popular will of the nation. (Note: The constitutional convention of 1787 had rejected presidential selection by direct popular vote. That being the case, election mechanics based on an electoral college were devised to render selection of the president independent of both state legislatures and the national legislature.) Public opinion polling has found that about two-thirds of Americans support replacing the Electoral College with a national popular vote.

== Procedure ==
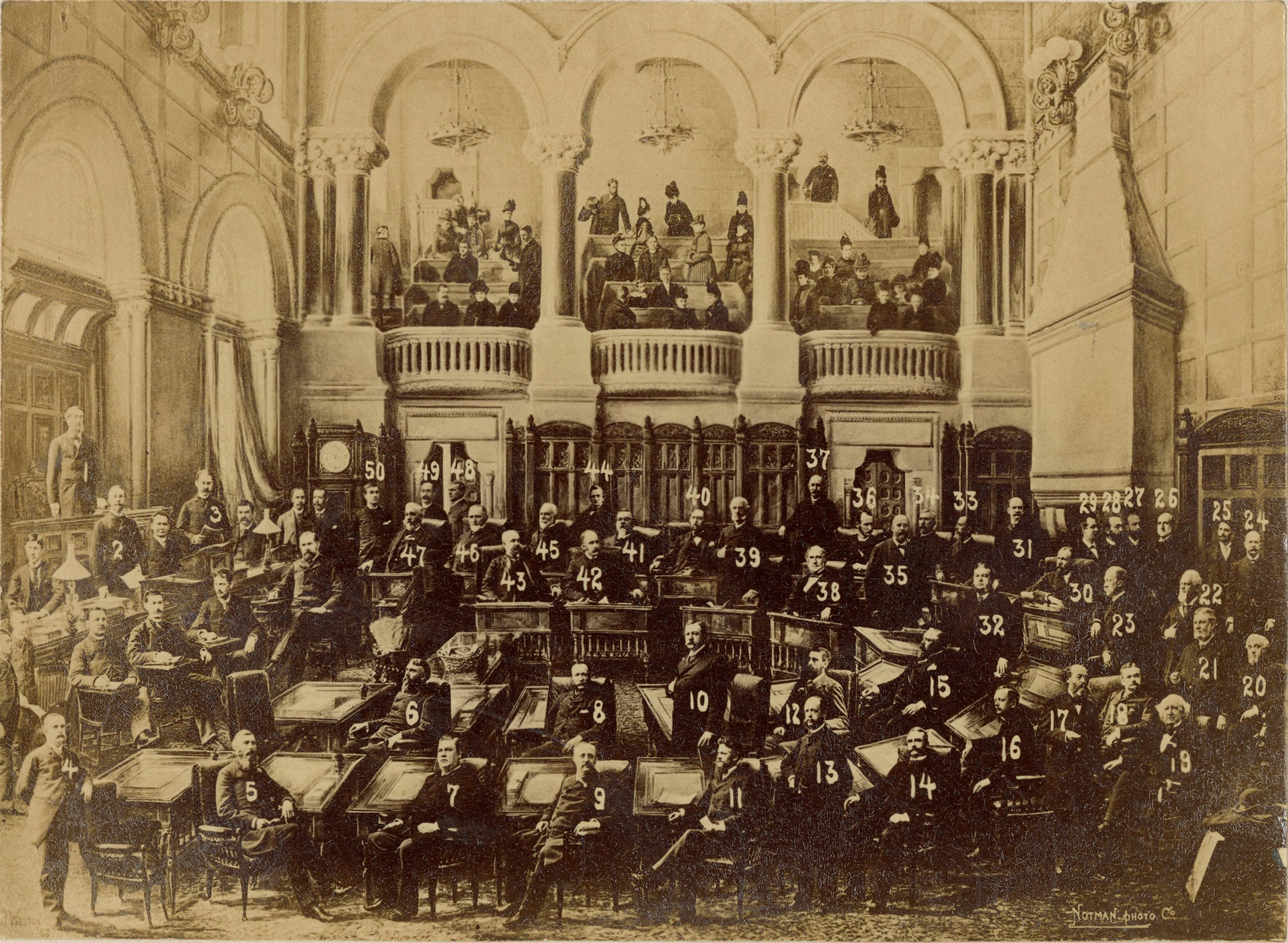
The New York electoral college delegation voting for Benjamin Harrison for president. In the 1888 election, Harrison became one of the five presidents elected without winning the popular vote.

Article II, Section 1, Clause 2 of the United States Constitution directs each state to appoint a number of electors equal to that state's congressional delegation (the number of members of the House of Representatives plus two senators). The same clause empowers each state legislature to determine the manner by which that state's electors are chosen but prohibits federal office holders from being named electors. Following the national presidential election day on Tuesday after the first Monday in November, each state, and the federal district, selects its electors according to its laws. After a popular election, the states identify and record their appointed electors in a Certificate of Ascertainment, and those appointed electors then meet in their respective jurisdictions and produce a Certificate of Vote for their candidate; both certificates are then sent to Congress to be opened and counted.

In 48 of the 50 states, state laws mandate that the winner of the plurality of the statewide popular vote receives all of that state's electoral votes. In Maine and Nebraska, two electoral votes are assigned in this manner, while the remaining electoral votes are allocated based on the plurality of votes in each of their congressional districts. The federal district, Washington, D.C., allocates its 3 electoral votes to the winner of its single district election. States generally require electors to pledge to vote for that state's winning ticket; to prevent electors from becoming faithless electors, most states have adopted various laws to enforce the electors' pledge.

The electors of each state meet in their respective state capital on the first Tuesday after the second Wednesday of December, between December 14 and 20, to cast their votes. The results are sent to and counted by the Congress, where they are tabulated in the first week of January before a joint meeting of the Senate and the House of Representatives, presided over by the current vice president, as president of the Senate.

If a majority of votes are not cast for a candidate, a contingent election takes place: the House holds a presidential election session, where one vote is cast by each of the fifty states. The Senate is responsible for electing the vice president, with each senator having one vote. The elected president and vice president are inaugurated on January 20.

Since 1964, there have been 538 electors. States select 535 of the electors; this number matches the aggregate total of their congressional delegations. The additional three electors come from the Twenty-third Amendment, ratified in 1961, providing that the district established pursuant to Article I, Section 8, Clause 17 as the seat of the federal government (namely, Washington, D.C.) is entitled to the same number of electors as the least populous state. In practice, that results in Washington, D.C. being entitled to three electors.

== Background ==
The Electoral College was officially selected as the means of electing the president towards the end of the Constitutional Convention, due to pressure from slave states wanting to increase their voting power, since they could count slaves as 3/5 of a person when allocating electors, and by small states who increased their power given the minimum of three electors per state. The compromise was reached after other proposals, including a direct election for president (as proposed by Hamilton among others), failed to get traction among slave states. Steven Levitsky and Daniel Ziblatt describe it as "not a product of constitutional theory or farsighted design. Rather, it was adopted by default, after all other alternatives had been rejected."

In 1787, the Constitutional Convention used the Virginia Plan as the basis for discussions, as the Virginia proposal was the first. The Virginia Plan called for Congress to elect the president. Delegates from a majority of states agreed to this mode of election. After being debated, delegates came to oppose nomination by Congress for the reason that it could violate the separation of powers. James Wilson then made a motion for electors for the purpose of choosing the president.

Later in the convention, a committee formed to work out various details. They included the mode of election of the president, including final recommendations for the electors, a group of people apportioned among the states in the same numbers as their representatives in Congress (the formula for which had been resolved in lengthy debates resulting in the Connecticut Compromise and Three-Fifths Compromise), but chosen by each state "in such manner as its Legislature may direct". Committee member Gouverneur Morris explained the reasons for the change. Among others, there were fears of "intrigue" if the president were chosen by a small group of men who met together regularly, as well as concerns for the independence of the president if he were elected by Congress.

Once the Electoral College had been decided on, several delegates (Mason, Butler, Morris, Wilson, and Madison) openly recognized its ability to protect the election process from cabal, corruption, intrigue, and faction. Some delegates, including James Wilson and James Madison, preferred popular election of the executive. Madison acknowledged that while a popular vote would be ideal, it would be difficult to get consensus on the proposal given the prevalence of slavery in the South:

There was one difficulty, however of a serious nature attending an immediate choice by the people. The right of suffrage was much more diffusive in the Northern than the Southern States; and the latter could have no influence in the election on the score of Negroes. The substitution of electors obviated this difficulty and seemed on the whole to be liable to the fewest objections.

The convention approved the committee's Electoral College proposal, with minor modifications, on September 4, 1787. Delegates from states with smaller populations or limited land area, such as Connecticut, New Jersey, and Maryland, generally favored the Electoral College with some consideration for states. At the compromise providing for a runoff among the top five candidates, the small states supposed that the House of Representatives, with each state delegation casting one vote, would decide most elections.

In The Federalist Papers, James Madison explained his views on the selection of the president and the Constitution. In Federalist No. 39, Madison argued that the Constitution was designed to be a mixture of state-based and population-based government. Congress would have two houses: the state-based Senate and the population-based House of Representatives. Meanwhile, the president would be elected by a mixture of the two modes.

Alexander Hamilton in Federalist No. 68, published on March 12, 1788, laid out what he believed were the key advantages to the Electoral College. The electors come directly from the people and them alone, for that purpose only, and for that time only. This avoided a party-run legislature or a permanent body that could be influenced by foreign interests before each election. Hamilton explained that the election was to take place among all the states, so no corruption in any state could taint "the great body of the people" in their selection. The choice was to be made by a majority of the Electoral College, as majority rule is critical to the principles of republican government. Hamilton argued that electors meeting in the state capitals were able to have information unavailable to the general public, in a time before telecommunications. Hamilton also argued that since no federal officeholder could be an elector, none of the electors would be beholden to any presidential candidate.

Another consideration was that the decision would be made without "tumult and disorder", as it would be a broad-based one made simultaneously in various locales where the decision makers could deliberate reasonably, not in one place where decision makers could be threatened or intimidated. If the Electoral College did not achieve a decisive majority, then the House of Representatives was to choose the president from among the top five candidates, ensuring selection of a presiding officer administering the laws would have both ability and good character. Hamilton was also concerned about somebody unqualified but with a talent for "low intrigue, and the little arts of popularity" attaining high office.

In the Federalist No. 10, James Madison argued against "an interested and overbearing majority" and the "mischiefs of faction" in an electoral system. He defined a faction as "a number of citizens whether amounting to a majority or minority of the whole, who are united and actuated by some common impulse of passion, or of interest, adverse to the rights of other citizens, or to the permanent and aggregate interests of the community." A republican government (i.e., representative democracy, as opposed to direct democracy) combined with the principles of federalism (with distribution of voter rights and separation of government powers), would countervail against factions. Madison further postulated in the Federalist No. 10 that the greater the population and expanse of the Republic, the more difficulty factions would face in organizing due to such issues as sectionalism.

Although the United States Constitution refers to "Electors" and "electors", neither the phrase "Electoral College" nor any other name is used to describe the electors collectively. It was not until the early 19th century that the name "Electoral College" came into general usage as the collective designation for the electors selected to cast votes for president and vice president. The phrase was first written into federal law in 1845, and today the term appears in 3 U.S.C. § 4, in the section heading and in the text as "college of electors".

== History ==
Electoral college wins have ranged from 100% (George Washington) to barely more than 50%. Elections in the 21st century have been closer, on average, than most prior elections (colored and bolded names).

=== Original plan ===
Article II, Section 1, Clause 3 of the Constitution provided the original plan by which the electors voted for president. Under the original plan, each elector cast two votes for president; electors did not vote for vice president. Whoever received a majority of votes from the electors would become president; with the person receiving the second most votes becoming vice president.

According to Stanley Chang, the original plan of the Electoral College was based upon several assumptions and anticipations of the Framers of the Constitution:

1. Choice of the president should reflect the "sense of the people" at a particular time, not the dictates of a faction in a "pre-established body" such as Congress or the State legislatures, and independent of the influence of "foreign powers".
2. The choice would be made decisively with a "full and fair expression of the public will" but also maintaining "as little opportunity as possible to tumult and disorder".
3. Individual electors would be elected by citizens on a district-by-district basis. Voting for president would include the widest electorate allowed in each state.
4. Each presidential elector would exercise independent judgment when voting, deliberating with the most complete information available in a system that over time, tended to bring about a good administration of the laws passed by Congress.
5. Candidates would not pair together on the same ticket with assumed placements toward each office of president and vice president.

Election expert, William C. Kimberling, reflected on the original intent as follows:

"The function of the College of Electors in choosing the president can be likened to that in the Roman Catholic Church of the College of Cardinals selecting the Pope. The original idea was for the most knowledgeable and informed individuals from each State to select the president based solely on merit and without regard to State of origin or political party."

According to Supreme Court justice Robert H. Jackson, in a dissenting opinion, the original intention of the framers was that the electors would not feel bound to support any particular candidate, but would vote their conscience, free of external pressure.

"No one faithful to our history can deny that the plan originally contemplated, what is implicit in its text, that electors would be free agents, to exercise an independent and nonpartisan judgment as to the men best qualified for the Nation's highest offices."

In support for his view, Justice Jackson cited Federalist No. 68:

'It was desirable that the sense of the people should operate in the choice of the person to whom so important a trust was to be confided. This end will be answered by committing the right of making it, not to any pre-established body, but to men chosen by the people for the special purpose, and at the particular conjuncture... It was equally desirable, that the immediate election should be made by men most capable of analyzing the qualities adapted to the station, and acting under circumstances favorable to deliberation, and to a judicious combination of all the reasons and inducements which were proper to govern their choice. A small number of persons, selected by their fellow citizens from the general mass, will be most likely to possess the information and discernment requisite to such complicated investigations.'

Philip J. VanFossen of Purdue University explains that the original purpose of the electors was not to reflect the will of the citizens, but rather to "serve as a check on a public who might be easily misled."

Randall Calvert, the Eagleton Professor of Public Affairs and Political Science at Washington University in St. Louis, stated, "At the framing the more important consideration was that electors, expected to be more knowledgeable and responsible, would actually do the choosing."

Constitutional expert Michael Signer explained that the electoral college was designed "to provide a mechanism where intelligent, thoughtful and statesmanlike leaders could deliberate on the winner of the popular vote and, if necessary, choose another candidate who would not put Constitutional values and practices at risk." Robert Schlesinger, writing for U.S. News and World Report, similarly stated, "The original conception of the Electoral College, in other words, was a body of men who could serve as a check on the uninformed mass electorate."

==== Breakdown and revision ====
In spite of Hamilton's assertion that electors were to be chosen by mass election, initially, state legislatures chose the electors in most of the states. States progressively changed to selection by popular election. In 1824, there were six states in which electors were still legislatively appointed. By 1832, only South Carolina had not transitioned. Since 1864 (with the sole exception of newly admitted Colorado in 1876 for logistical reasons), electors in every state have been chosen based on a popular election held on Election Day. The popular election for electors means the president and vice president are in effect chosen through indirect election by the citizens.

==== The emergence of parties and campaigns ====
The framers of the Constitution did not anticipate political parties. Indeed George Washington's Farewell Address in 1796 included an urgent appeal to avert such parties. Neither did the framers anticipate candidates "running" for president. Within just a few years of the ratification of the Constitution, however, both phenomena became permanent features of the political landscape of the United States.

The emergence of political parties and nationally coordinated election campaigns soon complicated matters in the elections of 1796 and 1800. In 1796, Federalist Party candidate John Adams won the presidential election. Finishing in second place was Democratic-Republican Party candidate Thomas Jefferson, the Federalists' opponent, who became the vice president. This resulted in the president and vice president being of different political parties.

In 1800, the Democratic-Republican Party again nominated Jefferson for president and also again nominated Aaron Burr for vice president. After the electors voted, Jefferson and Burr were tied with one another with 73 electoral votes each. Since ballots did not distinguish between votes for president and votes for vice president, every ballot cast for Burr technically counted as a vote for him to become president, despite Jefferson clearly being his party's first choice. Lacking a clear winner by constitutional standards, the election had to be decided by the House of Representatives pursuant to the Constitution's contingency election provision.

Having already lost the presidential contest, Federalist Party representatives in the lame duck House session seized upon the opportunity to embarrass their opposition by attempting to elect Burr over Jefferson. The House deadlocked for 35 ballots as neither candidate received the necessary majority vote of the state delegations in the House (The votes of nine states were needed for a conclusive election.). On the 36th ballot, Delaware's lone Representative, James A. Bayard Sr., made it known that he intended to break the impasse for fear that failure to do so could endanger the future of the Union. Bayard and other Federalists from South Carolina, Maryland, and Vermont abstained, breaking the deadlock and giving Jefferson a majority.

Responding to the problems from those elections, Congress proposed on December 9, 1803, and three-fourths of the states ratified by June 15, 1804, the Twelfth Amendment. Starting with the 1804 election, the amendment requires electors to cast separate ballots for president and vice president, replacing the system outlined in Article II, Section 1, Clause 3.

=== Evolution from unpledged to pledged electors ===
Some Founding Fathers hoped that each elector would be elected by the citizens of a district and that elector was to be free to analyze and deliberate regarding who is best suited to be president.

In Federalist No. 68 Alexander Hamilton described the Founding Fathers' view of how electors would be chosen:

A small number of persons, selected by their fellow-citizens from the general mass, will be most likely to possess the information and discernment requisite to such complicated [tasks]... They [the framers of the constitution] have not made the appointment of the President to depend on any preexisting bodies of men [i.e. Electors pledged to vote one way or another], who might be tampered with beforehand to prostitute their votes [i.e., to be told how to vote]; but they have referred it in the first instance to an immediate act of the people of America, to be exerted in the choice of persons [Electors to the Electoral College] for the temporary and sole purpose of making the appointment. And they have EXCLUDED from eligibility to this trust, all those who from situation might be suspected of too great devotion to the President in office [in other words, no one can be an Elector who is prejudiced toward the president]... Thus without corrupting the body of the people, the immediate agents in the election will at least enter upon the task free from any sinister bias [Electors must not come to the Electoral College with bias]. Their transient existence, and their detached [unbiased] situation, already taken notice of, afford a satisfactory prospect of their continuing so, to the conclusion of it."

However, when electors were pledged to vote for a specific candidate, the slate of electors chosen by the state were no longer free agents, independent thinkers, or deliberative representatives. They became, as Justice Robert H. Jackson wrote, "voluntary party lackeys and intellectual non-entities." According to Hamilton, writing in 1788, the selection of the president should be "made by men most capable of analyzing the qualities adapted to the station [of president]."

Hamilton stated that the electors were to analyze the list of potential presidents and select the best one. He also used the term "deliberate." In a 2020 opinion of the U.S. Supreme Court, the court additionally cited John Jay's view that the electors' choices would reflect "discretion and discernment." Reflecting on this original intention, a U.S. Senate report in 1826 critiqued the evolution of the system:

It was the intention of the Constitution that these electors should be an independent body of men, chosen by the people from among themselves, on account of their superior discernment, virtue, and information; and that this select body should be left to make the election according to their own will, without the slightest control from the body of the people. That this intention has failed of its object in every election, is a fact of such universal notoriety that no one can dispute it. Electors, therefore, have not answered the design of their institution. They are not the independent body and superior characters which they were intended to be. They are not left to the exercise of their own judgment: on the contrary, they give their vote, or bind themselves to give it, according to the will of their constituents. They have degenerated into mere agents, in a case which requires no agency, and where the agent must be useless...

In 1833, Supreme Court Justice Joseph Story detailed how badly from the framers' intention the Electoral Process had been "subverted":

In no respect have the views of the framers of the constitution been so completely frustrated as relates to the independence of the electors in the electoral colleges. It is notorious, that the electors are now chosen wholly with reference to particular candidates, and are silently pledged to vote for them. Nay, upon some occasions the electors publicly pledge themselves to vote for a particular person; and thus, in effect, the whole foundation of the system, so elaborately constructed, is subverted.

Story observed that if an elector does what the framers of the Constitution expected him to do, he would be considered immoral:

So, that nothing is left to the electors after their choice, but to register votes, which are already pledged; and an exercise of an independent judgment would be treated, as a political usurpation, dishonorable to the individual, and a fraud upon his constituents.

=== Evolution to the general ticket ===
Article II, Section 1, Clause 2 of the Constitution states:

Each State shall appoint, in such Manner as the Legislature thereof may direct, a Number of Electors, equal to the whole Number of Senators and Representatives to which the State may be entitled in the Congress: but no Senator or Representative, or Person holding an Office of Trust or Profit under the United States, shall be appointed an Elector.

According to Hamilton, Madison and others, the original intent was that this would take place district by district. The district plan was last carried out in Michigan in 1892. For example, in Massachusetts in 1820, the rule stated "the people shall vote by ballot, on which shall be designated who is voted for as an Elector for the district." In other words, the name of a candidate for president was not on the ballot. Instead, citizens voted for their local elector.

Some state leaders began to adopt the strategy that the favorite partisan presidential candidate among the people in their state would have a much better chance if all of the electors selected by their state were sure to vote the same way—a "general ticket" of electors pledged to a party candidate. Once one state took that strategy, the others felt compelled to follow suit in order to compete for the strongest influence on the election.

When James Madison and Alexander Hamilton, two of the most important architects of the Electoral College, saw this strategy being taken by some states, they protested strongly. Madison said that when the Constitution was written, all of its authors assumed individual electors would be elected in their districts, and it was inconceivable that a "general ticket" of electors dictated by a state would supplant the concept. Madison wrote to George Hay:

The district mode was mostly, if not exclusively in view when the Constitution was framed and adopted; & was exchanged for the general ticket [many years later].

Each state government was free to have its own plan for selecting its electors, and the Constitution does not explicitly require states to popularly elect their electors. However, Federalist No. 68, insofar as it reflects the intent of the founders, states that Electors will be "selected by their fellow-citizens from the general mass," and with regard to choosing Electors, "they [the framers] have referred it in the first instance to an immediate act of the people of America." Several methods for selecting electors are described below.

Madison and Hamilton were so upset by the trend to "general tickets" that they advocated a constitutional amendment to prevent anything other than the district plan. Hamilton drafted an amendment to the Constitution mandating the district plan for selecting electors. Hamilton's untimely death in a duel with Aaron Burr in 1804 prevented him from advancing his proposed reforms any further. "[T]he election of Presidential Electors by districts, is an amendment very proper to be brought forward," Madison told George Hay in 1823.

Madison also drafted a constitutional amendment that would ensure the original "district" plan of the framers. Jefferson agreed with Hamilton and Madison saying, "all agree that an election by districts would be the best." Jefferson explained to Madison's correspondent why he was doubtful of the amendment being ratified: "the states are now so numerous that I despair of ever seeing another amendment of the constitution."

=== Evolution of selection plans ===
In 1789, the at-large popular vote, the winner-take-all method, began with Pennsylvania and Maryland. Massachusetts, Virginia and Delaware used a district plan by popular vote, and state legislatures chose in the five other states participating in the election (Connecticut, Georgia, New Hampshire, New Jersey, and South Carolina). New York, North Carolina and Rhode Island did not participate in the election. New York's legislature deadlocked over the method of choosing electors and abstained; North Carolina and Rhode Island had not yet ratified the Constitution.

By 1800, Virginia and Rhode Island voted at large; Kentucky, Maryland, and North Carolina voted popularly by district; and eleven states voted by state legislature. Beginning in 1804 there was a definite trend towards the winner-take-all system for statewide popular vote.

By 1832, only South Carolina legislatively chose its electors, and it abandoned the method after 1860. Maryland was the only state using a district plan, and from 1836 district plans fell out of use until the 20th century, though Michigan used a district plan for 1892 only. States using popular vote by district have included ten states from all regions of the country.

Since 1836, statewide winner-take-all popular voting for electors has been the almost universal practice. Currently, Maine (since 1972) and Nebraska (since 1992) use a district plan, with two at-large electors assigned to support the winner of the statewide popular vote.

=== Correlation between popular vote and electoral college votes ===
In a small percentage of US presidential elections, winners in the electoral college received less of the popular vote than their opponents.

Since the mid-19th century, when all electors have been popularly chosen, the Electoral College has elected the candidate who received the most (though not necessarily a majority) popular votes nationwide, except in four elections: 1876, 1888, 2000, and 2016. A case has also been made that it happened in 1960. In 1824, when there were six states in which electors were legislatively appointed, rather than popularly elected, the true national popular vote is uncertain. The electors in 1824 failed to select a winning candidate, so the matter was decided by the House of Representatives.

=== Three-fifths clause and the role of slavery ===
After the initial estimates agreed to in the original Constitution, Congressional and Electoral College reapportionment was made according to a decennial census to reflect population changes, modified by counting three-fifths of slaves. On this basis after the first census, the Electoral College still gave the free men of slave-owning states (but never slaves) extra power (Electors) based on a count of these disenfranchised people, in the choice of the U.S. president.

At the Constitutional Convention, the college composition, in theory, amounted to 49 votes for northern states (in the process of abolishing slavery) and 42 for slave-holding states (including Delaware). In the event, the first (i.e. 1788) presidential election lacked votes and electors for unratified Rhode Island (3) and North Carolina (7) and for New York (8) which reported too late; the Northern majority was 38 to 35. For the next two decades, the three-fifths clause led to electors of free-soil Northern states numbering 8% and 11% more than Southern states. The latter had, in the compromise, relinquished counting two-fifths of their slaves and, after 1810, were outnumbered by 15.4% to 23.2%.

While House members for Southern states were boosted by an average of 1/3, a free-soil majority in the college maintained over this early republic and Antebellum period. Scholars conclude that the three-fifths clause had low impact on sectional proportions and factional strength, until denying the North a pronounced supermajority, as to the Northern, federal initiative to abolish slavery. The seats that the South gained from such "slave bonus" were quite evenly distributed between the parties. In the First Party System (1795–1823), the Jefferson Republicans gained 1.1 percent more adherents from the slave bonus, while the Federalists lost the same proportion. At the Second Party System (1823–1837) the emerging Jacksonians gained just 0.7% more seats, versus the opposition loss of 1.6%.

The three-fifths slave-count rule is associated with three or four outcomes, 1792–1860:

- The clause, having reduced the South's power, led to John Adams's win in 1796 over Thomas Jefferson.
- In 1800, historian Garry Wills argues, Jefferson's victory over Adams was due to the slave bonus count in the Electoral College as Adams would have won if citizens' votes were used for each state. However, historian Sean Wilentz points out that Jefferson's purported "slave advantage" ignores an offset by electoral manipulation by anti-Jefferson forces in Pennsylvania. Wilentz concludes that it is a myth to say that the Electoral College was a pro-slavery ploy.
- In 1824, the presidential selection was passed to the House of Representatives, and John Quincy Adams was chosen over Andrew Jackson, who won fewer citizens' votes. Then Jackson won in 1828, but would have lost if the college were citizen-only apportionment. Scholars conclude that in the 1828 race, Jackson benefited materially from the Three-fifths clause by providing his margin of victory.

The first "Jeffersonian" and "Jacksonian" victories were of great importance as they ushered in sustained party majorities of several Congresses and presidential party eras.

Besides the Constitution prohibiting Congress from regulating foreign or domestic slave trade before 1808 and a duty on states to return escaped "persons held to service", legal scholar Akhil Reed Amar argues that the college was originally advocated by slaveholders as a bulwark to prop up slavery. In the Congressional apportionment provided in the text of the Constitution with its Three-Fifths Compromise estimate, "Virginia emerged as the big winner [with] more than a quarter of the [votes] needed to win an election in the first round [for Washington's first presidential election in 1788]." Following the 1790 United States census, the most populous state was Virginia, with 39.1% slaves, or 292,315 counted three-fifths, to yield a calculated number of 175,389 for congressional apportionment.

"The "free" state of Pennsylvania had 10% more free persons than Virginia but got 20% fewer electoral votes." Pennsylvania split eight to seven for Jefferson, favoring Jefferson with a majority of 53% in a state with 0.1% slave population. Historian Eric Foner agrees the Constitution's Three-Fifths Compromise gave protection to slavery.

Supporters of the College have provided many counterarguments to the charges that it defended slavery. Abraham Lincoln, the president who helped abolish slavery, won a College majority in 1860 despite winning 39.8% of citizen's votes. This, however, was a clear plurality of a popular vote divided among four main candidates.

Benner notes that Jefferson's first margin of victory would have been wider had the entire slave population been counted on a per capita basis. He also notes that some of the most vociferous critics of a national popular vote at the constitutional convention were delegates from free states, including Gouverneur Morris of Pennsylvania, who declared that such a system would lead to a "great evil of cabal and corruption," and Elbridge Gerry of Massachusetts, who called a national popular vote "radically vicious".

Delegates Oliver Ellsworth and Roger Sherman of Connecticut, a state which had adopted a gradual emancipation law three years earlier, also criticized a national popular vote. Of like view was Charles Cotesworth Pinckney, a member of Adams' Federalist Party, presidential candidate in 1800. He hailed from South Carolina and was a slaveholder. In 1824, Andrew Jackson, a slaveholder from Tennessee, was similarly defeated by John Quincy Adams, a strong critic of slavery.

=== Fourteenth Amendment ===
Section 2 of the Fourteenth Amendment requires a state's representation in the House of Representatives to be reduced if the state denies the right to vote to any male citizen aged 21 or older, unless on the basis of "participation in rebellion, or other crime". The reduction is to be proportionate to such people denied a vote. This amendment refers to "the right to vote at any election for the choice of electors for President and Vice President of the United States" (among other elections). It is the only part of the Constitution currently alluding to electors being selected by popular vote.

On May 8, 1866, during a debate on the Fourteenth Amendment, Thaddeus Stevens, the leader of the Republicans in the House of Representatives, delivered a speech on the amendment's intent. Regarding Section 2, he said:

The second section I consider the most important in the article. It fixes the basis of representation in Congress. If any State shall exclude any of her adult male citizens from the elective franchise, or abridge that right, she shall forfeit her right to representation in the same proportion. The effect of this provision will be either to compel the States to grant universal suffrage or so shear them of their power as to keep them forever in a hopeless minority in the national Government, both legislative and executive.

Federal law (2 U.S.C. § 6) implements Section 2's mandate.

=== Meeting of electors ===
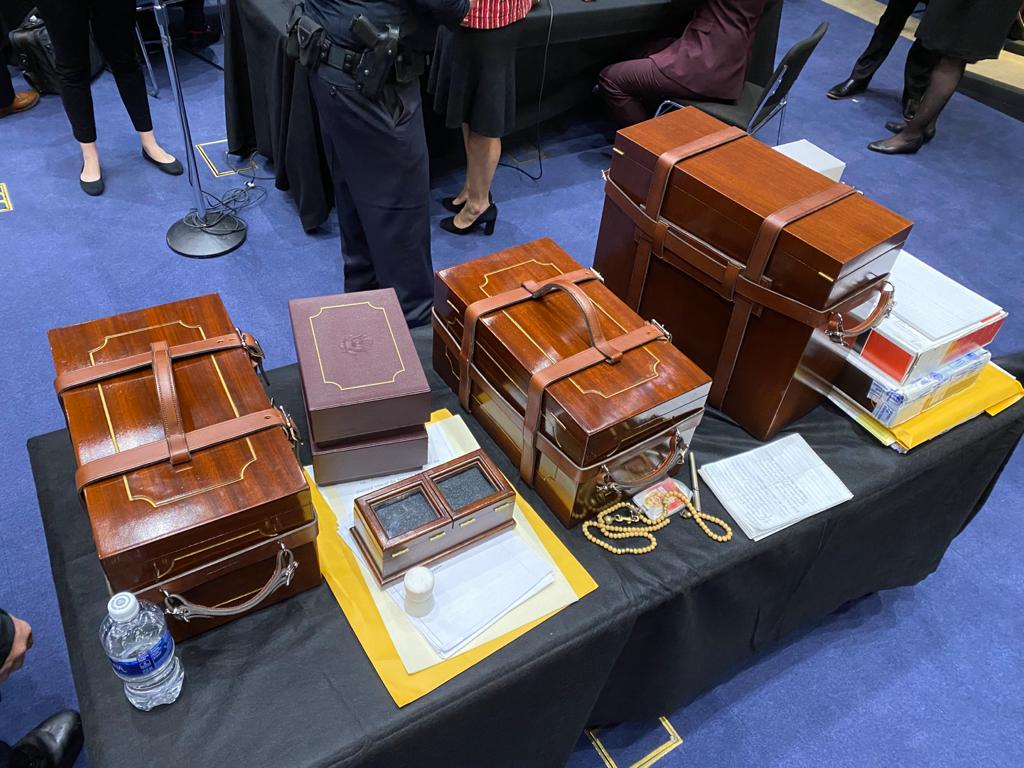
Cases of certificates of the electoral college votes confirming the results of the 2020 US election, after they had been removed from the House Chambers by congressional staff during the January 6 United States Capitol attack

Article II, Section 1, Clause 4 of the Constitution authorizes Congress to fix the day on which the electors shall vote, which must be the same day throughout the United States. And both Article II, Section 1, Clause 3 and the Twelfth Amendment that replaced it specifies that "the President of the Senate shall, in the presence of the Senate and House of Representatives, open all the certificates and the votes shall then be counted."

In 1887, Congress passed the Electoral Count Act, now codified in Title 3, Chapter 1 of the United States Code, establishing specific procedures for the counting of the electoral votes. The law was passed in response to the disputed 1876 presidential election, in which several states submitted competing slates of electors. Among its provisions, the law established deadlines that the states must meet when selecting their electors, resolving disputes, and when they must cast their electoral votes.

From 1948 to 2022, the date fixed by Congress for the meeting of the Electoral College was "on the first Monday after the second Wednesday in December next following their appointment". As of 2022, with the passing of "S.4573 - Electoral Count Reform and Presidential Transition Improvement Act of 2022", this was changed to be "on the first Tuesday after the second Wednesday in December next following their appointment".

Article II, Section 1, Clause 2, disqualifies all elected and appointed federal officials from being electors. The Office of the Federal Register is charged with administering the Electoral College.

After the vote, each state sends to Congress a certified record of their electoral votes, called the Certificate of Vote. These certificates are opened during a joint session of Congress, held on January 6 unless another date is specified by law, and read aloud by the incumbent vice president, acting in his capacity as president of the Senate. If any person receives an absolute majority of electoral votes, that person is declared the winner. If there is a tie, or if no candidate for either or both offices receives an absolute majority, then choice falls to Congress in a procedure known as a contingent election.

== Modern mechanics ==
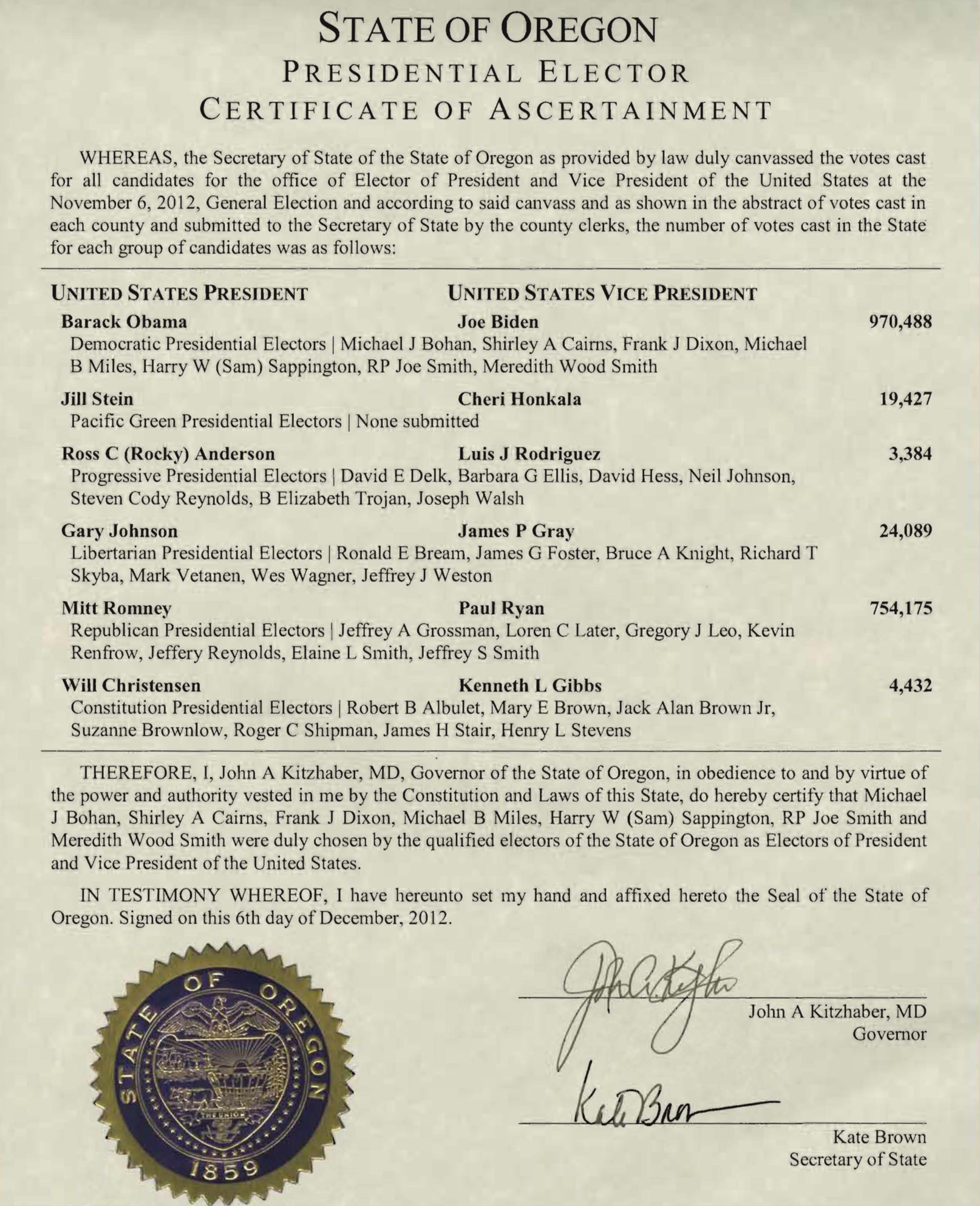
After the popular election in November, a state's Certificate of Ascertainment officially announces the state's electors for the Electoral College. The appointed Electoral College members later meet in the state capital in December to cast their votes.

=== Summary ===
The president and vice president of the United States are elected by the Electoral College, which consists of 538 electors chosen by the fifty states and Washington, D.C. Electors are selected by each state's legislature.

Since the 1824 election, the majority of states have chosen their presidential electors based on winner-take-all results in the statewide popular vote on Election Day.

As of 2020, Maine and Nebraska are exceptions as both use the congressional district method, Maine since 1972 and in Nebraska since 1992. As of 2020, eight states (Note: Arizona, Idaho, Louisiana, North Dakota, Oklahoma, Rhode Island, South Dakota, Tennessee) name the electors on the ballot. Mostly, the "short ballot" is used. The short ballot displays the names of the candidates for president and vice president, rather than the names of prospective electors.the popular vote ballots list the names of the presidential and vice presidential candidates (who run on a ticket). The slate of electors that represent the winning ticket will vote for those two offices. Electors are nominated by the party and, as a rule, vote for the ticket to which they are promised.

Many states require an elector to vote for the candidate to which the elector is pledged, but some "faithless electors" have voted for other candidates or refrained from voting. A candidate must receive an absolute majority of electoral votes (currently 270) to win the presidency or the vice presidency. If no candidate receives a majority in the election for president or vice president, the election is determined via a contingency procedure established by the Twelfth Amendment. In such a situation, the House chooses one of the top three presidential electoral vote winners as the president, while the Senate chooses one of the top two vice presidential electoral vote winners as vice president.

While an aggregate national popular vote total is calculated by state officials, media organizations, and the Federal Election Commission, these votes only indirectly elect the president and vice president.

=== Electors ===
==== Apportionment ====
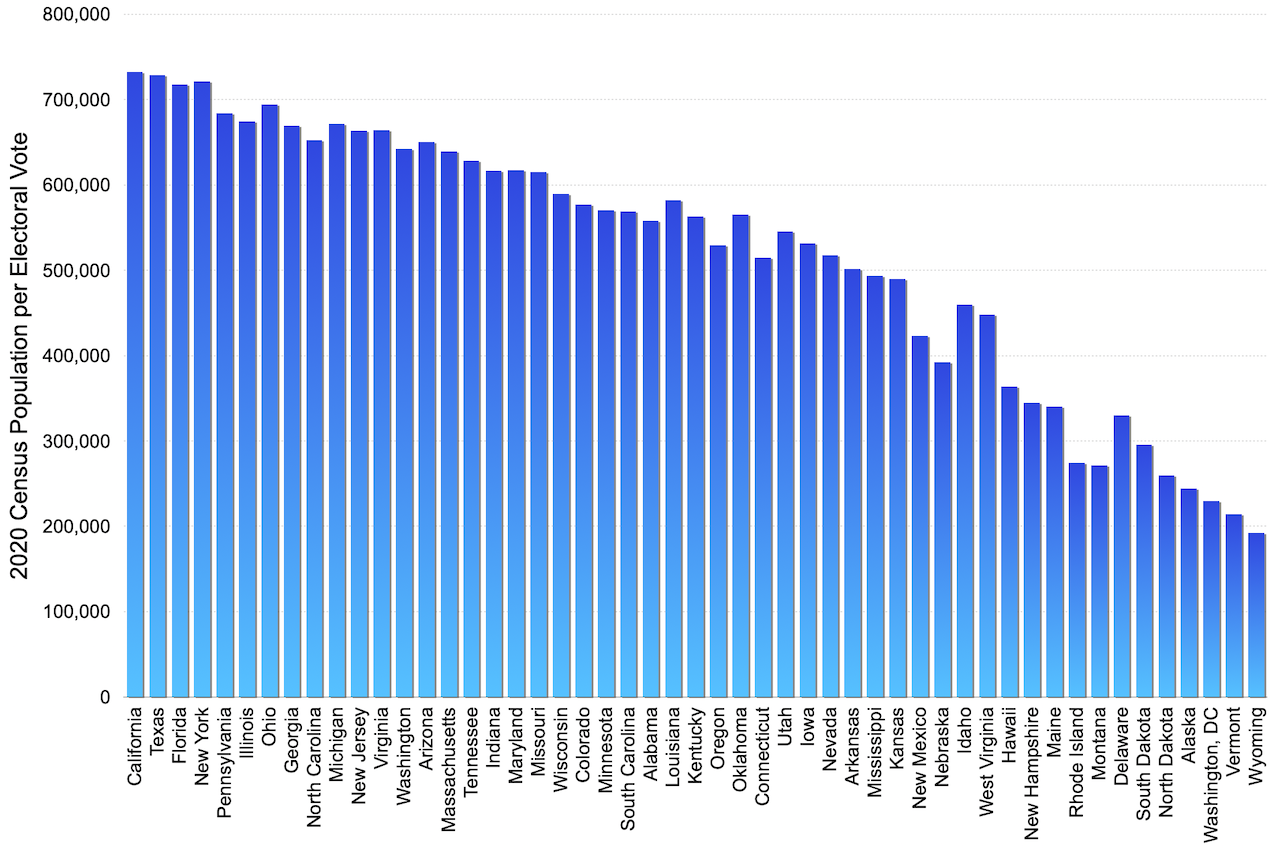
The population per electoral vote for each state and Washington, D.C., 2020 census. A single elector could represent more than 700,000 people, or under 200,000.

A state's number of electors equals the number of representatives plus two electors for the senators the state has in the United States Congress. Each state is entitled to at least one representative, the remaining number of representatives per state is apportioned based on their respective populations, determined every ten years by the United States census. In summary, 153 electors are divided equally among the states and the District of Columbia (3 each), and the remaining 385 are assigned by an apportionment among states.

Under the Twenty-third Amendment, Washington, D.C., is allocated as many electors as it would have if it were a state but no more electors than the least populous state. Because the least populous state (Wyoming, in the 2020 census) has three electors, D.C. cannot have more than three electors. Even if D.C. were a state, its population would entitle it to only three electors. Based on its population per electoral vote, D.C. has the third highest per capita Electoral College representation, after Wyoming and Vermont.

Currently, there are 538 electors, based on 435 representatives, 100 senators from the fifty states and three electors from Washington, D.C. The six states with the most electors are California (54), Texas (40), Florida (30), New York (28), Illinois (19), and Pennsylvania (19). The District of Columbia and the six least populous states—Alaska, Delaware, North Dakota, South Dakota, Vermont, and Wyoming—have three electors each.

==== Nominations ====
The custom of allowing recognized political parties to select a slate of prospective electors developed early. In contemporary practice, each presidential-vice presidential ticket has an associated slate of potential electors. Then on Election Day, the voters select a ticket and thereby select the associated electors.

Candidates for elector are nominated by state chapters of nationally oriented political parties in the months prior to Election Day. In some states, the electors are nominated by voters in primaries the same way other presidential candidates are nominated. In some states, such as Oklahoma, Virginia, and North Carolina, electors are nominated in party conventions. In Pennsylvania, the campaign committee of each candidate names their respective electoral college candidates, an attempt to discourage faithless electors. Varying by state, electors may also be elected by state legislatures or appointed by the parties themselves.

==== Selection process ====
Article II, Section 1, Clause 2 of the Constitution requires each state legislature to determine how electors for the state are to be chosen, but it disqualifies any person holding an Office of Trust or Profit under the United States, from being an elector. Under Section 3 of the Fourteenth Amendment, any person who has sworn an oath to support the United States Constitution in order to hold either a state or federal office, and later rebelled against the United States directly or by giving assistance to those doing so, is disqualified from being an elector. Congress may remove this disqualification by a two-thirds vote in each house.

Eight states name electors on ballots.

All states currently choose presidential electors by their state popular vote. As of 2020, eight states (Note: Arizona, Idaho, Louisiana, North Dakota, Oklahoma, Rhode Island, South Dakota, Tennessee) name the electors on the ballot. Mostly, the "short ballot" is used. The short ballot displays the names of the candidates for president and vice president, rather than the names of prospective electors. Some states support voting for write-in candidates. Those that do may require pre-registration of write-in candidacy, with designation of electors being done at that time. Since 1992, all but two states have followed the winner takes all method of allocating electors by which every person named on the slate for the ticket winning the statewide popular vote are named as presidential electors.

Maine and Nebraska are the only states not using this method. In those states, the winner of the popular vote in each of its congressional districts is awarded one elector, and the winner of the statewide vote is then awarded the state's remaining two electors. This method has been used in Maine since 1972 and in Nebraska since 1992. The Supreme Court previously upheld the power for a state to choose electors on the basis of congressional districts, holding that states possess plenary power to decide how electors are appointed in McPherson v. Blacker, 146 U.S. 1 (1892).

The Tuesday following the first Monday in November has been fixed as the day for holding federal elections, called the Election Day. After the election, each state prepares seven Certificates of Ascertainment, each listing the candidates for president and vice president, their pledged electors, and the total votes each candidacy received. One certificate is sent, as soon after Election Day as practicable, to the National Archivist in Washington. The Certificates of Ascertainment are mandated to carry the state seal and the signature of the governor, or mayor of D.C.

==== Meetings ====
External media

Images
- A 2020 Pennsylvania elector holds a ballot for Joe Biden (Biden's name is handwritten on the blank line). Reuters. December 14, 2020.
- A closeup of the 2020 Georgia Electoral College ballot for Kamala Harris (using a format in which Harris's name is checked on the pre-printed card). The New Yorker. December 18, 2020.

Video
- 2020 California State Electoral College meeting, YouTube video. Reuters. December 14, 2020.

The Electoral College never meets as one body. Electors meet in their respective state capitals (electors for the District of Columbia meet within the District) on the same day (set by Congress as the Tuesday after the second Wednesday in December) at which time they cast their electoral votes on separate ballots for president and vice president. Any in-room media coverage is typically at the state level by local and regional outlets, but more extensively, albeit not comprehensively by C-SPAN, which has footage dating back at least to 2020. California,, Pennsylvania, Michigan, North Carolina, and Illinois electoral meetings have been broadcast. Press access has been allowed to some degree also in Georgia,, Indiana,, Mississippi, Colorado, Ohio, and Texas and New York. At least one (West Virginia's in 2020) has simply been live-streamed.

Although procedures in each state vary slightly, the electors generally follow a similar series of steps, and the Congress has constitutional authority to regulate the procedures the states follow. The meeting is opened by the election certification official—often that state's secretary of state or equivalent—who reads the certificate of ascertainment. This document sets forth who was chosen to cast the electoral votes. The attendance of the electors is taken and any vacancies are noted in writing. The next step is the selection of a president or chairman of the meeting, sometimes also with a vice chairman. The electors sometimes choose a secretary, often not an elector, to take the minutes of the meeting. In many states, political officials give short speeches at this point in the proceedings.

When the time for balloting arrives, the electors choose one or two people to act as tellers. Some states provide for the placing in nomination of a candidate to receive the electoral votes (the candidate for president of the political party of the electors). Each elector submits a written ballot with the name of a candidate for president. Ballot formats vary between the states: in New Jersey for example, the electors cast ballots by checking the name of the candidate on a pre-printed card. In North Carolina, the electors write the name of the candidate on a blank card. The tellers count the ballots and announce the result. The next step is the casting of the vote for vice president, which follows a similar pattern.

Under the Electoral Count Act (updated and codified in 3 U.S.C. § 9), each state's electors must complete six certificates of vote. Each Certificate of Vote (or Certificate of the Vote) must be signed by all of the electors and a certificate of ascertainment must be attached to each of the certificates of vote. Each Certificate of Vote must include the names of those who received an electoral vote for either the office of president or of vice president. The electors certify the Certificates of Vote, and copies of the certificates are then sent in the following fashion:

- One is sent by registered mail to the President of the Senate (the incumbent vice president of the United States);
- Two are sent by registered mail to the Archivist of the United States;
- Two are sent to the state's secretary of state; and
- One is sent to the chief judge of the United States district court where those electors met.

A staff member of the president of the Senate collects the certificates of vote as they arrive and prepares them for the joint session of the Congress. The certificates are arranged—unopened—in alphabetical order and placed in two special mahogany boxes. Alabama through Missouri (including the District of Columbia) are placed in one box and Montana through Wyoming are placed in the other box.

Before 1950, the Secretary of State's office oversaw the certifications. Since then, the Office of Federal Register in the Archivist's office reviews them to make sure the documents sent to the archive and Congress match, and that all formalities have been followed, sometimes requiring states to correct the documents.

==== Faithless electors ====
An elector votes for each office, but at least one of these votes (president or vice president) must be cast for a person who is not a resident of the same state as that elector. A "faithless elector" is one who does not cast an electoral vote for the candidate of the party for whom that elector pledged to vote. Faithless electors are comparatively rare because electors are generally chosen among those who are already personally committed to a party and party's candidate.

Thirty-three states plus the District of Columbia have laws against faithless electors, which were first enforced after the 2016 election, where ten electors voted or attempted to vote contrary to their pledges. Faithless electors have never changed the outcome of a U.S. election for president. Altogether, 23,529 electors have taken part in the Electoral College as of the 2016 election. Only 165 electors have cast votes for someone other than their party's nominee. Of that group, 71 did so because the nominee had died – 63 Democratic Party electors in 1872, when presidential nominee Horace Greeley died; and eight Republican Party electors in 1912, when vice presidential nominee James S. Sherman died.

While faithless electors have never changed the outcome of any presidential election, there are two occasions where the vice presidential election has been influenced by faithless electors:

- In the 1796 election, 18 electors pledged to the Federalist Party ticket cast their first vote as pledged for John Adams, electing him president, but did not cast their second vote for his running mate Thomas Pinckney. As a result, Adams attained 71 electoral votes, Jefferson received 68, and Pinckney received 59, meaning Jefferson, rather than Pinckney, became vice president.
- In the 1836 election, Virginia's 23 electors, who were pledged to Richard Mentor Johnson, voted instead for former U.S. senator William Smith, which left Johnson one vote short of the majority needed to be elected. In accordance with the Twelfth Amendment, a contingent election was held in the Senate between the top two receivers of electoral votes, Johnson and Francis Granger, for vice president, with Johnson being elected on the first ballot.

Some constitutional scholars argued that state restrictions would be struck down if challenged based on Article II and the Twelfth Amendment. However, the United States Supreme Court has consistently ruled that state restrictions are allowed under the Constitution. In Ray v. Blair, 343 U.S. 214 (1952), the court ruled in favor of state laws requiring electors to pledge to vote for the winning candidate, as well as removing electors who refuse to pledge. As stated in the ruling, electors are acting as a functionary of the state, not the federal government. In Chiafalo v. Washington, 591 U.S. ___ (2020), and a related case, the court held that electors must vote in accord with their state's laws. Faithless electors also may face censure from their political party, as they are usually chosen based on their perceived party loyalty.

=== Joint session of Congress ===
External videos
- A joint session of Congress confirms the 2020 electoral college results, YouTube video. Global News. January 6, 2021.

The Twelfth Amendment mandates Congress assemble in joint session to count the electoral votes and declare the winners of the election. The session is ordinarily required to take place on January 6 in the calendar year immediately following the meetings of the presidential electors. Since the Twentieth Amendment, the newly elected joint Congress declares the winner of the election. All elections before 1936 were determined by the outgoing House.

The Office of the Federal Register is charged with administering the Electoral College. The meeting is held at 1 p.m. in the chamber of the U.S. House of Representatives. The sitting vice president is expected to preside, but in several cases the president pro tempore of the Senate has chaired the proceedings. The vice president and the speaker of the House sit at the podium, with the vice president sitting to the right of the speaker of the House. Senate pages bring in two mahogany boxes containing each state's certified vote and place them on tables in front of the senators and representatives. Each house appoints two tellers to count the vote, normally one member of each political party. Relevant portions of the certificate of vote are read for each state, in alphabetical order.

Before an amendment to the law in 2022, members of Congress could object to any state's vote count, provided objection is presented in writing and is signed by at least one member of each house of Congress. In 2022, the number of members required to make an objection was raised to one-fifth of each house. An appropriately made objection is followed by the suspension of the joint session and by separate debates and votes in each house of Congress. After both houses deliberate on the objection, the joint session is resumed.

A state's certificate of vote can be rejected only if both houses of Congress vote to accept the objection via a simple majority, meaning the votes from the state in question are not counted. Individual votes can also be rejected, and are also not counted.

If there are no objections or all objections are overruled, the presiding officer simply includes a state's votes, as declared in the certificate of vote, in the official tally.

After the certificates from all states are read and the respective votes are counted, the presiding officer simply announces the final state of the vote. This announcement concludes the joint session and formalizes the recognition of the president-elect and of the vice president-elect. The senators then depart from the House chamber. The final tally is printed in the Senate and House journals.

==== Historical objections and rejections ====
Objections to the electoral vote count are rarely raised, although it has occurred a few times.

- In 1864, all votes from Louisiana and Tennessee were rejected because of the American Civil War.
- In 1872, all votes from Arkansas and Louisiana plus three of the eleven electoral votes from Georgia were rejected, due to allegations of electoral fraud, and due to submitting votes for a candidate who had died.
- After the crises of the 1876 election, where in a few states it was claimed there were two competing state governments, and thus competing slates of electors, Congress adopted the Electoral Count Act to regularize objection procedure.
- During the vote count in 2001 after the close 2000 presidential election between Governor George W. Bush of Texas and Vice President Al Gore. The election had been controversial, and its outcome was decided by the court case Bush v. Gore. Gore, who as vice president was required to preside over his own Electoral College defeat (by five electoral votes), denied the objections, all of which were raised by representatives and would have favored his candidacy, after no senators would agree to jointly object.
- Objections were raised in the vote count of the 2004 election, alleging voter suppression and machine irregularities in Ohio, and on that occasion one representative and one senator objected, following protocols mandated by the Electoral Count Act. The joint session was suspended as outlined in these protocols, and the objections were quickly disposed of and rejected by both houses of Congress.
- Eleven objections were raised during the vote count for the 2016 election, all by various Democratic representatives. As no senator joined the representatives in any objection, all objections were blocked by Vice President Joe Biden.
- In the 2020 election, there were two objections, and the proceeding was interrupted by an attack on the U.S. Capitol by supporters of outgoing President Donald Trump. Objections to the votes from Arizona and Pennsylvania were each raised by a House member and a senator, and triggered separate debate in each chamber, but were soundly defeated. A few House members raised objections to the votes from Georgia, Michigan, Nevada, and Wisconsin, but they could not move forward because no senator joined in those objections.

=== Contingencies ===
==== Contingent presidential election by House ====
If no candidate for president receives an absolute majority of the electoral votes (since 1964, 270 of the 538 electoral votes), then the Twelfth Amendment requires the House of Representatives to go into session immediately to choose a president. In this event, the House of Representatives is limited to choosing from among the three candidates who received the most electoral votes for president. Each state delegation votes en bloc—each delegation having a single vote. The District of Columbia does not get to vote.

A candidate must receive an absolute majority of state delegation votes (i.e., from 1959, which is the last time a new state was admitted to the union, a minimum of 26 votes) in order for that candidate to become the president-elect. Delegations from at least two thirds of all the states must be present for voting to take place. The House continues balloting until it elects a president.

The House of Representatives has been required to choose the president only twice: in 1801 under Article II, Section 1, Clause 3; and in 1825 under the Twelfth Amendment.

==== Contingent vice presidential election by Senate ====
If no candidate for vice president receives an absolute majority of electoral votes, then the Senate must go into session to choose a vice president. The Senate is limited to choosing from the two candidates who received the most electoral votes for vice president. Normally this would mean two candidates, one less than the number of candidates available in the House vote.

However, the text is written in such a way that all candidates with the most and second-most electoral votes are eligible for the Senate election—this number could theoretically be larger than two. The Senate votes in the normal manner in this case (i.e., ballots are individually cast by each senator, not by state delegations). Two-thirds of the senators must be present for voting to take place.

The Twelfth Amendment states a "majority of the whole number" of senators, currently 51 of 100, is necessary for election. The language requiring an absolute majority of Senate votes precludes the sitting vice president from breaking any tie that might occur, although some academics and journalists have speculated to the contrary.

The only time the Senate chose the vice president was in 1837. In that instance, the Senate adopted an alphabetical roll call and voting aloud. The rules further stated, "[I]f a majority of the number of senators shall vote for either the said Richard M. Johnson or Francis Granger, he shall be declared by the presiding officer of the Senate constitutionally elected Vice President of the United States"; the Senate chose Johnson.

==== Deadlocked election ====
Section 3 of the Twentieth Amendment specifies that if the House of Representatives has not chosen a president-elect in time for the inauguration (noon EST on January 20), then the vice president-elect becomes acting president until the House selects a president. Section 3 also specifies that Congress may statutorily provide for who will be acting president if there is neither a president-elect nor a vice president-elect in time for the inauguration. Under the Presidential Succession Act of 1947, the Speaker of the House would become acting president until either the House selects a president or the Senate selects a vice president. Neither of these situations has ever arisen to this day.

==== Continuity of government and peaceful transitions of power ====
In Federalist No. 68, Alexander Hamilton argued that one concern that led the Constitutional Convention to create the Electoral College was to ensure peaceful transitions of power and continuity of government during transitions between presidential administrations. (Note: "It was ... peculiarly desirable to afford as little opportunity as possible [in the election of the President] to tumult and disorder. ... [The] precautions which have been so happily concerted in the system under consideration, promise an effectual security against this mischief. The choice of several, to form an intermediate body of Electors, will be much less apt to convulse the community, with any extraordinary or violent movements... [As] the Electors, chosen in each State, are to assemble and vote in the State in which they are chosen, this detached and divided situation will expose them much less to heats and ferments, which might be communicated [to] them [by] the People, than if they were all to be convened at one time, in one place.") While recognizing that the question had not been presented in the case, the U.S. Supreme Court stated in the majority opinion in Chiafalo v. Washington (2020) that "nothing in this opinion should be taken to permit the States to bind electors to a deceased candidate" after noting that more than one-third of the cumulative faithless elector votes in U.S. presidential elections history were cast during the 1872 presidential election when Liberal Republican Party and Democratic Party nominee Horace Greeley died after the polls were held and vote tabulations were completed by the states but before the Electoral College cast its ballots, and acknowledging concerns about the potential turmoil that the death of a presidential candidate between Election Day and the Electoral College meetings could cause.

In 1872, Greeley carried the popular vote in 6 states (Georgia, Kentucky, Maryland, Missouri, Tennessee, and Texas) and had 66 electoral votes pledged to him. After his death on November 29, 1872, 63 of the electors pledged to him voted faithlessly, while 3 votes (from Georgia) that remained pledged to him were rejected at the Electoral College vote count on February 12, 1873, on the grounds that he had died. Greeley's running mate, B. Gratz Brown, still received the 3 electoral votes from Georgia for vice president that were rejected for Greeley. This brought Brown's number of electoral votes for vice president to 47 since he still received all 28 electoral votes from Maryland, Tennessee, and Texas, and 16 other electoral votes from Georgia, Kentucky, and Missouri in total. The other 19 electors from the latter states voted faithlessly for vice president.

During the presidential transition following the 1860 presidential election, Abraham Lincoln had to arrive in Washington, D.C. in disguise and on an altered train schedule after the Pinkerton National Detective Agency found evidence that suggested a secessionist plot to assassinate Lincoln would be attempted in Baltimore. During the presidential transition following the 1928 presidential election, an Argentine anarchist group plotted to assassinate Herbert Hoover while Hoover was traveling through Central and South America and crossing the Andes from Chile by train. The plotters were arrested before the attempt was made.

During the presidential transition following the 1932 presidential election, Giuseppe Zangara attempted to assassinate Franklin D. Roosevelt by gunshot while Roosevelt was giving an impromptu speech in a car in Miami, but instead killed Chicago Mayor Anton Cermak, who was a passenger in the car, and wounded 5 bystanders. During the presidential transition following the 1960 presidential election, Richard Paul Pavlick plotted to assassinate John F. Kennedy while Kennedy was vacationing in Palm Beach, Florida, by detonating a dynamite-laden car where Kennedy was staying. Pavlick delayed his attempt and was arrested and committed to a mental hospital.

During the presidential transition following the 2008 presidential election, Barack Obama was targeted in separate security incidents by an assassination plot and a death threat, after an assassination plot in Denver during the 2008 Democratic National Convention and an assassination plot in Tennessee during the election were prevented.

During the presidential transition following the 2020 presidential election, as a result of then-president Donald Trump's false insistence that he had won the election, the General Services Administration did not declare Biden the winner until November 23. The subsequent attack on the United States Capitol on January 6 caused delays in the counting of electoral votes to certify Joe Biden's victory in the 2020 election, but was ultimately unsuccessful in preventing the count from occurring.

Ratified in 1933, Section 3 of the 20th Amendment requires that if a president-elect dies before Inauguration Day, that the vice president-elect becomes the president. Akhil Amar has noted that the explicit text of the 20th Amendment does not specify when the candidates of the winning presidential ticket officially become the president-elect and vice president-elect, and that the text of Article II, Section I and the 12th Amendment suggests that candidates for president and vice president are only formally elected upon the Electoral College vote count. Conversely, a 2020 report issued by the Congressional Research Service (CRS), stated that the balance of scholarly opinion has concluded that the winning presidential ticket is formally elected as soon as the majority of the electoral votes they receive are cast, according to the 1932 House committee report on the 20th Amendment.

If a vacancy on a presidential ticket occurs before Election Day—as in 1912 when Republican nominee for Vice President James S. Sherman died less than a week before the election and was replaced by Nicholas Murray Butler at the Electoral College meetings, and in 1972 when Democratic nominee for Vice President Thomas Eagleton withdrew his nomination less than three weeks after the Democratic National Convention and was replaced by Sargent Shriver—the internal rules of the political parties apply for filling vacancies. If a vacancy on a presidential ticket occurs between Election Day and the Electoral College meetings, the 2020 CRS report notes that most legal commentators have suggested that political parties would still follow their internal rules for filling the vacancies. However, in 1872, the Democratic National Committee did not meet to name a replacement for Horace Greeley, and the 2020 CRS report notes that presidential electors may argue that they are permitted to vote faithlessly if a vacancy occurs between Election Day and the Electoral College meetings since they were pledged to vote for a specific candidate.

Under the Presidential Succession Clause of Article II, Section I, Congress is delegated the power to "by Law provide for the Case of Removal, Death, Resignation or Inability, both of the President and Vice President, declaring what Officer shall then act as President, and such Officer shall act accordingly, until the Disability be removed, or a President shall be elected." (Note: Section 1 of the 25th Amendment superseded the text of the Presidential Succession Clause of Article II, Section I that stated "In Case of the Removal of the President from Office, or of his Death, Resignation, or Inability to discharge the Powers and Duties of the said Office, the Same shall devolve on the Vice President". Instead, Section 1 of the 25th Amendment provides that "In case of the removal of the President from office or of his death or resignation, the Vice President shall become President." Section 2 of the 25th Amendment authorizes the president to nominate a vice president in the event of a vacancy subject to confirmation by both houses of Congress.) (Note: In 1841, the death of William Henry Harrison as president caused debate in Congress about whether John Tyler had formally succeeded to the Presidency or whether he was an acting president. Tyler took the oath of office and Congress implicitly ratified Tyler's decision in documents published subsequent to his ascension that referred to him as "the President of the United States". Tyler's ascension set the precedent that the vice president becomes the president in the event of a vacancy until the ratification of the 25th Amendment.) Pursuant to the Presidential Succession Clause, the 2nd United States Congress passed the Presidential Succession Act of 1792 that required a special election by the Electoral College in the case of a dual vacancy in the presidency and vice presidency. Despite vacancies in the Vice Presidency from 1792 to 1886, (Note: For nearly one-fourth of the period of time from 1792 to 1886, the Vice Presidency was vacant due to the assassinations of Abraham Lincoln and James A. Garfield in 1865 and 1881 respectively, the deaths of Presidents William Henry Harrison and Zachary Taylor in 1841 and 1850 respectively, the deaths of vice presidents George Clinton, Elbridge Gerry, William R. King, Henry Wilson, and Thomas A. Hendricks in 1812, 1814, 1853, 1875, and 1885 respectively, and the resignation of the vice presidency by John C. Calhoun in 1832.) the special election requirement would be repealed with the rest of the Presidential Succession Act of 1792 by the 49th United States Congress in passing the Presidential Succession Act of 1886.

In a special message to the 80th United States Congress calling for revisions to the Presidential Succession Act of 1886, President Harry S. Truman proposed restoring special elections for dual vacancies in the Presidency and Vice Presidency. While most of Truman's proposal was included in the final version of the Presidential Succession Act of 1947, the restoration of special elections for dual vacancies was not. Along with six other recommendations related to presidential succession, the Continuity of Government Commission recommended restoring special elections for president in the event of a dual vacancy in the presidency and vice presidency due to a catastrophic terrorist attack or nuclear strike, in part because all members of the presidential line of succession live and work in Washington, DC, and also due to ambiguities in the Presidential Succession Act of 1947 over whether acting cabinet secretaries are included in the line of the succession.

Under the 12th Amendment, presidential electors are still required to meet and cast their ballots for president and vice president within their respective states. The CRS noted in a separate 2020 report that members of the presidential line of succession, after the vice president, only become an acting president under the Presidential Succession Clause and Section 3 of the 20th Amendment, rather than fully succeeding to the presidency.

=== Current electoral vote distribution ===
Electoral votes (EV) allocations for the 2024 and 2028 presidential elections. Triangular markers (^{▲▼}) indicate gains or losses following the 2020 census.
EV × States	States^{*}
54 × 1 = 54	^{▼}California
40 × 1 = 40	^{▲▲}Texas
30 × 1 = 30	^{▲}Florida
28 × 1 = 28	^{▼}New York
19 × 2 = 38	^{▼}Illinois, ^{▼}Pennsylvania
17 × 1 = 17	^{▼}Ohio
16 × 2 = 32	Georgia, ^{▲}North Carolina
15 × 1 = 15	^{▼}Michigan
14 × 1 = 14	New Jersey
13 × 1 = 13	Virginia
12 × 1 = 12	Washington
11 × 4 = 44	Arizona, Indiana, Massachusetts, Tennessee
10 × 5 = 50	^{▲}Colorado, Maryland, Minnesota, Missouri, Wisconsin
9 × 2 = 18	Alabama, South Carolina
8 × 3 = 24	Kentucky, Louisiana, ^{▲}Oregon
7 × 2 = 14	Connecticut, Oklahoma
6 × 6 = 36	Arkansas, Iowa, Kansas, Mississippi, Nevada, Utah
5 × 2 = 10	Nebraska**, New Mexico
4 × 7 = 28	Hawaii, Idaho, Maine**, ^{▲}Montana, New Hampshire, Rhode Island, ^{▼}West Virginia
3 × 7 = 21	Alaska, Delaware, District of Columbia*, North Dakota, South Dakota, Vermont, Wyoming
= 538	Total electors

* The Twenty-third Amendment grants D.C. the same number of electors as the least populous state. This has always been three.
** Two of Maine's four electors and three of Nebraska's five are distributed using the Congressional district method. The other two in each state are elected as a general ticket based on statewide vote.

== Chronological table ==
Bolded numbers indicate the highest amount of electoral votes that a state had at one time.

Number of presidential electors by state and year
Election year		1788–1800			1804–1900																		1904–2000											2004–		
Election year		'88	'92	'96 '00	'04 '08	'12	'16	'20	'24 '28	'32	'36 '40	'44	'48	'52 '56	'60	'64	'68	'72	'76 '80	'84 '88	'92	'96 '00	'04	'08	'12 '16 '20 '24 '28	'32 '36 '40	'44 '48	'52 '56	'60	'64 '68	'72 '76 '80	'84 '88	'92 '96 '00	'04 '08	'12 '16 '20	'24 '28
#	Total	81	135	138	176	218	221	235	261	288	294	275	290	296	303	234 251	294	366	369	401	444	447	476	483	531				537	538						
	State																																			
22	Alabama							3	5	7	7	9	9	9	9	0	8	10	10	10	11	11	11	11	**12**	11	11	11	11	10	9	9	9	9	9	9
49	Alaska																												**3**	**3**	**3**	**3**	**3**	**3**	**3**	**3**
48	Arizona																								3	3	4	4	4	5	6	7	8	10	**11**	**11**
25	Arkansas										3	3	3	4	4	0	5	6	6	7	8	8	**9**	**9**	**9**	**9**	**9**	8	8	6	6	6	6	6	6	6
31	California													4	4	5	5	6	6	8	9	9	10	10	13	22	25	32	32	40	45	47	54	**55**	**55**	54
38	Colorado																		3	3	4	4	5	5	6	6	6	6	6	6	7	8	8	9	9	**10**
5	Connecticut	7	**9**	**9**	**9**	**9**	**9**	**9**	8	8	8	6	6	6	6	6	6	6	6	6	6	6	7	7	7	8	8	8	8	8	8	8	8	7	7	7
–	D.C.																													**3**	**3**	**3**	**3**	**3**	**3**	**3**
1	Delaware	3	3	3	3	**4**	**4**	**4**	3	3	3	3	3	3	3	3	3	3	3	3	3	3	3	3	3	3	3	3	3	3	3	3	3	3	3	3
27	Florida												3	3	3	0	3	4	4	4	4	4	5	5	6	7	8	10	10	14	17	21	25	27	29	**30**
4	Georgia	5	4	4	6	8	8	8	9	11	11	10	10	10	10	0	9	11	11	12	13	13	13	13	14	12	12	12	12	12	12	12	13	15	**16**	**16**
50	Hawaii																												3	**4**	**4**	**4**	**4**	**4**	**4**	**4**
43	Idaho																				3	3	3	3	**4**	**4**	**4**	**4**	**4**	**4**	**4**	**4**	**4**	**4**	**4**	**4**
21	Illinois							3	3	5	5	9	9	11	11	16	16	21	21	22	24	24	27	27	**29**	**29**	28	27	27	26	26	24	22	21	20	19
19	Indiana						3	3	5	9	9	12	12	13	13	13	13	**15**	**15**	**15**	**15**	**15**	**15**	**15**	**15**	14	13	13	13	13	13	12	12	11	11	11
29	Iowa												4	4	4	8	8	11	11	**13**	**13**	**13**	**13**	**13**	**13**	11	10	10	10	9	8	8	7	7	6	6
34	Kansas															3	3	5	5	9	**10**	**10**	**10**	**10**	**10**	9	8	8	8	7	7	7	6	6	6	6
15	Kentucky		4	4	8	12	12	12	14	**15**	**15**	12	12	12	12	11	11	12	12	13	13	13	13	13	13	11	11	10	10	9	9	9	8	8	8	8
18	Louisiana					3	3	3	5	5	5	6	6	6	6	7	7	8	8	8	8	8	9	9	**10**	**10**	**10**	**10**	**10**	**10**	**10**	**10**	9	9	8	8
23	Maine							9	9	**10**	**10**	9	9	8	8	7	7	7	7	6	6	6	6	6	6	5	5	5	5	4	4	4	4	4	4	4
7	Maryland	8	10	10	**11**	**11**	**11**	**11**	**11**	10	10	8	8	8	8	7	7	8	8	8	8	8	8	8	8	8	8	9	9	10	10	10	10	10	10	10
6	Massachusetts	10	16	16	19	**22**	**22**	15	15	14	14	12	12	13	13	12	12	13	13	14	15	15	16	16	18	17	16	16	16	14	14	13	12	12	11	11
26	Michigan										3	5	5	6	6	8	8	11	11	13	14	14	14	14	15	19	19	20	20	**21**	**21**	20	18	17	16	15
32	Minnesota														4	4	4	5	5	7	9	9	11	11	**12**	11	11	11	11	10	10	10	10	10	10	10
20	Mississippi							3	3	4	4	6	6	7	7	0	0	8	8	9	9	9	**10**	**10**	**10**	9	9	8	8	7	7	7	7	6	6	6
24	Missouri							3	3	4	4	7	7	9	9	11	11	15	15	16	17	17	**18**	**18**	**18**	15	15	13	13	12	12	11	11	11	10	10
41	Montana																				3	3	3	3	**4**	**4**	**4**	**4**	**4**	**4**	**4**	**4**	3	3	3	**4**
37	Nebraska																3	3	3	5	**8**	**8**	**8**	**8**	**8**	7	6	6	6	5	5	5	5	5	5	5
36	Nevada															3	3	3	3	3	3	3	3	3	3	3	3	3	3	3	3	4	4	5	**6**	**6**
9	New Hampshire	5	6	6	7	**8**	**8**	**8**	**8**	7	7	6	6	5	5	5	5	5	5	4	4	4	4	4	4	4	4	4	4	4	4	4	4	4	4	4
3	New Jersey	6	7	7	8	8	8	8	8	8	8	7	7	7	7	7	7	9	9	9	10	10	12	12	14	16	16	16	16	**17**	**17**	16	15	15	14	14
47	New Mexico																								3	3	4	4	4	4	4	**5**	**5**	**5**	**5**	**5**
11	New York	8	12	12	19	29	29	29	36	42	42	36	36	35	35	33	33	35	35	36	36	36	39	39	45	**47**	**47**	45	45	43	41	36	33	31	29	28
12	North Carolina		12	12	14	15	15	15	15	15	15	11	11	10	10	0	9	10	10	11	11	11	12	12	12	13	14	14	14	13	13	13	14	15	15	**16**
39	North Dakota																				3	3	4	4	**5**	4	4	4	4	4	3	3	3	3	3	3
17	Ohio				3	8	8	8	16	21	21	23	23	23	23	21	21	22	22	23	23	23	23	23	24	**26**	25	25	25	**26**	25	23	21	20	18	17
46	Oklahoma																							7	10	**11**	10	8	8	8	8	8	8	7	7	7
33	Oregon														3	3	3	3	3	3	4	4	4	4	5	5	6	6	6	6	6	7	7	7	7	**8**
2	Pennsylvania	10	15	15	20	25	25	25	28	30	30	26	26	27	27	26	26	29	29	30	32	32	34	34	**38**	36	35	32	32	29	27	25	23	21	20	19
13	Rhode Island		4	4	4	4	4	4	4	4	4	4	4	4	4	4	4	4	4	4	4	4	4	4	**5**	4	4	4	4	4	4	4	4	4	4	4
8	South Carolina	7	8	8	10	**11**	**11**	**11**	**11**	**11**	**11**	9	9	8	8	0	6	7	7	9	9	9	9	9	9	8	8	8	8	8	8	8	8	8	9	9
40	South Dakota																				4	4	4	4	**5**	4	4	4	4	4	4	3	3	3	3	3
16	Tennessee			3	5	8	8	8	11	**15**	**15**	13	13	12	12	10	10	12	12	12	12	12	12	12	12	11	12	11	11	11	10	11	11	11	11	11
28	Texas												4	4	4	0	0	8	8	13	15	15	18	18	20	23	23	24	24	25	26	29	32	34	38	**40**
45	Utah																					3	3	3	4	4	4	4	4	4	4	5	5	5	**6**	**6**
14	Vermont		4	4	6	8	**8**	**8**	7	7	7	6	6	5	5	5	5	5	5	4	4	4	4	4	4	3	3	3	3	3	3	3	3	3	3	3
10	Virginia	12	21	21	24	**25**	**25**	**25**	24	23	23	17	17	15	15	0	0	11	11	12	12	12	12	12	12	11	11	12	12	12	12	12	13	13	13	13
42	Washington																				4	4	5	5	7	8	8	9	9	9	9	10	11	11	**12**	**12**
35	West Virginia															5	5	5	5	6	6	6	7	7	**8**	**8**	**8**	**8**	**8**	7	6	6	5	5	5	4
30	Wisconsin												4	5	5	8	8	10	10	11	12	12	**13**	**13**	**13**	12	12	12	12	12	11	11	11	10	10	10
44	Wyoming																				**3**	**3**	**3**	**3**	**3**	**3**	**3**	**3**	**3**	**3**	**3**	**3**	**3**	**3**	**3**	**3**
#	Total	81	135	138	176	218	221	235	261	288	294	275	290	296	303	234 251	294	366	369	401	444	447	476	483	531				537	538						

Source: Presidential Elections 1789–2000 at Psephos (Adam Carr's Election Archive)
Note: In 1788, 1792, 1796, and 1800, each elector cast two votes for president.

This cartogram shows the number of electors from each state for the 2024 and 2028 presidential elections. Following the 2020 census, 7 states lost one electoral vote, (Note: California, Illinois, Michigan, New York, Ohio, Pennsylvania, West Virginia) 5 states gained one, (Note: Colorado, Florida, Montana, North Carolina, Oregon) and Texas gained two.

== Alternative methods of choosing electors ==
Methods of presidential elector selection, by state, 1789–1832.
Year	AL	CT	DE	GA	IL	IN	KY	LA	ME	MD	MA	MS	MO	NH	NJ	NY	NC	OH	PA	RI	SC	TN	VT	VA
1789	–	L	D	L	–	–	–	–	–	A	H	–	–	H	L	–	–	–	A	–	L	–	–	D
1792	–	L	L	L	–	–	D	–	–	A	H	–	–	H	L	L	L	–	A	L	L	–	L	D
1796	–	L	L	A	–	–	D	–	–	D	H	–	–	H	L	L	D	–	A	L	L	H	L	D
1800	–	L	L	L	–	–	D	–	–	D	L	–	–	L	L	L	D	–	L	A	L	H	L	A
1804	–	L	L	L	–	–	D	–	–	D	D	–	–	A	A	L	D	A	A	A	L	D	L	A
1808	–	L	L	L	–	–	D	–	–	D	L	–	–	A	A	L	D	A	A	A	L	D	L	A
1812	–	L	L	L	–	–	D	L	–	D	D	–	–	A	L	L	L	A	A	A	L	D	L	A
1816	–	L	L	L	–	L	D	L	–	D	L	–	–	A	A	L	A	A	A	A	L	D	L	A
1820	L	A	L	L	D	L	D	L	D	D	D	A	L	A	A	L	A	A	A	A	L	D	L	A
1824	A	A	L	L	D	A	D	L	D	D	A	A	D	A	A	L	A	A	A	A	L	D	L	A
1828	A	A	L	A	A	A	A	A	D	D	A	A	A	A	A	D	A	A	A	A	L	D	A	A
1832	A	A	A	A	A	A	A	A	A	D	A	A	A	A	A	A	A	A	A	A	L	A	A	A
Year	AL	CT	DE	GA	IL	IN	KY	LA	ME	MD	MA	MS	MO	NH	NJ	NY	NC	OH	PA	RI	SC	TN	VT	VA

Key	A	Popular vote, At-large	D	Popular vote, Districting	L	Legislative selection	H	Hybrid system

Before the advent of the "short ballot" in the early 20th century (as described in Selection process) the most common means of electing the presidential electors was through the general ticket. The general ticket is quite similar to the current system and is often confused with it. In the general ticket, voters cast ballots for individuals running for presidential elector. In the short ballot, voters cast ballots for an entire slate of electors.

In the general ticket, the state canvass would report the number of votes cast for each candidate for elector, a complicated process in states like New York with multiple positions to fill. Both the general ticket and the short ballot are often considered at-large or winner-takes-all voting. The short ballot was adopted by the various states at different times. It was adopted for use by North Carolina and Ohio in 1932. Alabama was still using the general ticket as late as 1960 and was one of the last states to switch to the short ballot.

The question of the extent to which state constitutions may constrain the legislature's choice of a method of choosing electors has been touched on in two U.S. Supreme Court cases. In McPherson v. Blacker, 146 U.S. 1 (1892), the Court cited Article II, Section 1, Clause 2 which states that a state's electors are selected "in such manner as the legislature thereof may direct" and wrote these words "operat[e] as a limitation upon the state in respect of any attempt to circumscribe the legislative power".

In Bush v. Palm Beach County Canvassing Board, 531 U.S. 70 (2000), a Florida Supreme Court decision was vacated (not reversed) based on McPherson. On the other hand, three dissenting justices in Bush v. Gore, 531 U.S. 98 (2000), wrote: "[N]othing in Article II of the Federal Constitution frees the state legislature from the constraints in the State Constitution that created it."

=== Appointment by state legislature ===
In the earliest presidential elections, state legislative choice was the most common method of choosing electors. A majority of the state legislatures selected presidential electors in both 1792 (9 of 15) and 1800 (10 of 16), and half of them did so in 1812. Even in the 1824 election, a quarter of state legislatures (6 of 24) chose electors. In that election, Andrew Jackson lost in spite of having a plurality of both the popular vote and the number of electoral votes representing them. Yet, as six states did not hold a popular election for their electoral votes, the full expression of the popular vote nationally cannot be known.

Some state legislatures simply chose electors. Other states used a hybrid method in which state legislatures chose from a group of electors elected by popular vote. By 1828, with the rise of Jacksonian democracy, only Delaware and South Carolina used legislative choice. Delaware ended its practice the following election (1832). South Carolina continued using the method until it seceded from the Union in December 1860. South Carolina used the popular vote for the first time in the 1868 election.

Excluding South Carolina, legislative appointment was used in only four situations after 1832:

- In 1848, Massachusetts statute awarded the state's electoral votes to the winner of the at-large popular vote, but only if that candidate won an absolute majority. When the vote produced no winner between the Democratic, Free Soil, and Whig parties, the state legislature selected the electors, giving all 12 electoral votes to the Whigs, which had won the plurality of votes in the state.
- In 1864, Nevada, having joined the Union only a few days prior to Election Day, had no choice but to legislatively appoint.
- In 1868, the newly reconstructed state of Florida legislatively appointed its electors, having been readmitted too late to hold elections.
- In 1876, the legislature of the newly admitted state of Colorado used legislative choice due to a lack of time and money to hold a popular election.

Legislative appointment was brandished as a possibility in the 2000 election. Had the recount continued, the Florida legislature was prepared to appoint the Republican slate of electors to avoid missing the federal safe-harbor deadline for choosing electors.

The Constitution gives each state legislature the power to decide how its state's electors are chosen and it can be easier and cheaper for a state legislature to simply appoint a slate of electors than to create a legislative framework for holding elections to determine the electors. As noted above, the two situations in which legislative choice has been used since the Civil War have both been because there was not enough time or money to prepare for an election. However, appointment by state legislature can have negative consequences: bicameral legislatures can deadlock more easily than the electorate. This is precisely what happened to New York in 1789 when the legislature failed to appoint any electors.

=== Electoral districts ===
Another method used early in U.S. history was to divide the state into electoral districts. By this method, voters in each district would cast their ballots for the electors they supported and the winner in each district would become the elector. This was similar to how states are currently separated into congressional districts. The difference stems from the fact that every state always had two more electoral districts than congressional districts. As with congressional districts, this method is vulnerable to gerrymandering.

=== Congressional district method ===
Projected results of the 2020 United States presidential election using one of the Congressional district methods

There are two versions of the congressional district method: one has been implemented in Maine and Nebraska; another was used in New York in 1828 and proposed for use in Virginia. Under the implemented method, electors are awarded the way seats in Congress are awarded. One electoral vote goes per the plurality of the popular votes of each congressional district (for the U.S. House of Representatives), and two per the statewide popular vote. This may result in greater proportionality. But it can give results similar to the winner-takes-all states, as in 1992, when George H. W. Bush won all five of Nebraska's electoral votes with a clear plurality on 47% of the vote; in a truly proportional system, he would have received three and Bill Clinton and Ross Perot each would have received one.

In 2013, the Virginia proposal was tabled. Like the other congressional district methods, this would have distributed the electoral votes based on the popular vote winner within each of Virginia's 11 congressional districts; the two statewide electoral votes would be awarded based on which candidate won the most congressional districts. A similar method was used in New York in 1828: the two at large electors were elected by the electors selected in districts.

A congressional district method is more likely to arise than other alternatives to the winner-takes-whole-state method, in view of the main two parties' resistance to scrap first-past-the-post. State legislation is sufficient to use this method. Advocates of the method believe the system encourages higher voter turnout or incentivizes candidates, to visit and appeal to some states deemed safe, overall, for one party.

Winner-take-all systems ignore thousands of votes. In Democratic California there are Republican districts, in Republican Texas there are Democratic districts. Because candidates have an incentive to campaign in competitive districts, with a district plan, candidates have an incentive to actively campaign in over thirty states versus about seven "swing" states. Opponents of the system argue that candidates might only spend time in certain battleground districts instead of the entire state and cases of gerrymandering could become exacerbated as political parties attempt to draw as many safe districts as they can.

Unlike simple congressional district comparisons, the district plan popular vote bonus in the 2008 election would have given Obama 56% of the Electoral College versus the 68% he did win; it "would have more closely approximated the percentage of the popular vote won [53%]". However, the district plan would have given Obama 49% of the Electoral College in 2012, and would have given Romney a win in the Electoral College even though Obama won the popular vote by nearly 4% (51.1–47.2) over Romney.

==== Implementation ====
Of the 44 multi-district states whose 517 electoral votes are amenable to the method, only Maine (4 EV) and Nebraska (5 EV) apply it. Maine began using the congressional district method in the election of 1972. Nebraska has used the congressional district method since the election of 1992. Michigan used the system for the 1892 presidential election, and several other states used various forms of the district plan before 1840: Virginia, Delaware, Maryland, Kentucky, North Carolina, Massachusetts, Illinois, Maine, Missouri, and New York.

The congressional district method allows a state the chance to split its electoral votes between multiple candidates. Prior to 2008, Nebraska had never split its electoral votes, while Maine had only done so once under its previous district plan in the 1828 election. Nebraska split its electoral votes for the first time in 2008, giving John McCain its statewide electors and those of two congressional districts, while Barack Obama won the electoral vote of Nebraska's 2nd congressional district, centered on the state's largest city, Omaha. Following the 2008 split, some Nebraska Republicans made efforts to discard the congressional district method and return to the winner-takes-all system. In January 2010, a bill was introduced in the Nebraska legislature to revert to a winner-take-all system; the bill died in committee in March 2011. Republicans had passed bills in 1995 and 1997 to do the same, which were vetoed by Democratic Governor Ben Nelson.

More recently, Maine split its electoral votes for the first time under the congressional district method in 2016. Hillary Clinton won its two statewide electors and its 1st congressional district, which covers the state's southwestern coastal region and its largest city of Portland, while Donald Trump won the electoral vote of Maine's 2nd congressional district, which takes in the remainder of the state and is much larger by area. In the 2020 election, both Nebraska and Maine split their electoral votes, following the same pattern of congressional district differences that were seen in 2008 and 2016 respectively: Nebraska's 2nd congressional district voted for Democrat Joe Biden while the remainder of the state voted for Republican Donald Trump; and Maine's 2nd congressional district voted for Trump while the remainder of the state voted for Biden.

==== Recent abandoned adoption in other states ====
In 2010, Republicans in Pennsylvania, who controlled both houses of the legislature as well as the governorship, put forward a plan to change the state's winner-takes-all system to a congressional district method system. Pennsylvania had voted for the Democratic candidate in the five previous presidential elections, so this was seen an attempt to take away Democratic electoral votes. Democrat Barack Obama won Pennsylvania in 2008 with 55% of its vote. The district plan would have awarded him 11 of its 21 electoral votes, a 52.4% which was much closer to the popular vote percentage. The plan later lost support. Other Republicans, including Michigan state representative Pete Lund, RNC Chairman Reince Priebus, and Wisconsin Governor Scott Walker, have floated similar ideas.

=== Proportional vote ===
In a proportional system, electors would be selected in proportion to the votes cast for their candidate or party, rather than being selected by the statewide plurality vote.

== Impacts and reception ==
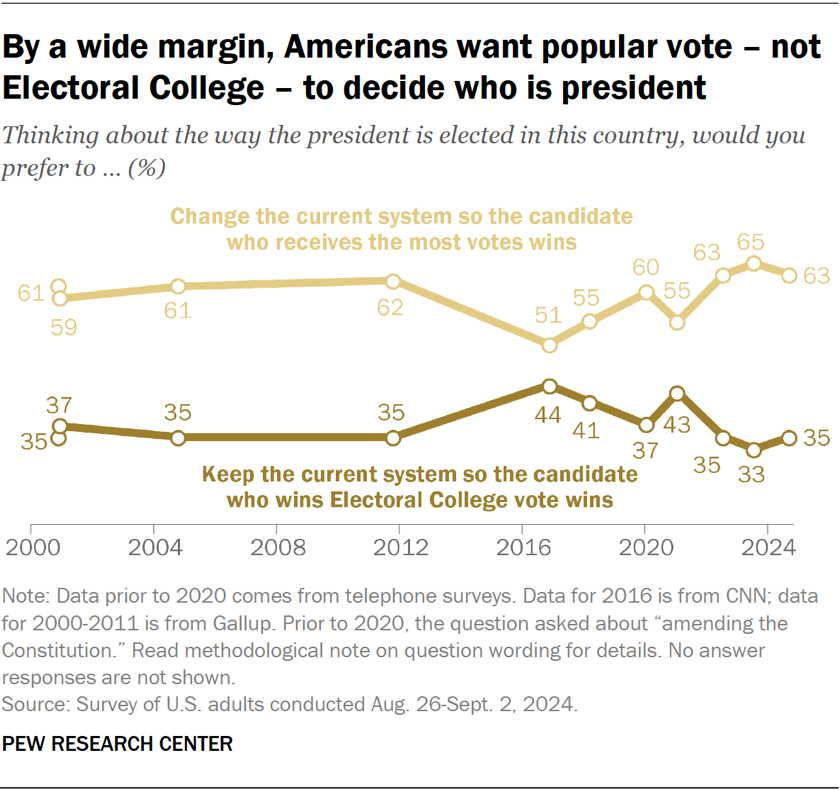
Polling. Pew Research Center.

Gary Bugh's research of congressional debates over proposed constitutional amendments to abolish the Electoral College reveals reform opponents have often appealed to tradition and the preference for indirect elections, whereas reform advocates often champion a more egalitarian one person, one vote system. Electoral colleges have been scrapped by all other democracies around the world in favor of direct elections for an executive president.

Critics argue that the Electoral College is less democratic than a national direct popular vote and is subject to manipulation because of faithless electors; that the system is antithetical to a democracy that strives for a standard of "one person, one vote"; and there can be elections where one candidate wins the national popular vote but another wins the electoral vote, as in the 2000 and 2016 elections. Individual citizens in less populated states with 5% of the Electoral College have proportionately more voting power than those in more populous states, and candidates can win by focusing on just a few "swing states".

=== Polling ~40% ===
Twenty-first century polling data shows that a majority of Americans consistently favor having a direct popular vote for presidential elections. The popularity of the Electoral College has hovered between 35% and 44%. (Note: Americans favored a Constitutional Amendment to elect the president by a nationwide popular vote on average 61% and those for electoral college selection 35%. In 2016 polling, the gap closed to 51% direct election versus 44% electoral college. By 2020, American thinking had again diverged with 58% for direct election versus 40% for the electoral college choosing a president.)

=== Difference from popular vote ===
This graphic demonstrates how the winner of the popular vote can still lose in an electoral college system similar to the U.S. Electoral College.

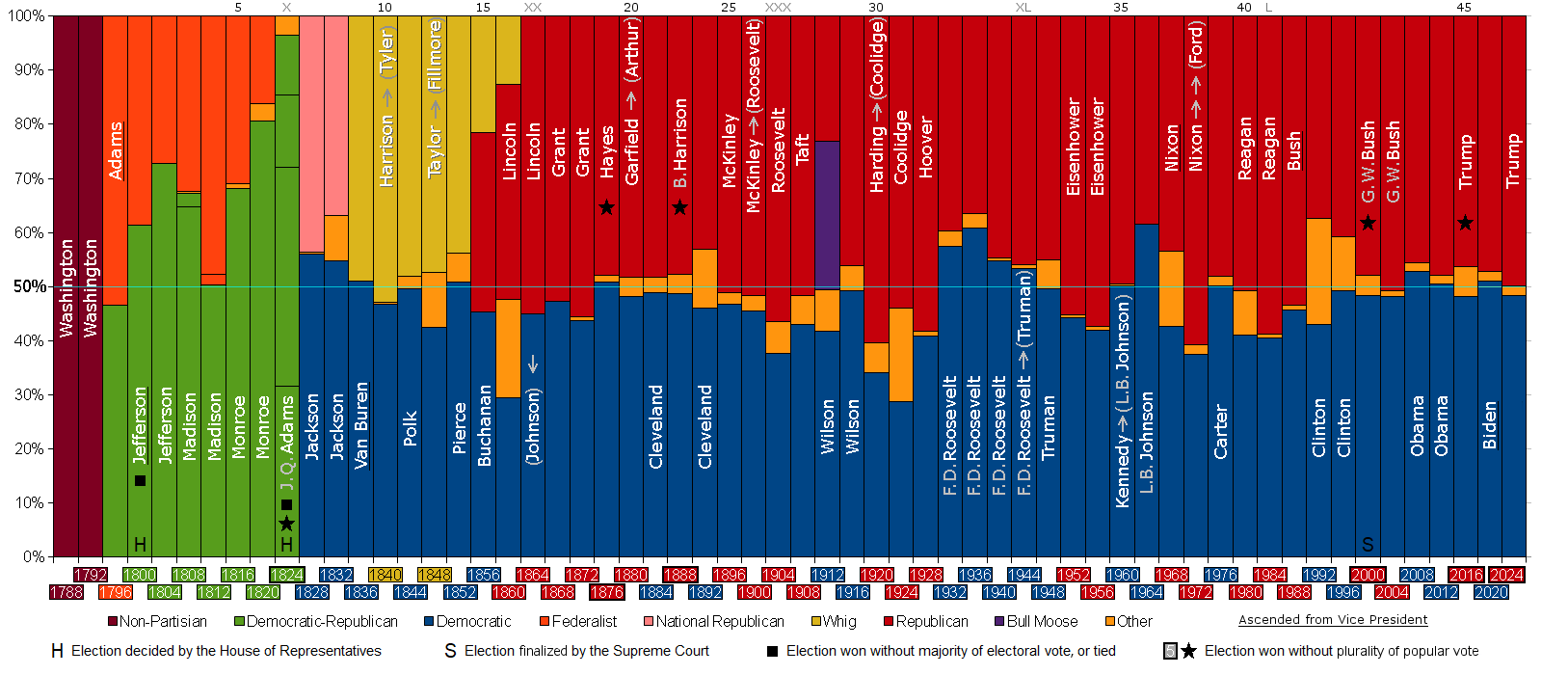
A bar graph of popular votes in presidential elections, to 2024. Black stars mark the five cases where the winner did not have the plurality of the popular vote. Black squares mark the two cases where the electoral vote resulted in a tie, or the winner did not have the majority of electoral votes. An H marks each of two cases where the election was decided by the House. An S marks the one case where the election was finalized by the Supreme Court.

Opponents of the Electoral College claim such outcomes do not logically follow the normative concept of how a democratic system should function. One view is the Electoral College violates the principle of political equality, since presidential elections are not decided by the one-person one-vote principle.

While many assume the national popular vote observed under the Electoral College system would reflect the popular vote observed under a National Popular Vote system, supporters contend that is not necessarily the case as each electoral institution produces different incentives for, and strategy choices by, presidential campaigns.

==== Notable elections ====
The elections of 1876, 1888, 2000, and 2016 produced an Electoral College winner who did not receive at least a plurality of the nationwide popular vote. In 1824, there were six states in which electors were legislatively appointed, rather than popularly elected, so it is uncertain what the national popular vote would have been if all presidential electors had been popularly elected. When no presidential candidate received a majority of electoral votes in 1824, the election was decided by the House of Representatives and so could be considered distinct from the latter four elections in which all of the states had popular selection of electors. The true national popular vote was also uncertain in the 1960 election, and the plurality for the winner depends on how votes for Alabama electors are allocated.

Elections where the popular vote and electoral college results differed

- 1800: Jefferson won with 61.4% of the popular vote; Adams had 38.6%*
- 1824: Adams won with 30.9% of the popular vote; Jackson had 41.4%*
- 1836 (only for vice president): Johnson won with 63.5% of the popular vote; Granger had 30.8%*
- 1876: Tilden (D) received 50.9% of the vote, Hayes (R) received 47.9%
- 1888: Cleveland (D) received 48.6% of the vote, Harrison (R) received 47.8%
- 2000: Gore (D) received 48.4% of the vote, Bush (R) received 47.9%
- 2016: Clinton (D) received 48.2% of the vote, Trump (R) received 46.1%

*These popular vote tallies are partial because several of the states still used their legislature to choose electors not a popular vote. In both elections a tied electoral college threw the contest over to Congress to decide.

=== Favors largest swing states ===
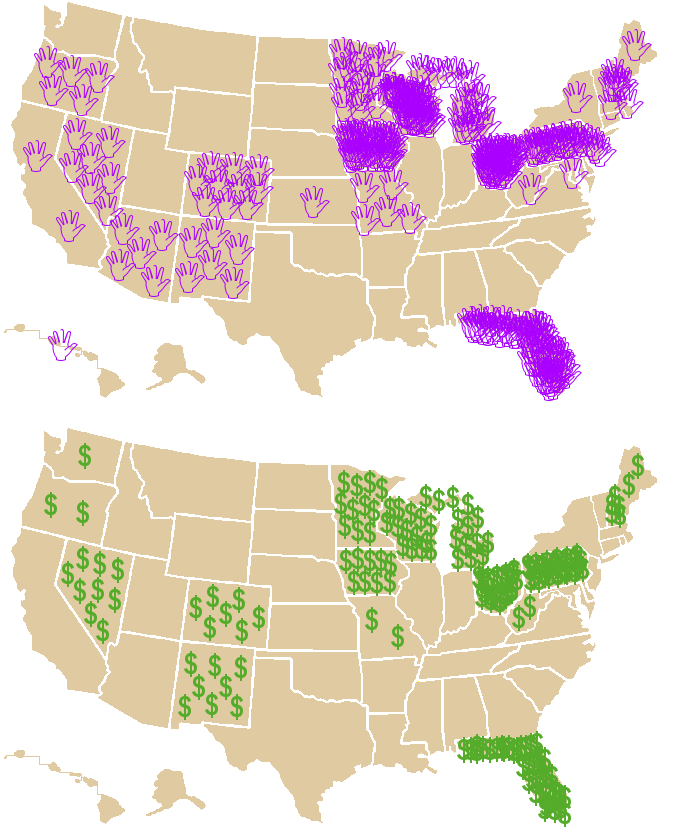
These maps show the amount of attention given to each state by the Bush and Kerry campaigns, combined, during the final five weeks of the 2004 election. Each waving hand (purple map) represents a visit from a presidential or vice presidential candidate. Each dollar sign (green map) represents one million dollars spent on TV advertising.

The Electoral College encourages political campaigners to focus on a few so-called swing states while ignoring the rest of the country. Populous states in which pre-election poll results show no clear favorite are inundated with campaign visits, saturation television advertising, get-out-the-vote efforts by party organizers, and debates, while four out of five voters in the national election are "absolutely ignored", according to one assessment. Since most states use a winner-takes-all arrangement in which the candidate with the most votes in that state receives all of the state's electoral votes, there is a clear incentive to focus almost exclusively on only a few key undecided states.

=== Not all votes count the same ===
Each state gets a minimum of three electoral votes, regardless of population, which has increasingly given low-population states more electors per voter (or more voting power). For example, an electoral vote represents nearly four times as many people in California as in Wyoming. On average, voters in the ten least populated states have 2.5 more electors per person compared with voters in the ten most populous states.

In 1968, John F. Banzhaf III developed the Banzhaf power index (BPI) which argued that a voter in the state of New York had, on average, 3.3 times as much voting power in presidential elections as the average voter outside New York. Mark Livingston used a similar method and estimated that individual voters in the largest state, based on the 1990 census, had 3.3 times more individual power to choose a president than voters of Montana.

However, others argue that Banzhaf's method ignores the demographic makeup of the states and treats votes like independent coin-flips. Critics of Banzhaf's method say empirically based models used to analyze the Electoral College have consistently found that sparsely populated states benefit from having their resident's votes count for more than the votes of those residing in the more populous states.

=== Lowers turnout ===
Except in closely fought swing states, voter turnout does not affect the election results due to entrenched political party domination in most states. The Electoral College decreases the advantage a political party or campaign might gain for encouraging voters to turn out, except in those swing states. If the presidential election were decided by a national popular vote, in contrast, campaigns and parties would have a strong incentive to work to increase turnout everywhere.

Individuals would similarly have a stronger incentive to persuade their friends and neighbors to turn out to vote. The differences in turnout between swing states and non-swing states under the current electoral college system suggest that replacing the Electoral College with direct election by popular vote would likely increase turnout and participation significantly.

=== Obscures disenfranchisement within states ===
Legal scholars Akhil Amar and Vikram Amar have argued that the original Electoral College compromise was enacted partially because it enabled Southern states to disenfranchise their slave populations. It permitted Southern states to disfranchise large numbers of slaves while allowing these states to maintain political clout and prevent Northern dominance within the federation by using the Three-Fifths Compromise. They noted that James Madison believed the question of counting slaves had presented a serious challenge, but that "the substitution of electors obviated this difficulty and seemed on the whole to be liable to the fewest objections." Akhil and Vikram Amar added:

The founders' system also encouraged the continued disfranchisement of women. In a direct national election system, any state that gave women the vote would automatically have doubled its national clout. Under the Electoral College, however, a state had no such incentive to increase the franchise; as with slaves, what mattered was how many women lived in a state, not how many were empowered ... a state with low voter turnout gets precisely the same number of electoral votes as if it had a high turnout. By contrast, a well-designed direct election system could spur states to get out the vote.

After the Thirteenth Amendment abolished slavery, southern states benefited from elimination of the Three-Fifths Compromise because with all former slaves counted as one person, instead of 3/5, Southern states increased their share of electors in the Electoral College. This also gave African-Americans more representation and voting power during Reconstruction. Southern states were the first to elect African-Americans to Congress including America's first black Senator from Mississippi. Southern states later enacted laws that restricted voting access to voting to African-Americans, thereby increasing the electoral weight of votes by southern whites.

Minorities tend to be disproportionately located in noncompetitive states, reducing their impact on the overall election and over-representing white voters who have tended to live in the swing states that decide elections.

=== Americans in U.S. territories cannot vote ===
Roughly four million Americans in Puerto Rico, the Northern Mariana Islands, the U.S. Virgin Islands, American Samoa, and Guam, do not have a vote in presidential elections. Only U.S. states (per Article II, Section 1, Clause 2) and Washington, D.C. (per the Twenty-third Amendment) are entitled to electors. Various scholars consequently conclude that the U.S. national-electoral process is not fully democratic. Guam has held non-binding straw polls for president since the 1980s to draw attention to this fact. The Democratic and Republican parties, as well as other third parties, have, however, made it possible for people in U.S. territories to vote in party presidential primaries.

=== Disadvantages third parties ===
In practice, the winner-take-all manner of allocating a state's electors generally decreases the importance of minor parties.

=== Federalism and state power ===
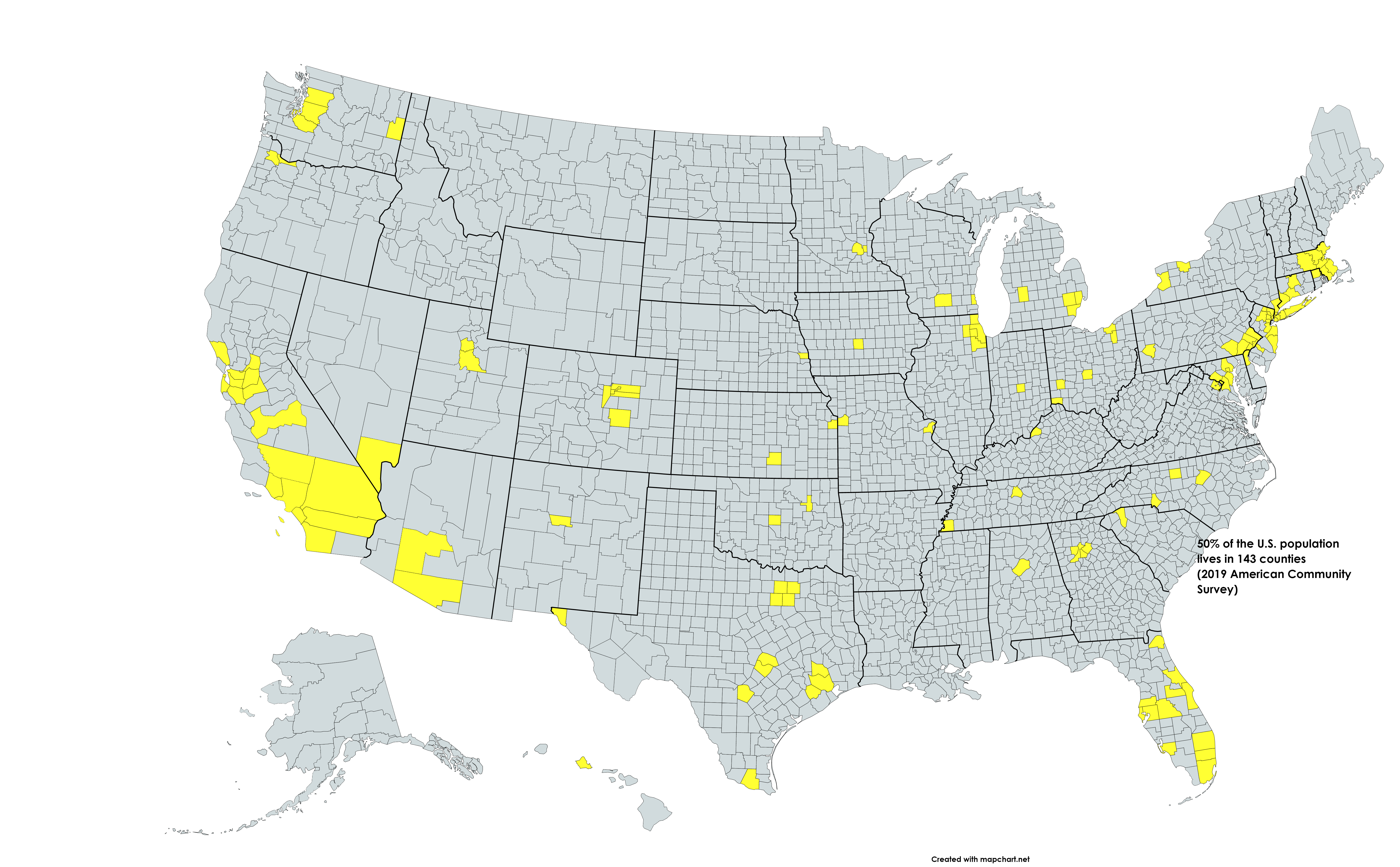
In 2019, half the U.S. population lived in 143 urban / suburban counties, out of 3,143 counties or county equivalents

For many years early in the nation's history, up until the Jacksonian Era (1830s), many states appointed their electors by a vote of the state legislature, and proponents argue that, in the end, the election of the president must still come down to the decisions of each state, or the federal nature of the United States will give way to a single massive, centralized government, to the detriment of the States.

In his 2007 book A More Perfect Constitution, Professor Larry Sabato preferred allocating the electoral college (and Senate seats) in stricter proportion to population while keeping the Electoral College for the benefit of lightly populated swing states and to strengthen the role of the states in federalism.

Willamette University College of Law professor Norman R. Williams has argued that the Constitutional Convention delegates chose the Electoral College to choose the president largely in reaction to the experience during the Confederation period where state governors were often chosen by state legislatures and wanting the new federal government to have an executive branch that was effectively independent of the legislative branch. For example, Alexander Hamilton argued that the Electoral College would prevent sinister bias, foreign interference and domestic intrigue in presidential elections by not permitting members of Congress or any other officer of the United States to serve as electors.

== Efforts to abolish or reform ==
Over 1,000 constitutional amendments have been introduced to change the Electoral College. Since 1800, over 700 proposals to reform or eliminate the system have been introduced in Congress. Proponents of these proposals argued that the electoral college system does not provide for direct democratic election, affords less-populous states an advantage, and allows a candidate to win the presidency without winning the most votes. With the exception of the Twelfth Amendment and the Twenty-third Amendment, none of these proposals has received the approval of two thirds of Congress and three fourths of the states required to amend the Constitution. Ziblatt and Levitsky argue that America has by far the most difficult constitution to amend, which is why reform efforts have stalled in America. In addition to constitutional barriers, public debate over reform has increasingly focused on how the Electoral College affects political equality and representation across states.

=== 1969–1970: Bayh–Celler amendment ===
The closest the United States has come to abolishing the Electoral College occurred during the 91st Congress (1969–1971). The 1968 election resulted in Richard Nixon receiving 301 electoral votes (56% of electors), Hubert Humphrey 191 (35.5%), and George Wallace 46 (8.5%) with 13.5% of the popular vote. However, Nixon had received only 511,944 more popular votes than Humphrey, 43.5% to 42.9%, less than 1% of the national total.

Representative Emanuel Celler (D–New York), chairman of the House Judiciary Committee, responded to public concerns over the disparity between the popular vote and electoral vote by introducing House Joint Resolution 681, a proposed Constitutional amendment that would have replaced the Electoral College with a simpler plurality system based on the national popular vote. With this system, the pair of candidates (running for president and vice-president) who had received the highest number of votes would win the presidency and vice presidency provided they won at least 40% of the national popular vote. If no pair received 40% of the popular vote, a runoff election would be held in which the choice of president and vice president would be made from the two pairs of persons who had received the highest number of votes in the first election.

On April 29, 1969, the House Judiciary Committee voted 28 to 6 to approve the proposal. Debate on the proposal before the full House of Representatives ended on September 11, 1969 and was eventually passed with bipartisan support on September 18, 1969, by a vote of 339 to 70.

On September 30, 1969, President Nixon gave his endorsement for adoption of the proposal, encouraging the Senate to pass its version of the proposal, which had been sponsored as Senate Joint Resolution 1 by Senator Birch Bayh (D–Indiana).

On October 8, 1969, the New York Times reported that 30 state legislatures were "either certain or likely to approve a constitutional amendment embodying the direct election plan if it passes its final Congressional test in the Senate." Ratification of 38 state legislatures would have been needed for adoption. The paper also reported that six other states had yet to state a preference, six were leaning toward opposition, and eight were solidly opposed.

On August 14, 1970, the Senate Judiciary Committee sent its report advocating passage of the proposal to the full Senate. The Judiciary Committee had approved the proposal by a vote of 11 to 6. The six members who opposed the plan, Democratic senators James Eastland of Mississippi, John Little McClellan of Arkansas, and Sam Ervin of North Carolina, along with Republican senators Roman Hruska of Nebraska, Hiram Fong of Hawaii, and Strom Thurmond of South Carolina, all argued that although the present system had potential loopholes, it had worked well throughout the years. Senator Bayh indicated that supporters of the measure were about a dozen votes shy from the 67 needed for the proposal to pass the full Senate. He called upon President Nixon to attempt to persuade undecided Republican senators to support the proposal. However, Nixon, while not reneging on his previous endorsement, chose not to make any further personal appeals to back the proposal.

On September 8, 1970, the Senate commenced openly debating the proposal, and the proposal was quickly filibustered. The lead objectors to the proposal were mostly Southern senators and conservatives from small states, both Democrats and Republicans, who argued that abolishing the Electoral College would reduce their states' political influence. On September 17, 1970, a motion for cloture, which would have ended the filibuster, received 54 votes to 36 for cloture, failing to receive the then-required two-thirds majority of senators voting. A second motion for cloture on September 29, 1970, also failed, by 53 to 34. Thereafter, the Senate majority leader, Mike Mansfield of Montana, moved to lay the proposal aside so the Senate could attend to other business. However, the proposal was never considered again and died when the 91st Congress ended on January 3, 1971.

=== Carter proposal ===
On March 22, 1977, President Jimmy Carter wrote a letter of reform to Congress that also included his expression of abolishing the Electoral College. The letter read in part:

My fourth recommendation is that the Congress adopt a Constitutional amendment to provide for direct popular election of the President. Such an amendment, which would abolish the Electoral College, will ensure that the candidate chosen by the voters actually becomes president. Under the Electoral College, it is always possible that the winner of the popular vote will not be elected. This has already happened in three elections, 1824, 1876, and 1888. In the last election, the result could have been changed by a small shift of votes in Ohio and Hawaii, despite a popular vote difference of 1.7 million. I do not recommend a Constitutional amendment lightly. I think the amendment process must be reserved for an issue of overriding governmental significance. But the method by which we elect our President is such an issue. I will not be proposing a specific direct election amendment. I prefer to allow the Congress to proceed with its work without the interruption of a new proposal.

President Carter's proposed reform of the Electoral College was part of the widest reaching political reform bill proposed by a modern president during this time, and in some aspects of the package, it went beyond original expectations. Newspapers like The New York Times saw President Carter's proposal at that time as "a modest surprise" because of the indication of Carter that he would be interested in only eliminating the electors but retaining the electoral vote system in a modified form.

Newspaper reaction to Carter's proposal ranged from some editorials praising the proposal to other editorials, like that in the Chicago Tribune, criticizing the president for proposing the end of the Electoral College.

In a letter to The New York Times, Representative Jonathan B. Bingham (D-New York) highlighted the danger of the "flawed, outdated mechanism of the Electoral College" by underscoring how a shift of fewer than 10,000 votes in two key states would have led to President Gerald Ford winning the 1976 election despite Jimmy Carter's nationwide 1.7 million-vote margin.

=== Recent proposals to abolish ===
Since January 3, 2019, joint resolutions have been made proposing constitutional amendments that would replace the Electoral College with the popular election of the president and vice president. Unlike the Bayh–Celler amendment, with its 40% threshold for election, these proposals do not require a candidate to achieve a certain percentage of votes to be elected. Contemporary reform proposals are often discussed alongside research showing that the winner-take-all structure of the Electoral college concentrates campaign activity in a small number of competitive states, while voters in noncompetitive states receive comparatively little attention from presidential campaigns.

=== National Popular Vote Interstate Compact ===
As of April 2026, eighteen states plus the District of Columbia have joined the National Popular Vote Interstate Compact. Those joining the compact will, acting together if and when reflecting a majority of electors (at least 270), pledge their electors to the winner of the national popular vote. The compact applies Article II, Section 1, Clause 2 of the Constitution, which gives each state legislature the plenary power to determine how it chooses electors.

Some scholars have suggested that Article I, Section 10, Clause 3 of the Constitution requires congressional consent before the compact could be enforceable; thus, any attempted implementation of the compact without congressional consent could face court challenges to its constitutionality. Others have suggested that the compact's legality was strengthened by Chiafalo v. Washington, in which the Supreme Court upheld the power of states to enforce electors' pledges. While critics have argued that it weakens minority state representation and logistically would make mechanisms like recounts much more difficult.

The nineteen adherents of the compact have 222 electors, which is 82% of the 270 required for it to take effect, or be considered justiciable. Support for alternatives such as the National Popular Vote Interstate Compact has grown alongside polling data showing sustained public support for replacing the Electoral College with a national popular vote.

=== Litigation based on the 14th amendment ===
It has been argued by the advocacy group Equal Citizens that the Equal Protection Clause of the Fourteenth Amendment to the United States Constitution bars the winner-takes-all apportionment of electors by the states. According to this argument, the votes of the losing party are discarded entirely, thereby leading to an unequal position between different voters in the same state. Lawsuits have been filed to this end in California, Massachusetts, Texas and South Carolina, though all have been unsuccessful.

== See also ==
- United States presidential election
- Democratic backsliding in the United States
- List of U.S. states and territories by population
- List of United States presidential elections by Electoral College margin
- Lists of United States presidential electors (2000, 2004, 2008, 2012, 2016, 2020, 2024)
- Trump fake electors plot – 2020 U.S. Republican election fraud scheme
- Voter turnout in United States presidential elections – Aspect of election history
- List of United States presidential elections where the winner lost the popular vote

== Works cited ==
- Beeman, Richard (2010). Plain, Honest Men: The Making of the American Constitution. Random House. ISBN 9780812976847.
- Neale, Thomas H. (October 9, 2020). Presidential Elections: Vacancies in Major-Party Candidacies and the Position of President-Elect (Report). Congressional Research Service.
- Neale, Thomas H. (July 14, 2020). Presidential Succession: Perspectives and Contemporary Issues for Congress (Report). Congressional Research Service.
- Preserving Our Institutions: The Continuity of the Presidency (PDF) (Report). Continuity of Government Commission. June 2009.
- Rossiter, Clinton, ed. (2003). The Federalist Papers. Signet Classics. ISBN 9780451528810.
- Rybicki, Elizabeth; Whitaker, L. Paige (December 8, 2020). Counting Electoral Votes: An Overview of Procedures at the Joint Session, Including Objections by Members of Congress (Report). Congressional Research Service.
- "Third Session of the 42nd Congress". United States Senate Journal. 68. Library of Congress: 334–346. February 12, 1873.
