= McPherson v. Blacker =

- Supreme Court of the United States

Argued October 11, 1892 Decided October 17, 1892
- Full case name: McPherson v. Blacker
- Citations: 146 U.S. 1 (more) 13 S. Ct. 3; 36 L. Ed. 869

Holding
- The Fourteenth Amendment to the United States Constitution does not require state legislatures to appoint their electors in the Electoral College on the basis of the popular vote. State legislatures have "plenary" power to allocate their electors however they want.

Court membership
- Chief Justice Melville Fuller Associate Justices Stephen J. Field · John M. Harlan; Horace Gray · Samuel Blatchford; Lucius Q. C. Lamar II · David J. Brewer; Henry B. Brown · George Shiras Jr.

Case opinion
- Majority: Fuller, joined by unanimous

Laws applied
- U.S. Const. art. II, § 1, cl. 2 U.S. Const. amend. XIV

McPherson v. Blacker, 146 U.S. 1 (1892), was a United States Supreme Court case decided on October 17, 1892. The case concerned a law passed in Michigan which divided the state into separate congressional districts and awarded one of the state's electoral votes to the winner of each district. The suit was filed by several of these electors chosen in the 1892 election, including William McPherson, against Robert R. Blacker, the Secretary of State of Michigan. It was the first Supreme Court case to consider whether certain methods of states' appointments of their electors were constitutional. The Court, in a majority opinion authored by Chief Justice Melville Fuller, upheld Michigan's law, and more generally gave state legislatures plenary power over how they appointed their electors. The Court held that Article Two of the United States Constitution also constrains the ability of each state to limit the ability of its state legislators to decide how to appoint their electors.

== Impact in 2020 post-election legal disputes ==
The plenary power of State legislatures to appoint electors, as affirmed in McPherson, and as originally given in Article 2 of the U.S. Constitution, was suggested as a means to settle the 2020 presidential election. This power, it was also argued, has usually been delegated to the people's vote, but the power can be recovered if the existence of fraud can be proven and/or if the legislatures' election statutes have been violated or circumvented, rendering the election illegal.

On December 11, 2020, the Supreme Court denied the state of Texas's motion to file a bill of complaint against four states, Pennsylvania, Michigan, Wisconsin, and Georgia, that had awarded their electoral votes to President-elect Joe Biden.

On December 5, Republican Speaker of the Arizona House of Representatives Rusty Bowers pointed out, "it is true that the Arizona Legislature could alter the method of appointing electors prospectively. But it cannot undo the election of electors whom the voters already voted for ... the law does not authorize the Legislature to reverse the results of an election ... I cannot and will not entertain a suggestion that we violate current law to change the outcome of a certified election." The Commonwealth of Pennsylvania said in response to the Texas suit:

Nothing in the Electors Clause permits a state legislature to enact a law "in defiance of provisions of [its] State's constitution." ... When this Court said that state legislatures "possess[] plenary authority," it was referring to a legislature's authority to choose a particular "manner" for selecting presidential electors: "by joint ballot," or by "concurrence of the two houses," or by "popular vote," whether by "general ticket" or by congressional "districts." McPherson v. Blacker, 146 U.S. 1, 25 (1892). As the Court has made clear, "[t]he legislative power is the supreme authority, except as limited by the constitution of the state." ... Taking a quote from McPherson out of context, Texas suggests that this plenary power permits a state legislature to nullify the will of the electorate and select its own electors ... There is no support in McPherson for such an extraordinarily antidemocratic proposition.
