= Federalist No. 68 =

Federalist Paper by Alexander Hamilton

- Alexander Hamilton, likely author of Federalist No. 68
- Author: Alexander Hamilton
- Original title: The Mode of Electing the President
- Language: English
- Publisher: The Independent Journal, New York Packet, The Daily Advertiser
- Publication date: March 12, 1788
- Publication place: United States
- Media type: Newspaper
- Preceded by: Federalist No. 67
- Followed by: Federalist No. 69

Federalist No. 68 is the 68th essay of The Federalist Papers, and was published on March 12, 1788. It was probably written by Alexander Hamilton under the pseudonym "Publius", the name under which all of the Federalist Papers were published. Since all of them were written under this pseudonym, who wrote what cannot be verified with certainty. Titled "The Mode of Electing the President", No. 68 describes a perspective on the process selecting the chief executive of the United States. In this essay, the author sought to convince the people of New York of the merits of the proposed constitution. Number 68 is the second in a series of 11 essays discussing the powers and limitations of the executive branch and the only one to describe the method of selecting the president.

== Background ==
=== Constitutional debates ===
Throughout its proceedings, the US Constitutional Convention of 1787 debated the method for selecting the president, trying to find a manner that would be acceptable to all the bodies represented at the convention.

Different plans were proposed, including:

- "The Virginia Plan", proposed by Governor Edmund Randolph of Virginia (or possibly James Madison), called for the selection of the Executive by the National Legislature
- Elbridge Gerry proposed selection by the state executives (i.e., governors)
- The New Jersey plan was similar to the Randolph/Virginia plan but called instead for the possibility of a plural executive.
- Alexander Hamilton initially supported a lifetime appointment for an executive, in addition to one branch of the legislature potentially doing the same.

=== Interests of slave-holding states ===
The interests of slave-holding states may have influenced the choice of the Electoral College as the mode of electing the president. James Wilson proposed the use of a direct election by the people, but he gained no support for this idea, and it was decided that Congress would elect the president. When the entire draft of the Constitution was considered, Gouverneur Morris brought the debate back up and decided he wanted the people to choose the president. James Madison agreed that election by "the people at large was in his opinion the fittest" way to go about electing the president, but he knew that the less populous slave states would not be influential under such a system, so he backed the Electoral College. Another factor here was the so-called Three-Fifths Compromise, which gave added power to the slave-holding states under the Electoral College, which they would not have had under any likely form of popular vote.

== Federalist No. 68 outlined ==
=== Hamilton's understanding of the Electoral College ===
Federalist No. 68 is the continuation of Alexander Hamilton's analysis of the presidency, in this case concerning the method of electing the president. Hamilton argues the advantages of the indirect electoral process described in Article II Section 1 of the Constitution. However, in the case of a tied vote in the Electoral College, the U.S. House of Representatives was to make the choice.

Hamilton viewed the system as superior to direct popular election. First, he recognized the "sense of the people should operate in the choice" and believed it would through the election of the electors to the Electoral College. Second, the electors would be:

...men most capable of analyzing the qualities adapted to the station and acting under circumstances favorable to deliberation, and to a judicious combination of all the reasons and inducements which were proper to govern their choice.

Such men would be "most likely to have the information and discernment" to make a good choice and to avoid the election of anyone "not in an eminent degree endowed with the requisite qualifications."

Corruption of an electoral process could most likely arise from the desire of "foreign powers to gain an improper ascendant in our councils." To minimize the risk of foreign machinations and inducements, the electoral college members would have only a "transient existence", and no elector could be a "senator, representative, or other person holding a place of trust or profit under the United States"; electors would make their choice in a "detached situation", whereas a preexisting body of federal office-holders "might be tampered with beforehand to prostitute their votes".

Also, a successful candidate for the office of president would have to have the outstanding qualities to appeal to electors from many states, not just one or a few states:

Talents for low intrigue, and the little arts of popularity, may alone suffice to elevate a man to the first honors in a single State; but it will require other talents, and a different kind of merit, to establish him in the esteem and confidence of the whole Union, or of so considerable a portion of it as would be necessary to make him a successful candidate for the distinguished office of President of the United States.

Hamilton expressed confidence that:

It will not be too strong to say, that there will be a constant probability of seeing the station filled by characters pre-eminent for ability and virtue.

=== Rules on the Electors ===
Hamilton lists specific rules for the electors, which include:

- The electors meet within their states to select the president
- No individuals who have "too great devotion of the President in office"
- Individuals currently holding elected positions within the government may not serve as electors.

=== Selection of the Vice-President ===
Hamilton notes that the selection of the vice president should follow the same form as that of the president, through selection by the Electoral College. However, the Senate is to deal with the voting in the case of an Electoral College tie. Hamilton also answers criticism that the Senate should have been given the power to select the vice president instead of the Electoral College. Hamilton notes that there are two primary arguments against that point: first, that the vice president's power as President of the Senate would mean that the tiebreaker of the Senate would be beholden to the Senate for his power and, therefore, would be unable to make the necessary decisions as a tiebreaker without fear of removal or reprisal; second, that the possibility of the vice president becoming president means that the people and the Electoral College should elect this individual because all of the powers vested in the president could fall into the hands of the vice president.

=== Works referenced in Federalist No. 68 ===
- "The most plausible of these, who appear in print", references the work of the Federal Farmer (likely Richard Henry Lee). On the Electoral College, the Federal Farmer accepts the concept of the Electoral College, finding that "The election of this officer (the vice president), as well as of the President of the United States seems to be properly secured."
- The passage, "For forms of government let fools contest, That which is best administered is best," is a paraphrase of Alexander Pope's An Essay On Man (Chapter 4, Epistle 3, section VI), which Hamilton uses to talk about the presidential election process as a model for producing good administration. In Pope, "That which" is replaced by "Whatever".

== Reactions to Federalist No. 68 ==
=== The Anti-Federalist Papers ===
In Anti-Federalist Papers 72, the anonymous Democratic-Republican Party writer argues that the issues with the Electoral College deal with the ability of electors, rather than the people, to elect the president. In his eyes, the Electoral College removes the power of the people to select their leader and instead delegates that right to a small number of individuals.

The writer further speculates, "Is it not probable, at least possible, that the president who is to be vested with all this demiomnipotence—who is not chosen by the community; and who consequently, as to them, is irresponsible and independent—that he, I say, by a few artful and dependent emissaries in Congress, may not only perpetuate his own personal administration but also make it hereditary?" Early Democratic-Republican's fears are of a hypothetically stronger executive whom he compared to Britain's George III.

=== Cato No. 4 ===
Hamilton also defends against the claims made in Cato No. 4, which claimed that "The establishment of a vice-president is as unnecessary as it is dangerous [for them to preside in the senate]". Madison gave two reasons for the vice president to be the Senate's presiding officer. First, since he only has one vote, he is equal to his substituents. Also, should the president die, the vice president will know the concerns of Congress and the president and be better prepared than anyone else to take the position.

=== Political parties ===
Hamilton, James Madison and the other designers of the electoral college never expected the emergence of organized political parties who would choose their candidates in competition with each other. By 1796, the Federalists and Republicans were rapidly being organized—with leadership provided by Hamilton and Madison—making the electoral college a minor adjunct of little importance. A flaw was discovered in 1800 when Thomas Jefferson and Aaron Burr got the same number of electoral votes, although Jefferson was the intended candidate. That flaw was soon fixed by a 12th Amendment to the US Constitution.

== Notes ==
1. Madison. June 13, 1787. p. 115 in Ohio U. Press edition
2. Madison. June 9, 1787. p. 93
3. Madison. June 18, 1787. p. 136
4. The following works referenced came from Charles Kesler's notes in Rossiter, Clinton ed. The Federalist Papers. Signet Classic. 2003. p. 622-623.
5. Storing (2.8.29)
6. from Anti-Federalist 72
