= Cook v. Hart =

- Supreme Court of the United States

Decided November 21, 1892
- Full case name: Cook v. Hart
- Citations: 146 U.S. 183 (more)

Holding
- The Extradition Clause allows a state to kidnap a fugitive residing in another state and forcibly return them to a state for a valid trial.

Court membership
- Chief Justice Melville Fuller Associate Justices Stephen J. Field · John M. Harlan; Horace Gray · Samuel Blatchford; Lucius Q. C. Lamar II · David J. Brewer; Henry B. Brown · George Shiras Jr.

Case opinion
- Majority: Brown, joined by unanimous

Laws applied
- Extradition Clause

Cook v. Hart, 146 U.S. 183 (1892), was a United States Supreme Court case in which the Court held the Extradition Clause allows a state to kidnap a fugitive residing in another state and forcibly return them to a state for a valid trial.
