= List of United States Supreme Court cases, volume 146 =

Supreme Court of the United States
- Interactive map of Supreme Court of the United States
- 38°53′26″N 77°00′16″W
- Established: March 4, 1789; 237 years ago
- Location: Washington, D.C.
- Coordinates: 38°53′26″N 77°00′16″W
- Composition method: Presidential nomination with Senate confirmation
- Authorised by: Constitution of the United States, Art. III, § 1
- Judge term length: life tenure, subject to impeachment and removal
- Number of positions: 9 (by statute)
- Website: supremecourt.gov

This is a list of cases reported in volume 146 of United States Reports, decided by the Supreme Court of the United States in 1892.

== Justices of the Supreme Court at the time of volume 146 U.S. ==
The Supreme Court is established by Article III, Section 1 of the Constitution of the United States, which says: "The judicial Power of the United States, shall be vested in one supreme Court . . .". The size of the Court is not specified; the Constitution leaves it to Congress to set the number of justices. Under the Judiciary Act of 1789 Congress originally fixed the number of justices at six (one chief justice and five associate justices). Since 1789 Congress has varied the size of the Court from six to seven, nine, ten, and back to nine justices (always including one chief justice).

When the cases in volume 146 U.S. were decided the Court comprised the following nine members:

Portrait	Justice	Office	Home State	Succeeded	Date confirmed by the Senate (Vote)	Tenure on Supreme Court
	Melville Fuller	Chief Justice	Illinois	Morrison Waite	July 20, 1888 (41–20)	October 8, 1888 – July 4, 1910 (Died)
	Stephen Johnson Field	Associate Justice	California	newly created seat	March 10, 1863 (Acclamation)	May 10, 1863 – December 1, 1897 (Retired)
	John Marshall Harlan	Associate Justice	Kentucky	David Davis	November 29, 1877 (Acclamation)	December 10, 1877 – October 14, 1911 (Died)
	Horace Gray	Associate Justice	Massachusetts	Nathan Clifford	December 20, 1881 (51–5)	January 9, 1882 – September 15, 1902 (Died)
	Samuel Blatchford	Associate Justice	New York	Ward Hunt	March 22, 1882 (Acclamation)	April 3, 1882 – July 7, 1893 (Died)
	Lucius Quintus Cincinnatus Lamar	Associate Justice	Mississippi	William Burnham Woods	January 16, 1888 (32–28)	January 18, 1888 – January 23, 1893 (Died)
	David Josiah Brewer	Associate Justice	Kansas	Stanley Matthews	December 18, 1889 (53–11)	January 6, 1890 – March 28, 1910 (Died)
	Henry Billings Brown	Associate Justice	Michigan	Samuel Freeman Miller	December 29, 1890 (Acclamation)	January 5, 1891 – May 28, 1906 (Retired)
	George Shiras Jr.	Associate Justice	Pennsylvania	Joseph P. Bradley	July 26, 1892 (Acclamation)	October 10, 1892 – February 23, 1903 (Retired)

== Notable Case in 146 U.S. ==
=== McPherson v. Blacker ===
McPherson v. Blacker, 146 U.S. 1 (1892), concerned a law passed in Michigan which divided the state into separate congressional districts and awarded one of the state's electoral votes to the winner of each district. The suit was filed by several of these electors chosen in the 1892 election, including William McPherson, against Robert R. Blacker, the Secretary of State of Michigan. It was the first Supreme Court case to consider whether certain methods of states' appointments of their electors were constitutional. The Court, in a majority opinion authored by Chief Justice Melville Fuller, upheld Michigan's law, and more generally gave state legislatures plenary power over how they appointed their electors.

== Citation style ==
Under the Judiciary Act of 1789 the federal court structure at the time comprised District Courts, which had general trial jurisdiction; Circuit Courts, which had mixed trial and appellate (from the US District Courts) jurisdiction; and the United States Supreme Court, which had appellate jurisdiction over the federal District and Circuit courts—and for certain issues over state courts. The Supreme Court also had limited original jurisdiction (i.e., in which cases could be filed directly with the Supreme Court without first having been heard by a lower federal or state court). There were one or more federal District Courts and/or Circuit Courts in each state, territory, or other geographical region.

The Judiciary Act of 1891 created the United States Courts of Appeals and reassigned the jurisdiction of most routine appeals from the district and circuit courts to these appellate courts. The Act created nine new courts that were originally known as the "United States Circuit Courts of Appeals." The new courts had jurisdiction over most appeals of lower court decisions. The Supreme Court could review either legal issues that a court of appeals certified or decisions of court of appeals by writ of certiorari.

Bluebook citation style is used for case names, citations, and jurisdictions.

- "# Cir." = United States Court of Appeals
  - e.g., "3d Cir." = United States Court of Appeals for the Third Circuit
- "C.C.D." = United States Circuit Court for the District of . . .
  - e.g.,"C.C.D.N.J." = United States Circuit Court for the District of New Jersey
- "D." = United States District Court for the District of . . .
  - e.g.,"D. Mass." = United States District Court for the District of Massachusetts
- "E." = Eastern; "M." = Middle; "N." = Northern; "S." = Southern; "W." = Western
  - e.g.,"C.C.S.D.N.Y." = United States Circuit Court for the Southern District of New York
  - e.g.,"M.D. Ala." = United States District Court for the Middle District of Alabama
- "Ct. Cl." = United States Court of Claims
- The abbreviation of a state's name alone indicates the highest appellate court in that state's judiciary at the time.
  - e.g.,"Pa." = Supreme Court of Pennsylvania
  - e.g.,"Me." = Supreme Judicial Court of Maine

== List of cases in volume 146 U.S. ==
Case Name	Page and year	Opinion of the Court	Concurring opinion(s)	Dissenting opinion(s)	Lower Court	Disposition
McPherson v. Blacker	1 (1892)	Fuller	none	none	Mich.	affirmed
Van Winkle v. Crowell	42 (1892)	Blatchford	none	none	C.C.M.D. Ala.	affirmed
Cincinnati Safe and Lock Company v. Grand Rapids Safety Deposit Company	54 (1892)	Fuller	none	none	C.C.S.D. Ohio	dismissed
Hubbard v. Soby	56 (1892)	Fuller	none	none	C.C.D. Conn.	dismissed
Earnshaw v. United States	60 (1892)	Brown	none	none	C.C.E.D. Pa.	affirmed
United States v. Perry	71 (1892)	Brown	none	none	C.C.S.D.N.Y.	reversed
United States v. Schoverling	76 (1892)	Blatchford	none	none	C.C.S.D.N.Y.	affirmed
Cross v. Burke	82 (1892)	Fuller	none	none	Sup. Ct. D.C.	dismissed
Foster v. Mansfield, Coldwater and Lake Michigan Railroad Company	88 (1892)	Brown	none	none	C.C.N.D. Ohio	affirmed
Ware v. Galveston City Company	102 (1892)	Blatchford	none	none	C.C.E.D. Tex.	affirmed
City of Bellaire v. Baltimore and Ohio Railroad Company	117 (1892)	Gray	none	none	C.C.S.D. Ohio	reversed
San Pedro and Canyon del Agua Company v. United States	120 (1892)	Brewer	none	none	Sup. Ct. Terr. N.M.	affirmed
Mattox v. United States	140 (1892)	Fuller	none	none	D. Kan.	reversed
Roby v. Colehour	153 (1892)	Harlan	none	none	Ill.	affirmed
Morley v. Lake Shore and Michigan Southern Railway Company	162 (1892)	Shiras	none	Harlan	N.Y.	affirmed
Hardee v. Wilson	179 (1892)	Shiras	none	none	C.C.S.D. Ga.	dismissed
Cook v. Hart	183 (1892)	Brown	none	none	C.C.E.D. Wis.	affirmed
Stotesbury v. United States	196 (1892)	Brewer	none	none	Ct. Cl.	affirmed
Southern Pacific Railroad Company v. Denton	202 (1892)	Gray	none	none	C.C.W.D. Tex.	reversed
Root v. Third Avenue Railway Company	210 (1892)	Blatchford	none	none	C.C.S.D.N.Y.	affirmed
Washington and Georgetown Railroad Company v. District of Columbia	227 (1892)	Fuller	none	none	Sup. Ct. D.C.	dismissed
Junge v. Hedden	233 (1892)	Fuller	none	none	C.C.S.D.N.Y.	affirmed
Thompson v. St. Nicholas National Bank	240 (1892)	Blatchford	none	none	N.Y.	affirmed
Toplitz v. Hedden	252 (1892)	Blatchford	none	none	C.C.S.D.N.Y.	affirmed
Hamilton Gaslight and Coke Company v. City of Hamilton	258 (1892)	Harlan	none	none	C.C.S.D. Ohio	affirmed
In Re Cross	271 (1892)	Fuller	none	none	Sup. Ct. D.C.	habeas corpus denied
Wilmington and Weldon Railroad Company v. Alsbrook	279 (1892)	Fuller	none	none	N.C.	affirmed
Butler v. Goreley	303 (1892)	Blatchford	none	none	Mass. Super. Ct.	affirmed
Hallinger v. Davis	314 (1892)	Shiras	none	none	C.C.D.N.J.	affirmed
Benson v. United States	325 (1892)	Brewer	none	none	C.C.D. Kan.	affirmed
United States v. Dunnington	338 (1892)	Brown	none	none	Ct. Cl.	reversed
Chicago and Northwestern Railway Company v. Osborne	354 (1892)	Fuller	none	none	8th Cir.	certiorari denied
Joy v. Adelbert College	355 (1892)	Fuller	none	none	C.C.N.D. Ohio	dismissed
In re Engles	357 (1892)	Fuller	none	none	E.D.N.Y.	prohibition denied
McMullen v. United States	360 (1892)	Harlan	none	none	Ct. Cl.	affirmed
Balloch v. Hooper	363 (1892)	Harlan	none	none	Sup. Ct. D.C.	affirmed
Lewis v. United States	370 (1892)	Shiras	none	Brewer	C.C.W.D. Ark.	reversed
Illinois Central Railroad Company v. Illinois	387 (1892)	Field	none	Shiras	C.C.N.D. Ill.	affirmed as modified
Derby v. Thompson	476 (1892)	Brown	none	none	C.C.D. Mass.	reversed
Compania Bilbaina de Navegacion de Bilbao v. Spanish-American Light and Power Company	483 (1892)	Blatchford	none	none	C.C.S.D.N.Y.	affirmed
Scott v. Armstrong	499 (1892)	Fuller	none	none	C.C.S.D. Ohio	reversed
Mitchell v. New York, Lake Erie and Western Railroad Company	513 (1892)	Fuller	none	none	C.C.S.D.N.Y.	affirmed
Brinkerhoff v. Aloe	515 (1892)	Fuller	none	none	C.C.E.D. Mo.	affirmed
National Tube Works Company v. Vallou	517 (1892)	Blatchford	none	none	C.C.S.D.N.Y.	affirmed
Royer v. Coupe	524 (1892)	Blatchford	none	none	C.C.D. Mass.	affirmed
Cameron v. United States	533 (1892)	Brown	none	none	Sup. Ct. Terr. Ariz.	dismissed
McGourkey v. Toledo and Ohio Central Railway Company	536 (1892)	Brown	none	none	C.C.N.D. Ohio	affirmed
United States v. Southern Pacific Railroad Company	570 (1892)	Brewer	none	Field	C.C.S.D. Cal.	reversed
United States v. Colton Marble and Lime Company	615 (1892)	Brewer	none	Field	C.C.S.D. Cal.	reversed
Brown v. Marion National Bank	619 (1892)	Fuller	none	none	Ky.	dismissed
Means v. Bank of Randall	620 (1892)	Blatchford	none	none	C.C.D. Kan.	affirmed
Lloyd v. Preston	630 (1892)	Shiras	none	none	C.C.S.D. Ohio	affirmed
Yesler v. Washington Harbor Line Commissioners	646 (1892)	Fuller	none	none	Wash.	dismissed
Huntington v. Attrill	657 (1892)	Gray	none	Fuller	Md.	reversed
Potts v. Wallace	689 (1892)	Shiras	none	none	C.C.E.D.N.Y.	reversed
