= Chiafalo v. Washington =

2020 United States Supreme Court case

- Supreme Court of the United States

Argued May 13, 2020 Decided July 6, 2020
- Full case name: Peter B. Chiafalo, Levi Jennet Guerra, and Esther Virginia John, Petitioners v. Washington
- Docket no.: 19-465
- Citations: 591 U.S. 578 (more) 140 S. Ct. 2316

Case history
- Prior: Matter of Guerra, 193 Wash. 2d 380, 441 P.3d 807 (2019); cert. granted, 140 S. Ct. 918 (2020)

Holding
- A State may enforce an elector's pledge to support his party's nominee—and the state voters' choice—for President.

Court membership
- Chief Justice John Roberts Associate Justices Clarence Thomas · Ruth Bader Ginsburg; Stephen Breyer · Samuel Alito; Sonia Sotomayor · Elena Kagan; Neil Gorsuch · Brett Kavanaugh

Case opinions
- Majority: Kagan, joined by Roberts, Ginsburg, Breyer, Alito, Sotomayor, Gorsuch, Kavanaugh
- Concurrence: Thomas (in judgment), joined by Gorsuch (Part II)

Laws applied
- U.S. Const. art. II, § 1, cl. 2

Colorado Department of State v. Baca
- Supreme Court of the United States

Argued May 13, 2020 Decided July 6, 2020
- Full case name: Colorado Department of State, Petitioners v. Micheal Baca, Polly Baca, and Robert Nemanich
- Docket no.: 19-518
- Citations: 591 U.S. 655 (more)

Case history
- Prior: Baca v. Hickenlooper, No. 16-cv-02986 (D. Colo.)

Holding
- Judgment of Tenth Circuit reversed in light of Chiafalo v. Washington.

Court membership
- Chief Justice John Roberts Associate Justices Clarence Thomas · Ruth Bader Ginsburg; Stephen Breyer · Samuel Alito; Sonia Sotomayor · Elena Kagan; Neil Gorsuch · Brett Kavanaugh

Case opinions
- Per curiam
- Concurrence: Thomas (in judgment, did not file an opinion)
- Sotomayor took no part in the consideration or decision of the case.

Laws applied
- U.S. Const. art. II, § 1, cl. 2

Chiafalo v. Washington, 591 U.S. 578 (2020), was a United States Supreme Court case on the issue of "faithless electors" in the Electoral College stemming from the 2016 United States presidential election. The Court ruled unanimously, by a vote of 9–0, that states have the ability to enforce an elector's pledge in presidential elections. Chiafalo deals with electors who received US$1,000 fines for not voting for the nominees of their party in the state of Washington. The case was originally consolidated with Colorado Department of State v. Baca, 591 U.S. ___ (2020), a similar case based on a challenge to a Colorado law providing for the removal and replacement of an elector who does not vote for the presidential candidate who received the most votes in the state, with the electors claiming they have discretion to vote as they choose under the Twelfth Amendment to the United States Constitution. On March 10, 2020, Justice Sonia Sotomayor recused herself in the Colorado case due to a prior relationship to a respondent, and the cases were decided separately on July 6, 2020. Baca was a per curiam decision that followed from the unanimous ruling in Chiafalo against the faithless electors and in favor of the state.

== Background ==
=== Faithless electors ===
In the United States Electoral College, faithless electors are those who either cast electoral votes for someone other than the candidate of the party for whom they pledged to vote or who abstain. Faithless electors are comparatively rare because electors are generally chosen among those who are already personally committed to a party and party's candidate. Thirty-three states plus the District of Columbia have passed laws to prevent faithless electors, but none had been enforced prior to 2016. In 1952, the constitutionality of state pledge laws was brought before the Supreme Court in Ray v. Blair, 343 U.S. 214 (1952). The Court ruled in favor of state laws requiring electors to pledge to vote for the winning candidate in order to be certified as electors, as well as removing electors who refuse to pledge. The Court did not rule whether pledges were enforceable. Nevertheless, the Court also wrote:

However, even if such promises of candidates for the electoral college are legally unenforceable because violative of an assumed constitutional freedom of the elector under the Constitution, Art. II, § 1, to vote as he may choose [emphasis added] in the electoral college, it would not follow that the requirement of a pledge in the primary is unconstitutional.

In his dissent, Justice Robert H. Jackson, joined by Justice William O. Douglas, wrote:

No one faithful to our history can deny that the plan originally contemplated what is implicit in its text – that electors would be free agents, to exercise an independent and nonpartisan judgment as to the men best qualified for the Nation's highest offices.

=== State law ===
For the 2016 election, Washington state law RCW 29A.56.320 required electors, selected by their party, to vote for the candidate of their party during the presidential election, or otherwise be subject to a US$1,000 civil penalty.

Under Colorado law, each presidential elector must vote for the presidential and vice-presidential candidates who received the highest number of votes in Colorado's general election.

== Case history ==
In the 2016 presidential election, the major-party nominees were Hillary Clinton and her running mate Tim Kaine for the Democrats, and Donald Trump and his running mate Mike Pence for the Republicans. Trump eventually won the election with 304 electoral votes to become the 45th President of the United States. There was a grassroots effort to convince electors to vote their conscience in accordance with Alexander Hamilton's Federalist Paper No. 68 to try to sway electors to vote for an alternative Republican candidate, even if this were to violate their pledges, to deny Trump a majority in the electoral college and trigger a contingent election in the United States House of Representatives. While the defection of at least 37 Republican electors was needed to force a contingent election, there were only 2 who did not vote for Donald Trump; most of the faithless votes came from Democratic electors, several of whom also voted for alternative Republican candidates.

=== Washington ===
The Democratic ticket of Clinton and Kaine won the popular vote in Washington, thus the slate of twelve Democratic electors were appointed. Four of these electors, who had signed pledges to vote for the Democratic nominee, voted for candidates other than Clinton/Kaine. Per the law, they were each fined. Three of the four electors, Peter Bret Chiafalo, Levi Guerra, and Esther John, challenged the fine as a violation of their constitutional rights, arguing that the state's authority over them as electors ended once they were appointed and they were free to vote as they chose under the Twelfth Amendment to the United States Constitution. At an initial hearing, an administrative law judge upheld the fines, stating he had no jurisdiction to rule on constitutional arguments, only whether the fines were applied in accordance with state law. At the first trial at the Thurston County Superior Court in 2017, the judge ruled against the constitutional argument and deemed the fines permissible. The three electors then appealed to the Washington Supreme Court, which in May 2019 upheld the lower court ruling with an 8–1 vote. The majority opinion states that "The power of electors to vote comes from the State, and the elector has no personal right to that vote" to justify the fine. The lone dissent argues that the plenary power of the state to appoint electors may not be conflated with control over the electors once voting has begun, in line with Justice Jackson's concerns in Ray v. Blair.

Subsequently, Washington Gov. Jay Inslee signed a bill into law in May 2019 that changes the faithless elector law, such that should an elector fail to vote for the candidate of their party, the elector is removed from their position and a new elector is then appointed, rather than allowing the elector to vote faithlessly and be subject to fines after the fact. The new law is analogous to the law in question in the Colorado case.

On October 7, 2019, the three electors appealed their case to the United States Supreme Court.

=== Colorado ===
Clinton and Kaine received the most votes in Colorado, a state allotted 9 electoral votes. Two Democratic electors in the 2016 election sought an injunction against the state's law after the results of the general election were tallied in early November 2016 but before the electoral college vote on December 19, 2016. The named plaintiff in the case was former Democratic state senator Polly Baca of Denver, who had indicated she would cast her vote for an alternative Republican candidate. The named defendant was John Hickenlooper, then the Governor of Colorado. They challenged Colorado's law on the basis of their constitutional rights under the Twelfth and Fourteenth Amendments, as well as the Supreme Court's prior ruling in Ray v. Blair that left open whether states can compel electors to vote as specified with penalties. On December 12, 2016, District Judge Wiley Daniel of the United States District Court for the District of Colorado denied the indicative petition, calling the case a "political stunt". Wayne Williams, then the Secretary of State of Colorado, stated that he would replace electors who failed to vote for Hillary Clinton.

The electors' appeal of the decision to the United States Court of Appeals for the Tenth Circuit was denied on December 16, with the court stating the injunction "would undermine the electoral process and unduly prejudice the American people by prohibiting a successful transition of power". The court did not rule on the state's authority to remove an elector after voting, but declared in a footnote that any attempt to remove electors "after voting has begun" would be "unlikely in light of the text of the Twelfth Amendment".

While both electors ultimately voted for Clinton during the electoral college vote on December 19, a different elector, Micheal Baca (no relation to Polly), attempted to vote for John Kasich. Before voting for vice president, Williams declared his vote invalid under state law and replaced him with an alternate elector who voted for Clinton and Tim Kaine.

Micheal Baca and the two other electors then filed suit in a new case, Nemanich v. Williams, claiming "The Constitution does not expressly or implicitly give the states any power to restrict Electors' freedom beyond the 12th Amendment's single limitation." Later, the respondent was changed to the Colorado Department of State. On April 10, 2018, Judge Daniel granted the motion to dismiss the case on behalf of Colorado. The electors appealed to the Tenth Circuit, with oral arguments held in January 2019. Both sides filed a joint motion seeking the court to render a decision on the merits of the case, with Colorado claiming to waive immunity from suit. The court ruled in favor of the electors in a 2–1 vote in August 2019, agreeing that Baca's removal as an elector violated the Twelfth Amendment. The majority opinion, written by Circuit Judge Carolyn Baldwin McHugh and joined by Circuit Judge Jerome Holmes, stated that "The text of the Constitution makes clear that states do not have the constitutional authority to interfere with presidential electors who exercise their constitutional right to vote for the President and Vice President candidates of their choice." Circuit Judge Mary Beck Briscoe did not take a position on the merits of the case but dissented on mootness and standing grounds. The court did rule that only Micheal Baca had standing and officially remanded the case back to the district court. The ruling immediately invalidated faithless elector laws in states within the 10th Circuit, specifically in New Mexico, Oklahoma, and Wyoming.

Instead of seeking an en banc review at the Tenth Circuit, Colorado filed a petition for writ of certiorari to the Supreme Court on October 16, 2019. Colorado's petition identified the circuit split between the Tenth Circuit's decision and that of the Washington Supreme Court in Chiafalo, seeking the Supreme Court's involvement to resolve the split. Colorado's petition urged for an urgent resolution to the case, as the matter may impact the 2020 election.

== Supreme Court ==
On January 17, 2020, the Supreme Court agreed to hear both the Washington case and the Colorado case, Colorado Department of State v. Baca, 19-518, as a consolidated case, with Chiafalo v. Washington the lead case. Oral arguments were originally scheduled for April 28, 2020. However, on March 10, Justice Sonia Sotomayor announced that she would recuse herself from the Colorado case, citing her prior friendship with the respondent Polly Baca. As a separate result, the Supreme Court reversed the consolidation of the two cases in a decision that Sotomayor had no part in due to her connection to Baca. Oral arguments in both cases were rescheduled to be held via teleconference due to the COVID-19 pandemic, which occurred on May 13, 2020. Observers to the arguments for both cases believed the justices were concerned with the chaos that allowing faithless electors to vote how they wanted, or to be influenced by bribes, would have on the election process. Lawrence Lessig, representing the electors in the Washington case, argued that the Constitution does not give the authority to states to restrict how electors can vote, but several justices stated that the Constitution does not block states from such restrictions. In light of oral arguments, some legal scholars thought that the Court may overly weight the potential negative consequences of the constitutional provisions for electors and allow for their original meaning to be overridden.

The Court issued its rulings in both Chiafalo and Baca on July 6, 2020. Chiafalo was a unanimous ruling of the court, affirming the Washington court's decision that states may enforce the pledge of an elector in the presidential election; Baca was decided per curiam (with Sotomayor recused) reversing the Court of Appeals' judgement "for the reasons stated in Chiafalo..." Justice Elena Kagan wrote the majority opinion which all but Justice Clarence Thomas joined. Kagan wrote "Today, we consider whether a State may also penalize an elector for breaking his pledge and voting for someone other than the presidential candidate who won his State's popular vote. We hold that a State may do so...The Constitution's text and the Nation's history both support allowing a State to enforce an elector's pledge to support his party's nominee — and the state voters' choice — for President." Thomas wrote a concurrence that was partially joined by Justice Neil Gorsuch, adding that "nothing in the Constitution prevents States from requiring Presidential electors to vote for the candidate chosen by the people." In Baca, Thomas concurred in the judgment without an opinion.

== Impact ==
The Supreme Court's decision was highly anticipated with respect to the upcoming 2020 presidential election. Though faithless electors have never changed the outcome of an election, some argue the possibility that faithless votes could affect the outcome in a close election increased in light of the events of 2016. The Court's ruling was widely seen as a welcome outcome in the interest of avoiding potential election chaos, but some also argued that it reaffirmed the need for Electoral College reform.

The electors in both cases were represented by Lawrence Lessig, who founded the group Equal Citizens that is pursuing litigation to seek democratic election reforms and raise awareness. Lessig argued that both cases offered the Supreme Court the opportunity to rule on the matter of faithless elector laws outside the realm of a contested election where their ruling would have a direct impact on the outcome, as in Bush v. Gore. By clarifying how the Electoral College actually functions, Lessig and Equal Citizens hope to spur Electoral College reform either via a constitutional amendment or via the National Popular Vote Interstate Compact. In the latter case, the decision was seen to strengthen the claim that states may choose to appoint electors based on the national popular vote. Others cautioned against reading the case opinion too broadly. After the case was decided, Lessig expressed concern that leaving electors with no rights to challenge state legislatures could allow a legislature to change state law after an election to appoint, by fiat, electors for a losing candidate.

In 2013, Bloomberg Law editor Michael Brody had argued that "the role of electors has yet to be defined by a court," and cited the Supreme Court ruling in Ray v. Blair (1952) as suggesting that the 12th Amendment does not require that electors must vote for the candidate to whom they are pledged. Brody argued that because the NPVIC binds only states and not electors, those electors could retain independent withdrawal power as faithless electors at the request of the compacting states, unless the compacting states adopt penalties or other statutes that bind the electors—which 32 states and the District of Columbia did at the time of the ruling.

Some legal scholars have questioned the Court's reliance on the appointment power of the states under Article II to justify control over electors, noting that similar Constitutional text that gave state legislatures the power to appoint senators (prior to the 17th Amendment) was never understood to include the power to control how they vote, and that removal and replacement of an elector, as in Baca, directly conflicts with the plain meaning of the text of the 12th Amendment, which mandates that once an elector casts a vote, it must be counted and included on a list that is sent to Congress. Other questions have been raised specifically regarding the brief per curiam decision in Baca, such as why Justice Gorsuch did not also join the 10th Amendment discussion by Justice Thomas in his concurring opinion as he did in Chiafalo or how the justices dealt with the mootness and standing questions specific to Baca raised by several justices at oral argument.

== See also ==
- McPherson v. Blacker (1892)
- Ray v. Blair (1952)
