= Super PAC =

Type of US political organization

Independent expenditure-only political action committees, commonly known as super PACs, are a type of political action committees (PACs) in the United States. Unlike traditional PACs, super PACs are legally allowed to fundraise unlimited amounts of money from individuals or organizations for the purpose of campaign advertising; however, they are not permitted to either coordinate with or contribute directly to candidate campaigns or political parties. However, in practice, restrictions on such coordination are considered flimsy and poorly enforced.

Super PACs are subject to the same organizational, reporting, and public disclosure requirements as traditional PACs. Many super PACs are candidate-oriented but some focus on specific issues, an industry, a piece of legislation or a federal administrative rule.

Super PACs were made possible by two judicial decisions in 2010: Citizens United v. Federal Election Commission by the U.S. Supreme Court and, two months later, the federal Court of Appeals for the D.C. Circuit decision in Speechnow.org v. FEC.

== History ==
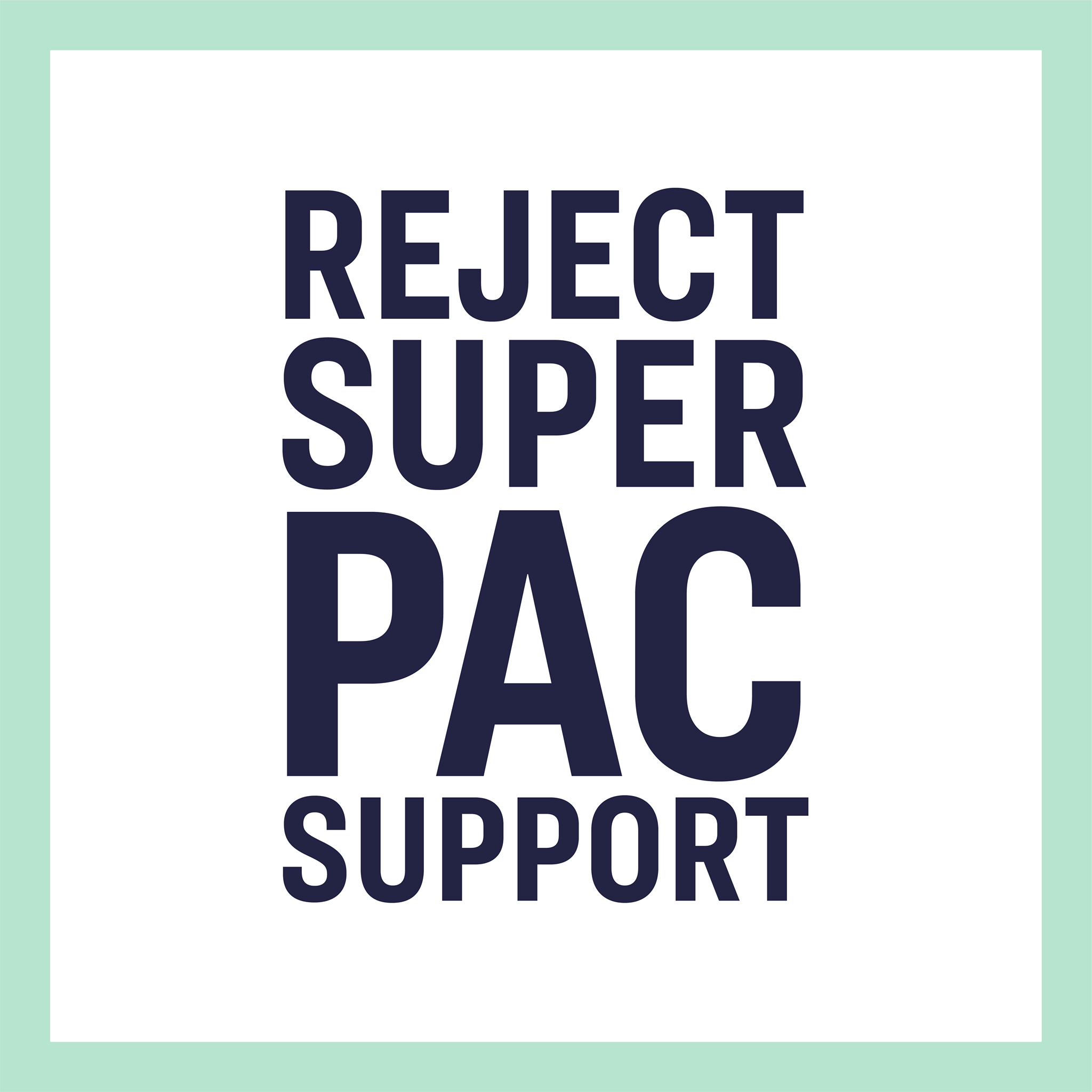
A Facebook post made by Elizabeth Warren during her 2020 presidential campaign criticizing super PACs

Super PACs were made possible by two judicial decisions in 2010: Citizens United v. Federal Election Commission and, two months later, Speechnow.org v. FEC. In Speechnow.org, the federal Court of Appeals for the D.C. Circuit held that PACs that did not make contributions to candidates, parties, or other PACs could accept unlimited contributions from individuals, unions, and corporations (both for profit and not-for-profit) for the purpose of making independent expenditures.

The result of the Citizens United and SpeechNow.org decisions was the rise of a new type of political action committee in 2010, popularly dubbed the "super PAC". In an open meeting on July 22, 2010, the FEC approved two Advisory Opinions to modify FEC policy in accordance with the legal decisions. These Advisory Opinions were issued in response to requests from two existing PACs, the conservative Club for Growth, and the liberal Commonsense Ten (later renamed Senate Majority PAC). Their advisory opinions gave a sample wording letter which all super PACs must submit to qualify for the deregulated status, and such letters continue to be used by super PACs up to the present date. FEC Chairman Steven T. Walther dissented on both opinions and issued a statement giving his thoughts. In the statement, Walther stated "There are provisions of the Act and Commission regulations not addressed by the court in SpeechNow that continue to prohibit Commonsense Ten from soliciting or accepting contributions from political committees in excess of $5,000 annually or any contributions from corporations or labor organizations" (emphasis in original).

The term "super PAC" was coined by reporter Eliza Newlin Carney. According to Politico, Carney, a staff writer covering lobbying and influence for CQ Roll Call, "made the first identifiable, published reference to 'super PAC' as it's known today while working at National Journal, writing on June 26, 2010, of a group called Workers' Voices, that it was a kind of "'super PAC' that could become increasingly popular in the post-Citizens United world."

According to FEC advisories, super PACs are not allowed to coordinate directly with candidates or political parties. This restriction is intended to prevent them from operating campaigns that complement or parallel those of the candidates they support or engaging in negotiations that could result in quid pro quo bargaining between donors to the PAC and the candidate or officeholder. However, it is legal for candidates and super PAC managers to discuss campaign strategy and tactics through the media.

In 2024, a Federal Election Commission ruling eased the restrictions on super PACs. Super PACs were allowed to coordinate with campaigns for the purposes of canvassing, which was deemed not "public communications."

=== Criticism and legal challenges ===
While Citizens United became widely recognized as enabling unlimited political spending, the SpeechNow v. FEC decision has been identified by scholars and journalists as the actual catalyst for super PAC proliferation. Unlike Citizens United, which addressed independent expenditures by corporations and unions, SpeechNow eliminated limits on contributions to political committees making independent expenditures, thereby creating the modern super PAC. The popular focus on Citizens United has largely overshadowed the SpeechNow opinion and its impact on campaign finance practices in U.S. elections.

In the years following the SpeechNow ruling, several states attempted to enact contribution limits on super PACs. All were struck down, with judges citing the SpeechNow precedent.

In 2024, Maine voters overwhelmingly approved a ballot measure limiting super PAC contributions to $5,000, again directly challenging the framework established by SpeechNow. Two super PACs subsequently sued to block the law, and in July 2025, a federal judge ruled in their favor, preventing Maine from enforcing the contribution limits.

The Maine Attorney General and the nonprofit Equal Citizens appealed that decision in Dinner Table Action v. Schneider to the First Circuit Court of Appeals, with former Deputy Solicitor General Neal Katyal serving as lead counsel. The appeal presents an originalist argument that the First Amendment's original meaning would not have prevented legislatures or Congress from limiting contributions, and an argument grounded in Citizens United itself to reinstate contribution limits for super PACs.

As of January, 2026, the case is on appeal before the First Circuit Court of Appeals and remains on track for review by the U.S. Supreme Court, which has never reviewed SpeechNow’s finding that limits on super PAC contributions violate the First Amendment. A reversal of SpeechNow by the Supreme Court would not only allow the Maine law to take effect but also reinstate existing federal and state limits on super PAC contributions.

== Disclosure rules ==
By January 2010, at least 38 states and the federal government required disclosure for all or some independent expenditures or electioneering communications. These disclosures were intended to deter potentially or seemingly corrupting donations. Contributions to, and expenditures by, super PACs are tracked by the FEC and by independent organizations such as OpenSecrets.

Yet despite disclosure rules, political action committees have found ways to get around them.

The 2020 election attracted record amounts of donations from dark money groups to political committees like super PACs. These groups are required to reveal their backers, but they can hide the true source of funding by reporting a non-disclosing nonprofit or shell company as the donor. By using this tactic, dark money groups can get around a 2020 court ruling that attempts to require nonprofits running political ads to reveal their donors.

It is also possible to spend money without voters knowing the identities of donors before voting takes place. In federal elections, for example, political action committees have the option to choose to file reports on a "monthly" or "quarterly" basis. This allows funds raised by PACs in the final days of the election to be spent and votes cast before the report is due and the donors identities' are known.

In one high-profile case, a donor to a super PAC kept his name hidden by using an LLC formed for the purpose of hiding the donor's name. One super PAC, that originally listed a $250,000 donation from an LLC that no one could find, led to a subsequent filing where the previously "secret donors" were revealed. However, campaign finance experts have argued that this tactic is already illegal, since it would constitute a contribution in the name of another.

== Pop-up super PACs ==
A "pop-up" super PAC is one that is formed within 20 days before an election, so that its first finance disclosures will be filed after the election. In 2018 the Center for Public Integrity recorded 44 pop-up super PACs formed on October 18 or later, a year when the Federal Election Commission pre-general election reports covered activity through October 17. In 2020 there were more than 50.

Pop-up super PACs often have local-sounding or issue-oriented names. However, they can be funded by much larger party-affiliated PACs. In 2021 the Campaign Legal Center filed a complaint with the FEC, listing 23 pop-up Super PACs which had failed to disclose their affiliation to other PACs mostly affiliated with leaderships of the two major parties.

== Super PACs in elections ==
=== 2012 presidential election ===
Super PACs may support particular candidacies. In the 2012 presidential election, super PACs played a major role, spending more than the candidates' election campaigns in the Republican primaries. As of early April 2012, Restore Our Future—a super PAC usually described as having been created to help Mitt Romney's presidential campaign—had spent $40 million. Winning Our Future (a pro–Newt Gingrich group) spent $16 million. Some super PACs are run or advised by a candidate's former staff or associates.

In the 2012 election campaign, most of the money given to super PACs came from wealthy individuals, not corporations. According to data from OpenSecrets, the top 100 individual super PAC donors in 2011–2012 made up just 3.7% of contributors, but accounted for more than 80% of the total money raised, while less than 0.5% of the money given to "the most active super PACs" was donated by publicly traded corporations.

As of February 2012, according to OpenSecrets, 313 groups organized as super PACs had received $98,650,993 and spent $46,191,479. This means early in the 2012 election cycle, PACs had already greatly exceeded total receipts of 2008. The leading super PAC on its own raised more money than the combined total spent by the top 9 PACs in the 2008 cycle.

Super PACs have been criticized for relying heavily on negative ads.

The 2012 figures do not include funds raised by state level PACs.

=== 2016 presidential election ===
In the 2016 presidential campaign, super PACs were described (by journalist Matea Gold) as "finding creative ways to work in concert" with the candidates they supported and work around the "narrowly drawn" legal rule that separated political campaigns from outside groups/super PACs. "Nearly every top presidential hopeful" had "a personalized super PAC" that raised "unlimited sums" and was "run by close associates or former aides". Not only did the FEC regulations allow campaigns to "publicly signal their needs to independent groups", political operatives on both sides "can talk to one another directly, as long as they do not discuss candidate strategy." Candidates are even allowed by the FEC "to appear at super PAC fundraisers, as long as they do not solicit more than $5,000".

Representative David E. Price (D–NC) complained "The rules of affiliation are just about as porous as they can be, and it amounts to a joke that there's no coordination between these individual super PACs and the candidates." As of mid-2015, despite receiving 29 complaints about coordination between campaigns and super PACs, "FEC has yet to open an investigation".

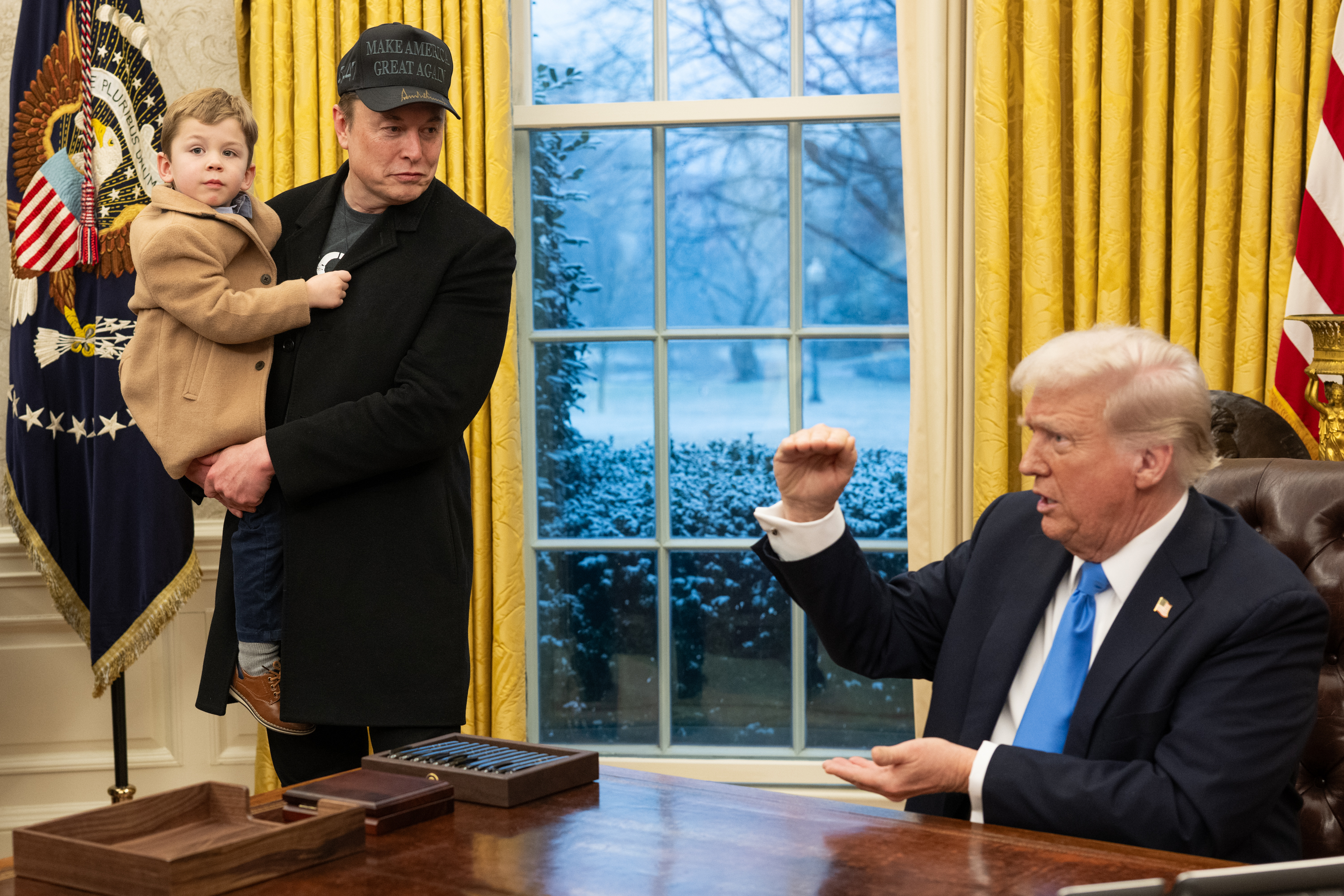
Elon Musk with Donald Trump in February 2025. Trump relied on Musk's America PAC during his 2024 presidential campaign.

=== 2020 presidential election ===
According to Open Secrets, in the 2019–2020 cycle (as of October 29, 2022) 2,415 groups organized as super PACs; they had reported total receipts of a little over $2.5 billion and total independent expenditures of a little under $1.3 billion.

=== 2024 presidential election ===
In the 2024 election cycle, there were 2,458 super PACs that raised $4,290,768,955 and spent $2,727,234,077. Because super PACs were able to coordinate with campaigns on canvassing for the first time, Donald Trump's campaign relied on Elon Musk's America PAC, a super PAC, to lead his get-out-the-vote efforts in swing states.

== See also ==
- Political action committee
- Hybrid PAC
- United Democracy Project (UDP)
