= Faithless elector =

Elector who does not vote for the candidate for whom they had pledged to vote

Faithless elector laws by state Vote voided, with penalty (hatched) Vote voided Vote counted, with penalty (hatched) Vote counted No law

In the United States Electoral College, a faithless elector is an elector who does not vote for the candidates for U.S. President and U.S. Vice President for whom the elector had pledged to vote, and instead votes for another person for one or both offices or abstains from voting. As part of United States presidential elections, each state legislates the method by which its electors are to be selected. Many states require electors to have pledged to vote for the candidates of their party if appointed. The consequences of an elector voting in a way inconsistent with their pledge vary from state to state.

Electors are typically chosen and nominated by a political party or the party's presidential nominee, and are usually party members with a reputation for high loyalty to the party and its chosen candidate. Thus, a faithless elector runs the risk of party censure and political retaliation from their party, as well as potential legal penalties in some states. Candidates for electors are nominated by state political parties in the months prior to Election Day. In some states, such as Indiana, the electors are nominated in primaries, the same way other candidates are nominated. In other states, such as Oklahoma, Virginia, and North Carolina, electors are nominated in party conventions. In Pennsylvania, the campaign committee of each candidate names their candidates for elector in an attempt to discourage faithless electors. In some states, high-ranking or well-known state officials up to and including governors often serve as electors whenever possible (the Constitution prohibits federal officials from acting as electors, but does not restrict state officials from doing so). The parties have generally been successful in keeping their electors faithful, leaving out the rare cases in which a candidate died before the elector was able to cast a vote.

As of the 2024 election, there have been a total of 165 instances of faithlessness, 90 of which were for president and 75 of which were for vice president. They have never swung an election, and nearly all have voted for third party candidates or non-candidates, as opposed to switching their support to a major opposing candidate. There were 63 faithless electors in 1872 when Horace Greeley died between Election Day and when the Electoral College convened, but Ulysses S. Grant had already clinched enough to win reelection. During the 1836 election, Virginia's entire 23-man electoral delegation faithlessly abstained from voting for victorious Democratic vice presidential nominee Richard M. Johnson. The loss of Virginia's support caused Johnson to fall one electoral vote short of a majority, causing the vice-presidential race to be thrown into the U.S. Senate under a contingent election. The presidential election itself was not in dispute because Virginia's electors voted for Democratic presidential nominee Martin Van Buren as pledged. The Senate elected Johnson as vice president anyway after a party-line vote. Uniquely, Richard Nixon always had a faithless elector in one of his state slates during his three runs for president. Oklahoma in 1960, North Carolina in 1968 and Virginia in 1972 all voted for Nixon but one elector cast a vote for another person.

The United States Constitution does not specify a notion of pledging; no federal law or constitutional statute binds an elector's vote to anything. All pledging laws originate at the state level; the U.S. Supreme Court upheld these state laws in its 1952 ruling Ray v. Blair. In 2020, the Supreme Court also ruled in Chiafalo v. Washington that states are free to enforce laws that bind electors to voting for the winner of the popular vote in their state.

== Faithless elector laws ==
As of 2026, 38 states and the District of Columbia have laws that require electors to vote for the candidates for whom they pledged to vote. In 27 states and the District of Columbia, votes contrary to the pledge are voided and the respective electors are replaced; two of these states, North Carolina and Oklahoma, may also fine the elector. (Note: States where a faithless vote is voided and the elector replaced: Arizona, California, Colorado, Delaware, Florida, Hawaii, Illinois, Indiana, Iowa, Maryland, Michigan, Minnesota, Montana, Nebraska, Nevada, New York, North Carolina, North Dakota, Oklahoma, Oregon, South Dakota, Tennessee, Texas, Utah, Vermont, Virginia, and Washington, plus the District of Columbia.) New Mexico and South Carolina impose criminal penalties on faithless electors but still count their votes as cast. In the remaining nine states (Alabama, Alaska, Connecticut, Maine, Massachusetts, Mississippi, Ohio, Wisconsin, and Wyoming), the law contains no specific enforcement provision.

Colorado was the first state to void an elector's faithless vote, which occurred during the 2016 election. Minnesota also invoked this law for the first time in 2016 when an elector pledged to Hillary Clinton attempted to vote for Bernie Sanders instead. Until 2008, Minnesota's electors cast secret ballots. Although the final count would reveal the occurrence of faithless votes, it was impossible to determine which electors were faithless. After an unknown elector was faithless in 2004, Minnesota amended its law to require public balloting of the electors' votes and invalidate any vote cast for someone other than the candidate to whom the elector was pledged.

Washington became the first state to fine faithless electors after the 2016 election, in the wake of that state having four faithless elector votes. In 2019, the state changed its law for future elections, to void faithless votes and replace the respective electors instead of fining them.

== Legal rulings ==
=== Ray v. Blair ===
The constitutionality of state pledge laws was confirmed by the U.S. Supreme Court in 1952 in Ray v. Blair in a 5–2 vote. The court ruled states have the right to require electors to pledge to vote for the candidate whom their party supports, and the right to remove potential electors who refuse to pledge prior to the election. The court also wrote:

However, even if such promises of candidates for the electoral college are legally unenforceable because violative of an assumed constitutional freedom of the elector under the Constitution, Art. II, § 1, to vote as he may choose [emphasis added] in the electoral college, it would not follow that the requirement of a pledge in the primary is unconstitutional.

— U.S. Supreme Court, Ray v. Blair, 1952

The ruling held only that requiring a pledge, not a vote, was constitutional and Justice Jackson, joined by Justice Douglas, wrote in his dissent:

No one faithful to our history can deny that the plan originally contemplated what is implicit in its text – that electors would be free agents, to exercise an independent and nonpartisan judgment as to the men best qualified for the Nation's highest offices.

In 2015, one legal scholar opined that "a state law that would thwart a federal elector’s discretion at an extraordinary time when it reasonably must be exercised would clearly violate Article II and the Twelfth Amendment".

=== Chiafalo v. Washington and Colorado Department of State v. Baca ===
After the 2016 election, electors who attempted to switch their votes in Washington and Colorado were subjected to enforcement of their state's faithless elector laws. The four faithless electors from Washington were each fined $1,000 for breaking their pledge. The electors received legal assistance from the non-profit advocacy group Equal Citizens founded by Lawrence Lessig. The Colorado case, Baca v. Colorado Department of State, was initially dismissed by the United States District Court for the District of Colorado. On appeal, the 10th Circuit ruled in August 2019 that Colorado's faithless elector law is unconstitutional. Specifically, the opinion held that electors have a constitutional right to vote for the presidential candidate of their choice and are not bound by any prior pledges they may have made. The opinion said the act of voting for president in the electoral college is a federal function not subject to state law and state laws requiring electors to vote only for the candidates they pledged are unconstitutional and unenforceable. On October 16, 2019, Colorado appealed the 10th Circuit's decision to the U.S. Supreme Court.

The 10th Circuit's decision conflicted with an earlier May 2019 decision by the Washington Supreme Court In re Guerra, in which three electors who had $1,000 fines imposed on them for violating their pledges appealed the fines, which were upheld. In contrast to the Colorado case, the Washington court held that presidential electors are state officials under the control of state law and can be criminally punished by a state if they do not vote as they pledged. On October 7, 2019, these electors also appealed their case to the U.S. Supreme Court.

On July 6, 2020, the U.S. Supreme Court ruled unanimously in both Chiafalo v. Washington and Colorado Department of State v. Baca that states may enforce laws to punish faithless electors.

== History ==
Over 59 elections, 165 electors have not cast their votes for president or vice president as prescribed by the legislature of the state they represented. Of those:

- 71 electors changed their votes because the candidate to whom they were pledged died before the electoral ballot (in 1872 for president and 1912 for vice president).
- 1 elector chose to abstain from voting for any candidate (in 2000 for president and vice president).
- 93 were changed typically by the elector's personal preference, although there have been some instances where the change may have been caused by an honest mistake.

Usually, faithless electors act alone, although on occasion a faithless elector has attempted to induce other electors to change their votes in concert, usually with little if any success.

One exception was the 1836 election, in which all 23 Virginia electors acted together, altering the outcome of the electoral college vote but failing to change the outcome of the overall election. The Democratic ticket won states with 170 of the 294 electoral votes, but the 23 Virginia electors abstained in the vote for vice president, meaning the Democratic nominee, Richard M. Johnson, received 147 votes or exactly half of the electoral college (one short of being elected). Johnson was subsequently elected vice president by the U.S. Senate.

== List of faithless electors ==
The following is a list of all faithless electors. The number preceding each entry is the number of faithless electors in the given year's election.

=== 1788 to 1800: Before the 12th Amendment ===
3 – 1788–89 election: three electors, two from Maryland and one from Virginia, did not vote (Note: Additionally, another elector from Virginia was not chosen because an election district failed to submit returns.)

3 – 1792 election: three electors, two from Maryland and one from Vermont, did not vote

19 – 1796 election: Samuel Miles, an elector from Pennsylvania, was pledged to vote for Federalist presidential candidate John Adams, but voted for Democratic-Republican candidate Thomas Jefferson. He cast his other vote as pledged for Thomas Pinckney; there was no provision at the time for specifying president or vice president. An additional 18 electors voted for Adams as pledged, but refused to vote for Pinckney. This was an attempt to foil Alexander Hamilton's rumored plan to elect Pinckney as president, and this resulted in the unintended outcome that Adams' opponent, Jefferson, was elected vice president instead of Adams' running mate, Pinckney. This was the only time in U.S. history that the president and vice president have been from different parties, except for 1864 (although in that year, while the president and the vice presidential running mate were from different parties, they ran on one ticket from the same third party), and the only time the winners were from different tickets.

=== 1804 to 1840 ===
6 – 1808 election: Six electors from New York were pledged to vote for Democratic-Republican James Madison for president and former New York governor George Clinton for vice president. Instead, they voted for Clinton for president, with three voting for Madison for vice president and the other three voting for James Monroe for vice president.

3 – 1812 election: Three electors pledged to vote for Federalist vice-presidential candidate Jared Ingersoll instead voted for Elbridge Gerry.

1 – 1820 election: William Plumer was pledged to vote for Democratic-Republican presidential candidate James Monroe, who was not contested for re-election, but he instead cast his vote for John Quincy Adams, who was not a candidate in the election. Plumer told his fellow electors that Monroe had mismanaged the nation's finances and that Adams was well qualified for the presidency. His son, Representative William Plumer Jr., later suggested that he may also have wanted to draw attention to his friend Adams as a future presidential candidate, though nothing in the contemporary record indicates this. The popular story that he voted this way so that George Washington would remain the only president elected unanimously arose about sixty years later and has no support in Plumer's papers or in contemporary accounts. Plumer also cast his vice-presidential vote for Richard Rush, not Daniel D. Tompkins as pledged.

7 – 1828 election: Seven of the nine electors from Georgia refused to vote for vice-presidential candidate John C. Calhoun; they instead cast their vice-presidential votes for William Smith.

30 – 1832 election: All 30 electors from Pennsylvania refused to vote for the Democratic vice-presidential candidate, Martin Van Buren, voting instead for William Wilkins.

23 – 1836 election: The 23 electors from Virginia were pledged to vote for Democratic candidates Martin Van Buren for president and Richard M. Johnson for vice president. However, they refused to vote for Johnson because of his open liaison with an enslaved woman and voted instead for Senator William Smith of South Carolina, which left Johnson with 147 electoral votes, one short of a majority. Johnson was subsequently elected vice president after a contingent election in the Senate.

1 – 1840 election: One elector from Virginia, Arthur Smith of Isle of Wight County, was pledged to vote for Democratic candidates Martin Van Buren for president and Richard M. Johnson for vice president; however, he voted for James K. Polk for vice president.

=== 1864 to 1912 ===
1 – 1864 election: A Nevada elector was snowbound and therefore prevented from casting any ballots.

63 – 1872 election: Horace Greeley, the Liberal Republican/Democrat presidential nominee, died on November 29 shortly before the Electoral College vote in December. Three electors voted for the deceased Greeley as pledged, while the other 63 electors pledged to Greeley voted for other people, with 42 voting for non-candidate Thomas A. Hendricks, 18 voting for Greeley's running mate, Benjamin Gratz Brown, 2 voting for non-candidate Charles J. Jenkins, and 1 voting for non-candidate David Davis. The three posthumous presidential votes cast for Greeley were rejected by Congress.

27 – 1896 election: The Democratic Party and the People's Party both ran William Jennings Bryan as their presidential candidate, but ran different candidates for vice president: the Democratic Party nominated Arthur Sewall and the People's Party nominated Thomas E. Watson. Although the Populist ticket did not win the popular vote in any state, 27 Democratic electors cast their vice-presidential vote for Watson instead of Sewall.

8 – 1912 election: the Republican vice-presidential candidate, James S. Sherman, died six days before the popular election. The Republicans had won only two states, Utah and Vermont, and Nicholas M. Butler was hastily designated to receive the eight electoral votes that were pledged to Sherman. All eight Republican electors accordingly voted for Butler for vice president.

=== 1948 to 2004 ===
1 – 1948 election: Tennessee Elector Preston Parks was a candidate to be an elector for both the Democratic Party presidential candidate, Harry S. Truman, and the States' Rights Democratic Party presidential candidate, Strom Thurmond. Though the national Democratic Party won the election, Parks had actively campaigned for Thurmond and he voted for Thurmond and his running mate Fielding L. Wright.

1 – 1956 election: Alabama Elector W. F. Turner, pledged for Democrats Adlai Stevenson and Estes Kefauver, cast his votes for Judge Walter Burgwyn Jones and Herman Talmadge, the former Governor of Georgia.

1 – 1960 election: Oklahoma Elector Henry D. Irwin, pledged for Republicans Richard Nixon and Henry Cabot Lodge Jr., contacted the other 219 Republican electors to convince them to cast presidential electoral votes for Democratic non-candidate Harry F. Byrd and vice-presidential electoral votes for Republican Barry Goldwater. Most replied they had a moral obligation to vote for Nixon and Lodge, while Irwin voted for Byrd and Goldwater. Fourteen unpledged electors (eight from Mississippi and six from Alabama) also voted for Byrd for president, but supported Strom Thurmond for vice president – since they were not pledged to anyone, their action was not faithless.

1 – 1968 election: North Carolina Elector Lloyd W. Bailey, pledged for Republicans Richard Nixon and Spiro Agnew, cast his votes for American Independent Party candidates George Wallace and Curtis LeMay. Bailey later stated at a Senate hearing that he would have voted for Nixon and Agnew if his vote would have altered the outcome of the election.

1 – 1972 election: Virginia Elector Roger MacBride, pledged for Republicans Richard Nixon and Spiro Agnew, cast his electoral votes for Libertarian candidates John Hospers and Tonie Nathan. MacBride's vice-presidential vote for Nathan was the first electoral vote cast for a woman in U.S. history.

1 – 1976 election: Washington Elector Mike Padden, pledged for Republicans Gerald Ford and Bob Dole, cast his presidential electoral vote for Ronald Reagan, who had challenged Ford for the Republican nomination. He cast his vice presidential vote, as pledged, for Dole.

1 – 1988 election: West Virginia Elector Margarette Leach, pledged for Democrats Michael Dukakis and Lloyd Bentsen, instead cast her votes for the candidates in the reverse of their positions on the national ticket as a form of protest against the winner-take-all custom of the Electoral College; her presidential vote went to Bentsen and her vice-presidential vote to Dukakis.

1 – 2000 election: Washington, D.C. Elector Barbara Lett-Simmons, pledged for Democrats Al Gore and Joe Lieberman, cast no electoral votes as a protest of Washington D.C.'s lack of voting congressional representation. Lett-Simmons's electoral college abstention, the first since 1864, was intended to protest what Lett-Simmons referred to as the federal district's "colonial status". Lett-Simmons described her blank ballot as an act of civil disobedience, not an act of a faithless elector; Lett-Simmons supported Gore and Lieberman and would have voted for Gore and Lieberman if she had thought they had a chance to win.

1 – 2004 election: An anonymous Minnesota elector, pledged for Democrats John Kerry and John Edwards, cast their presidential vote for "John Ewards" [sic], rather than Kerry, presumably by accident. All of Minnesota's electors cast their vice presidential ballots for John Edwards, including the elector who cast the anomalous presidential vote. Minnesota's electors cast secret ballots, so the identity of the faithless elector is not known. As a result of this incident, Minnesota statutes were amended to provide for public balloting of the electors' votes and invalidation of a vote cast for someone other than the candidate to whom the elector is pledged.

=== 2016 ===
10 – 2016 election:

- In Washington, Democratic Party electors gave three presidential votes to Colin Powell and one to Faith Spotted Eagle and these electors cast vice-presidential votes for Elizabeth Warren, Maria Cantwell, Susan Collins, and Winona LaDuke.
- In Hawaii, Bernie Sanders received one presidential vote and Elizabeth Warren received one vice-presidential vote.
- In Texas, Christopher Suprun voted for John Kasich for president and William Greene voted for Ron Paul, giving each one presidential vote. Suprun also voted for Carly Fiorina as vice president while Greene voted for Mike Pence as pledged.

In addition, three other electors attempted to vote against their pledges but had their votes invalidated:

- In Colorado, Kasich received one vote for president, which was invalidated, and the elector was replaced by one who cast a vote for Hillary Clinton.
- In Maine, a Democratic Party elector, David Bright, attempted to vote for Sanders for president but ultimately cast a vote for Clinton.
- A Minnesota Democratic-Farmer-Labor Party elector voted for Sanders for president and Tulsi Gabbard for vice president, but these votes were invalidated and the elector was replaced by an alternate elector who then cast votes for Clinton and Tim Kaine.

== See also ==
- Unpledged elector
- Indirect election
