= 2016 United States presidential election in Virginia =

- November 8, 2016
- Turnout: 72.1% (of registered voters) ▲

Nominee	Hillary Clinton	Donald Trump
Party	Democratic	Republican
Home state	New York	New York
Running mate	Tim Kaine	Mike Pence
Electoral vote	13	0
Popular vote	1,981,473	1,769,443
Percentage	49.73%	44.41%

Clinton
40–50%
50–60%
60–70%
70–80%
80–90%
90–100%
Trump
40–50%
50–60%
60–70%
70–80%
80–90%
President before election
Barack Obama
Democratic
Elected President
Donald Trump
Republican

Treemap of the popular vote by county

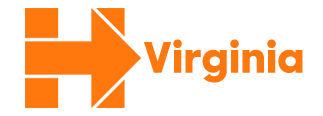
Logo used by Clinton's Virginia campaign

The 2016 United States presidential election in Virginia was held on November 8, 2016, as part of the 2016 general election in which all 50 states plus the District of Columbia participated. Virginia voters chose electors to represent them in the Electoral College via a popular vote pitting the Republican nominee, businessman Donald Trump, and running mate Indiana Governor Mike Pence against Democratic nominee, former Secretary of State Hillary Clinton and her running mate, Virginia Senator Tim Kaine.

The Democratic candidate, Hillary Clinton of New York, carried Virginia with a 49.73% plurality in the popular vote against businessman Donald Trump of New York, who carried 44.41%, a victory margin of 5.32%. Clinton seemed to benefit from having former Virginia governor Tim Kaine on the ticket. Whereas the national popular vote swung 1.77% Republican from the previous election, Virginia swung 1.44% Democratic. However, due to a higher third-party vote, Clinton's percentage was lower than Obama's in both 2008 and 2012 (although her raw vote total slightly improved from Obama in 2012).

This was the first time Virginia voted for a losing Democratic candidate since 1924. The state would later vote for a Democratic nominee who lost the popular vote in 2024 by a larger margin than Clinton's 2016 margin, solidifying the state's status as a blue state.

Conversely, Trump became the first Republican since Calvin Coolidge in 1924 to win the presidency without carrying Virginia. Virginia had been a traditionally Democratic-leaning state from the party's founding until 1952. It then became reliably Republican-leaning from 1952 until 2004, after which point it has voted Democratic in every presidential election.

As of the 2024 election, Trump in 2016 is the most recent Republican candidate to win Chesapeake, Chesterfield County, James City County, Stafford County, and Virginia Beach.

== Primaries ==
=== Democratic primary ===
The 108 delegates (95 pledged delegates and 13 super delegates) from Virginia to the Democratic National Convention were allocated in this way. Among the pledged delegates, 62 were allocated based on the popular vote in each congressional district. The 33 at-large delegates were then allocated based on the statewide popular vote.

County results of the Virginia Democratic presidential primary, 2016 Hillary Clinton Bernie Sanders

Virginia Democratic primary, March 1, 2016
Candidate	Popular vote		Estimated delegates		
Candidate	Count	Percentage	Pledged	Unpledged	Total
Hillary Clinton	504,741	64.29%	62	13	75
Bernie Sanders	276,370	35.20%	33	0	33
Martin O'Malley (withdrawn)	3,930	0.50%			
Uncommitted	—N/a		0	1	1
Total	785,041	100%	95	14	109

=== Republican primary ===
The 49 delegates from Virginia to the Republican National Convention were allocated proportionally based on the popular vote.

Virginia Republican primary, March 1, 2016
Candidate	Votes	Percentage	Actual delegate count		
Candidate	Votes	Percentage	Bound	Unbound	Total
Donald Trump	356,840	34.80%	17	0	17
Marco Rubio	327,918	31.98%	16	0	16
Ted Cruz	171,150	16.69%	8	0	8
John Kasich	97,784	9.54%	5	0	5
Ben Carson	60,228	5.87%	3	0	3
Jeb Bush (withdrawn)	3,645	0.36%	0	0	0
Rand Paul (withdrawn)	2,917	0.28%	0	0	0
Mike Huckabee (withdrawn)	1,458	0.14%	0	0	0
Chris Christie (withdrawn)	1,102	0.11%	0	0	0
Carly Fiorina (withdrawn)	914	0.09%	0	0	0
Jim Gilmore (withdrawn)	653	0.06%	0	0	0
Lindsey Graham (withdrawn)	444	0.04%	0	0	0
Rick Santorum (withdrawn)	399	0.04%	0	0	0
Unprojected delegates:			0	0	0
Total:	1,025,452	100.00%	49	0	49

=== Libertarian nomination ===
The 2016 Libertarian Party presidential ticket was former New Mexico Governor Gary Johnson for president and former Massachusetts Governor Bill Weld for vice president. They earned those nominations at the Libertarian Party 2016 National ConDay weekend.

=== Green primary ===
The Virginia Green Party held its primary from March 20 through April 3. Party members were able to vote online through an email ballot or through the mail. On April 13, it was announced that Jill Stein had won with 76% of the vote. The state's four delegates were apportioned at the May 28 state meeting.

Virginia primary, April 3, 2016
Candidate	Votes	Percentage	National delegates
Jill Stein	35	76%	3
Kent Mesplay	3	6%	1
William Kreml	2	4.1%	-
Darryl Cherney	2	3.8%	-
Sedinam Curry	1	1.7%	-
Write-ins	3	8.4%	-
Total	46	100.00%	4

== General election ==
=== Polling ===
In polling, Hillary Clinton won or tied in every pre-election poll but one. An average of the last three polls showed Clinton ahead of Trump 48% to 43%, which was accurate compared to the results.

=== Voting history ===
Virginia joined the Union in June 1788 and has participated in all elections from 1789 onwards, except 1864 and 1868 (due to its secession from the US due to the American Civil War). Since 1900, Virginia voted Democratic 54.17% of the time and Republican 45.83% of the time. From 1968 to 2004, Virginia voted for the Republican Party candidate. Then, in the 2008 and 2012 elections, the state voted for the Democratic Party. The same trend continued in the 2016 presidential elections.

Clinton had several advantages in Virginia. The first was due in part to her landslide win in the Democratic primary against Senator Bernie Sanders. The second was Virginia has a significant number of African American voters, many of whom backed Clinton in the primary and both of President Barack Obama's wins in the state. The third was the state's growing share of well-educated suburban voters, especially in the suburbs surrounding Washington, D.C., and Richmond who were moving away from the Republican Party in response to Trump being nominated for president. The fourth was Clinton's pick of the state's own US Senator, Tim Kaine, as her vice presidential running mate.

While polls throughout the campaign showed Clinton leading Republican Donald Trump by varying margins in Virginia, it was announced on October 13 that the Trump campaign was pulling its resources out of the state, likely ceding to Clinton what was perceived to be a critical battleground state. According to the Trump campaign, the reason for pulling out of Virginia was to compete in more critical battleground states like Pennsylvania, Florida, North Carolina, and Ohio, all of which were states he won.

=== Predictions ===
The following are final 2016 predictions from various organizations for Virginia as of election day.

Source	Ranking	As of
Los Angeles Times	Lean D	November 6, 2016
CNN	Lean D	November 8, 2016
Rothenberg Political Report	Likely D	November 7, 2016
Sabato's Crystal Ball	Likely D	November 7, 2016
NBC	Likely D	November 7, 2016
Electoral-vote.com	Likely D	November 8, 2016
RealClearPolitics	Likely D	November 7, 2016
Fox News	Lean D	November 7, 2016
ABC	Lean D	November 8, 2016

=== Results ===
State senate district results: Clinton 50–60% 60–70% 70–80% / Trump 50–60% 60–70% 70–80%

2016 United States presidential election in Virginia
Party	Candidate	Running mate	Votes	Percentage	Electoral votes
Democratic	Hillary Clinton	Tim Kaine	1,981,473	49.73%	13
Republican	Donald Trump	Mike Pence	1,769,443	44.41%	0
Libertarian	Gary Johnson	Bill Weld	118,274	2.97%	0
Independent	Evan McMullin	Mindy Finn	54,054	1.36%	0
Green	Jill Stein	Ajamu Baraka	27,638	0.69%	0
Independent (write-in)	-	-	33,749	0.85%	0
Totals			3,984,631	100.00%	13
Voter turnout (Voting age population)					71.30%

==== By county and independent city ====
Locality	Hillary Clinton Democratic		Donald Trump Republican		Other candidates Various parties		Margin		Total votes cast
Locality	#	%	#	%	#	%	#	%	Total votes cast
Accomack	6,740	42.61%	8,583	54.26%	495	3.13%	−1,843	−11.65%	15,818
Albemarle	33,345	58.78%	19,259	33.95%	4,122	7.27%	14,086	24.83%	56,726
Alexandria	57,242	75.55%	13,285	17.53%	5,243	6.92%	43,957	58.01%	75,770
Alleghany	2,166	29.57%	4,874	66.54%	285	3.89%	−2,708	−36.97%	7,325
Amelia	2,128	30.23%	4,708	66.88%	204	2.90%	−2,580	−36.65%	7,040
Amherst	5,057	32.85%	9,719	63.13%	620	4.03%	−4,662	−30.28%	15,396
Appomattox	2,023	25.25%	5,715	71.34%	273	3.41%	−3,692	−46.09%	8,011
Arlington	92,016	75.82%	20,186	16.63%	9,154	7.54%	71,830	59.19%	121,356
Augusta	8,177	22.50%	26,163	71.99%	2,003	5.51%	−17,986	−49.49%	36,343
Bath	603	26.76%	1,548	68.71%	102	4.53%	−945	−41.94%	2,253
Bedford	9,768	22.97%	30,659	72.10%	2,098	4.93%	−20,891	−49.13%	42,525
Bland	453	14.43%	2,573	81.97%	113	3.60%	−2,120	−67.54%	3,139
Botetourt	4,494	23.98%	13,375	71.38%	870	4.64%	−8,881	−47.39%	18,739
Bristol	1,835	26.09%	4,892	69.57%	305	4.34%	−3,057	−43.47%	7,032
Brunswick	4,481	58.43%	3,046	39.72%	142	1.85%	1,435	18.71%	7,669
Buchanan	1,721	18.61%	7,296	78.90%	230	2.49%	−5,575	−60.29%	9,247
Buckingham	3,128	42.88%	3,950	54.15%	217	2.97%	−822	−11.27%	7,295
Buena Vista	693	28.79%	1,430	59.41%	284	11.80%	−737	−30.62%	2,407
Campbell	6,664	24.20%	19,551	71.00%	1,320	4.79%	−12,887	−46.80%	27,535
Caroline	6,432	43.28%	7,147	48.09%	1,284	8.64%	−715	−4.81%	14,863
Carroll	2,559	18.72%	10,663	78.01%	446	3.26%	−8,104	−59.29%	13,668
Charles City	2,496	60.77%	1,476	35.94%	135	3.29%	1,020	24.84%	4,107
Charlotte	2,155	37.10%	3,479	59.90%	174	3.00%	−1,324	−22.80%	5,808
Charlottesville	17,901	79.66%	2,960	13.17%	1,611	7.17%	14,941	66.49%	22,472
Chesapeake	52,627	46.69%	54,047	47.95%	6,031	5.35%	−1,420	−1.26%	112,705
Chesterfield	81,074	45.94%	85,045	48.19%	10,342	5.86%	−3,971	−2.25%	176,461
Clarke	3,051	37.15%	4,661	56.75%	501	6.10%	−1,610	−19.60%	8,213
Colonial Heights	2,367	27.99%	5,681	67.18%	409	4.84%	−3,314	−39.19%	8,457
Covington	914	38.37%	1,349	56.63%	119	5.00%	−435	−18.26%	2,382
Craig	541	19.36%	2,140	76.59%	113	4.04%	−1,599	−57.23%	2,794
Culpeper	7,759	34.92%	13,349	60.08%	1,110	5.00%	−5,590	−25.16%	22,218
Cumberland	2,036	41.50%	2,697	54.97%	173	3.53%	−661	−13.47%	4,906
Danville	11,059	58.35%	7,303	38.53%	590	3.11%	3,756	19.82%	18,952
Dickenson	1,335	20.73%	4,932	76.58%	173	2.69%	−3,597	−55.85%	6,440
Dinwiddie	5,765	42.47%	7,447	54.86%	363	2.67%	−1,682	−12.39%	13,575
Emporia	1,530	64.64%	789	33.33%	48	2.03%	741	31.31%	2,367
Essex	2,542	47.00%	2,657	49.13%	209	3.86%	−115	−2.13%	5,408
Fairfax City	7,367	61.24%	3,702	30.77%	961	7.99%	3,665	30.47%	12,030
Fairfax County	355,133	64.43%	157,710	28.61%	38,340	6.96%	197,423	35.82%	551,183
Falls Church	5,819	75.02%	1,324	17.07%	614	7.92%	4,495	57.95%	7,757
Fauquier	12,971	34.62%	22,127	59.06%	2,369	6.32%	−9,156	−24.44%	37,467
Floyd	2,300	28.57%	5,293	65.74%	458	5.69%	−2,993	−37.18%	8,051
Fluvanna	5,760	42.36%	7,025	51.67%	812	5.97%	−1,265	−9.30%	13,597
Franklin City	2,519	61.89%	1,421	34.91%	130	3.19%	1,098	26.98%	4,070
Franklin County	7,257	26.91%	18,569	68.85%	1,145	4.25%	−11,312	−41.94%	26,971
Frederick	11,932	29.51%	26,083	64.50%	2,425	6.00%	−14,151	−34.99%	40,440
Fredericksburg	6,707	59.54%	3,744	33.24%	813	7.22%	2,963	26.31%	11,264
Galax	681	28.66%	1,603	67.47%	92	3.87%	−922	−38.80%	2,376
Giles	1,950	23.75%	5,910	71.97%	352	4.29%	−3,960	−48.22%	8,212
Gloucester	5,404	27.54%	13,096	66.75%	1,119	5.70%	−7,692	−39.21%	19,619
Goochland	4,889	34.83%	8,384	59.73%	764	5.44%	−3,495	−24.90%	14,037
Grayson	1,407	19.31%	5,592	76.76%	286	3.93%	−4,185	−57.45%	7,285
Greene	2,924	30.43%	5,945	61.88%	739	7.69%	−3,021	−31.44%	9,608
Greensville	2,558	58.63%	1,737	39.81%	68	1.56%	821	18.82%	4,363
Halifax	6,897	40.57%	9,704	57.08%	400	2.35%	−2,807	−16.51%	17,001
Hampton	41,312	66.25%	17,902	28.71%	3,142	5.04%	23,410	37.54%	62,356
Hanover	19,382	30.89%	39,630	63.15%	3,741	5.96%	−20,248	−32.27%	62,753
Harrisonburg	10,212	56.76%	6,262	34.80%	1,519	8.44%	3,950	21.95%	17,993
Henrico	93,935	57.40%	59,857	36.58%	9,862	6.03%	34,078	20.82%	163,654
Henry	8,198	34.01%	15,208	63.09%	700	2.90%	−7,010	−29.08%	24,106
Highland	371	26.67%	958	68.87%	62	4.46%	−587	−42.20%	1,391
Hopewell	4,724	52.44%	3,885	43.13%	399	4.43%	839	9.31%	9,008
Isle of Wight	7,881	37.40%	12,204	57.91%	990	4.70%	−4,323	−20.51%	21,075
James City	19,105	44.25%	21,306	49.35%	2,762	6.40%	−2,201	−5.10%	43,173
King and Queen	1,468	39.71%	2,099	56.78%	130	3.52%	−631	−17.07%	3,697
King George	4,007	33.23%	7,341	60.88%	711	5.90%	−3,334	−27.65%	12,059
King William	2,760	30.13%	5,975	65.22%	426	4.65%	−3,215	−35.09%	9,161
Lancaster	2,869	43.18%	3,523	53.02%	253	3.81%	−654	−9.84%	6,645
Lee	1,627	17.31%	7,543	80.25%	229	2.44%	−5,916	−62.94%	9,399
Lexington	1,514	61.42%	766	31.08%	185	7.51%	748	30.34%	2,465
Loudoun	100,795	55.05%	69,949	38.20%	12,353	6.75%	30,846	16.85%	183,097
Louisa	6,212	35.23%	10,528	59.71%	891	5.05%	−4,316	−24.48%	17,631
Lunenburg	2,227	39.87%	3,204	57.36%	155	2.77%	−977	−17.49%	5,586
Lynchburg	14,792	41.47%	17,982	50.41%	2,897	8.12%	−3,190	−8.94%	35,671
Madison	2,203	31.57%	4,419	63.32%	357	5.12%	−2,216	−31.75%	6,979
Manassas	8,423	54.66%	5,953	38.63%	1,035	6.72%	2,470	16.03%	15,411
Manassas Park	3,204	61.24%	1,733	33.12%	295	5.64%	1,471	28.12%	5,232
Martinsville	3,533	59.81%	2,149	36.38%	225	3.81%	1,384	23.43%	5,907
Mathews	1,563	29.43%	3,517	66.22%	231	4.35%	−1,954	−36.79%	5,311
Mecklenburg	6,285	42.05%	8,288	55.46%	372	2.49%	−2,003	−13.40%	14,945
Middlesex	2,108	35.03%	3,670	60.99%	239	3.97%	−1,562	−25.96%	6,017
Montgomery	20,021	46.53%	19,459	45.22%	3,551	8.25%	562	1.31%	43,031
Nelson	3,689	44.35%	4,154	49.94%	475	5.71%	−465	−5.59%	8,318
New Kent	3,546	28.97%	8,118	66.31%	578	4.72%	−4,572	−37.35%	12,242
Newport News	45,618	60.25%	25,468	33.64%	4,629	6.11%	20,150	26.61%	75,715
Norfolk	57,023	68.38%	21,552	25.85%	4,813	5.77%	35,471	42.54%	83,388
Northampton	3,255	52.74%	2,686	43.52%	231	3.74%	569	9.22%	6,172
Northumberland	2,852	38.55%	4,302	58.15%	244	3.30%	−1,450	−19.60%	7,398
Norton	383	26.23%	1,021	69.93%	56	3.84%	−638	−43.70%	1,460
Nottoway	2,829	41.95%	3,712	55.04%	203	3.01%	−883	−13.09%	6,744
Orange	5,957	34.49%	10,521	60.92%	792	4.59%	−4,564	−26.43%	17,270
Page	2,514	23.41%	7,831	72.91%	395	3.68%	−5,317	−49.51%	10,740
Patrick	1,768	20.74%	6,454	75.71%	303	3.55%	−4,686	−54.97%	8,525
Petersburg	12,021	87.20%	1,451	10.53%	314	2.28%	10,570	76.67%	13,786
Pittsylvania	9,199	29.11%	21,554	68.21%	845	2.67%	−12,355	−39.10%	31,598
Poquoson	1,601	22.31%	5,092	70.95%	484	6.74%	−3,491	−48.64%	7,177
Portsmouth	28,497	65.87%	12,795	29.57%	1,973	4.56%	15,702	36.29%	43,265
Powhatan	4,060	24.02%	11,885	70.33%	955	5.65%	−7,825	−46.30%	16,900
Prince Edward	4,591	50.21%	4,101	44.85%	451	4.93%	490	5.36%	9,143
Prince George	6,419	39.66%	9,157	56.58%	608	3.76%	−2,738	−16.92%	16,184
Prince William	113,144	57.57%	71,721	36.49%	11,673	5.94%	41,423	21.08%	196,538
Pulaski	4,172	27.51%	10,322	68.06%	673	4.44%	−6,150	−40.55%	15,167
Radford	2,925	48.07%	2,638	43.35%	522	8.58%	287	4.72%	6,085
Rappahannock	1,747	38.97%	2,539	56.64%	197	4.39%	−792	−17.67%	4,483
Richmond City	81,259	78.52%	15,581	15.06%	6,644	6.42%	65,678	63.47%	103,484
Richmond County	1,347	36.79%	2,213	60.45%	101	2.76%	−866	−23.65%	3,661
Roanoke City	22,286	56.47%	14,789	37.47%	2,391	6.06%	7,497	19.00%	39,466
Roanoke County	17,200	33.41%	31,408	61.00%	2,881	5.60%	−14,208	−27.59%	51,489
Rockbridge	3,508	32.50%	6,680	61.88%	607	5.62%	−3,172	−29.38%	10,795
Rockingham	9,366	24.98%	25,990	69.33%	2,131	5.68%	−16,624	−44.35%	37,487
Russell	2,330	19.03%	9,521	77.75%	395	3.23%	−7,191	−58.72%	12,246
Salem	4,202	34.37%	7,226	59.11%	797	6.52%	−3,024	−24.74%	12,225
Scott	1,581	15.65%	8,247	81.65%	272	2.69%	−6,666	−66.00%	10,100
Shenandoah	5,273	25.71%	14,094	68.71%	1,146	5.59%	−8,821	−43.00%	20,513
Smyth	2,665	20.67%	9,750	75.64%	475	3.69%	−7,085	−54.97%	12,890
Southampton	3,595	40.49%	5,035	56.71%	248	2.79%	−1,440	−16.22%	8,878
Spotsylvania	24,207	38.69%	34,623	55.34%	3,732	5.97%	−10,416	−16.65%	62,562
Stafford	27,908	42.33%	33,868	51.37%	4,158	6.31%	−5,960	−9.04%	65,934
Staunton	5,333	47.38%	5,133	45.61%	789	7.01%	200	1.78%	11,255
Suffolk	23,280	53.84%	18,006	41.64%	1,954	4.52%	5,274	12.20%	43,240
Surry	2,272	53.74%	1,819	43.02%	137	3.24%	453	10.71%	4,228
Sussex	2,879	57.08%	2,055	40.74%	110	2.18%	824	16.34%	5,044
Tazewell	2,895	15.59%	15,168	81.70%	503	2.71%	−12,273	−66.10%	18,566
Virginia Beach	91,032	44.79%	98,224	48.32%	14,006	6.89%	−7,192	−3.54%	203,262
Warren	5,169	28.78%	11,773	65.55%	1,018	5.67%	−6,604	−36.77%	17,960
Washington	5,553	21.48%	19,320	74.75%	974	3.77%	−13,767	−53.26%	25,847
Waynesboro	3,764	40.90%	4,801	52.16%	639	6.94%	−1,037	−11.27%	9,204
Westmoreland	3,836	44.74%	4,448	51.88%	290	3.38%	−612	−7.14%	8,574
Williamsburg	5,206	68.27%	1,925	25.24%	495	6.49%	3,281	43.02%	7,626
Winchester	5,164	48.41%	4,790	44.90%	713	6.68%	374	3.51%	10,667
Wise	2,701	17.81%	12,086	79.71%	376	2.48%	−9,385	−61.89%	15,163
Wythe	2,770	20.76%	10,046	75.29%	527	3.95%	−7,276	−54.53%	13,343
York	12,999	38.10%	18,837	55.21%	2,282	6.69%	−5,838	−17.11%	34,118
Totals	1,981,473	49.73%	1,769,443	44.41%	233,715	5.87%	212,030	5.32%	3,984,631

===== Counties and independent cities that flipped from Democratic to Republican =====
- Buckingham (largest town: Dillwyn)
- Caroline (largest town: Bowling Green)
- Chesapeake (independent city)
- Covington (independent city)
- Essex (largest town: Tappahannock)
- Nelson (largest community: Nellysford)
- Westmoreland (largest town: Colonial Beach)

===== Counties and independent cities that flipped from Republican to Democratic =====
- Montgomery (largest town: Blacksburg)

==== By congressional district ====
Despite losing the state, Trump won six of 11 congressional districts, with the remaining five going to Clinton, including one that elected a Republican.

District	Clinton	Trump	Representative
1st	41%	53%	Rob Wittman
2nd	45%	48%	Scott Rigell
2nd	45%	48%	Scott Taylor
3rd	63%	32%	Bobby Scott
4th	58%	37%	Randy Forbes
4th	58%	37%	Donald McEachin
5th	42%	53%	Robert Hurt
5th	42%	53%	Tom Garrett Jr.
6th	35%	59%	Bob Goodlatte
7th	44%	50%	Dave Brat
8th	72%	21%	Don Beyer
9th	27%	68%	Morgan Griffith
10th	52%	42%	Barbara Comstock
11th	66%	27%	Gerry Connolly

== Analysis ==
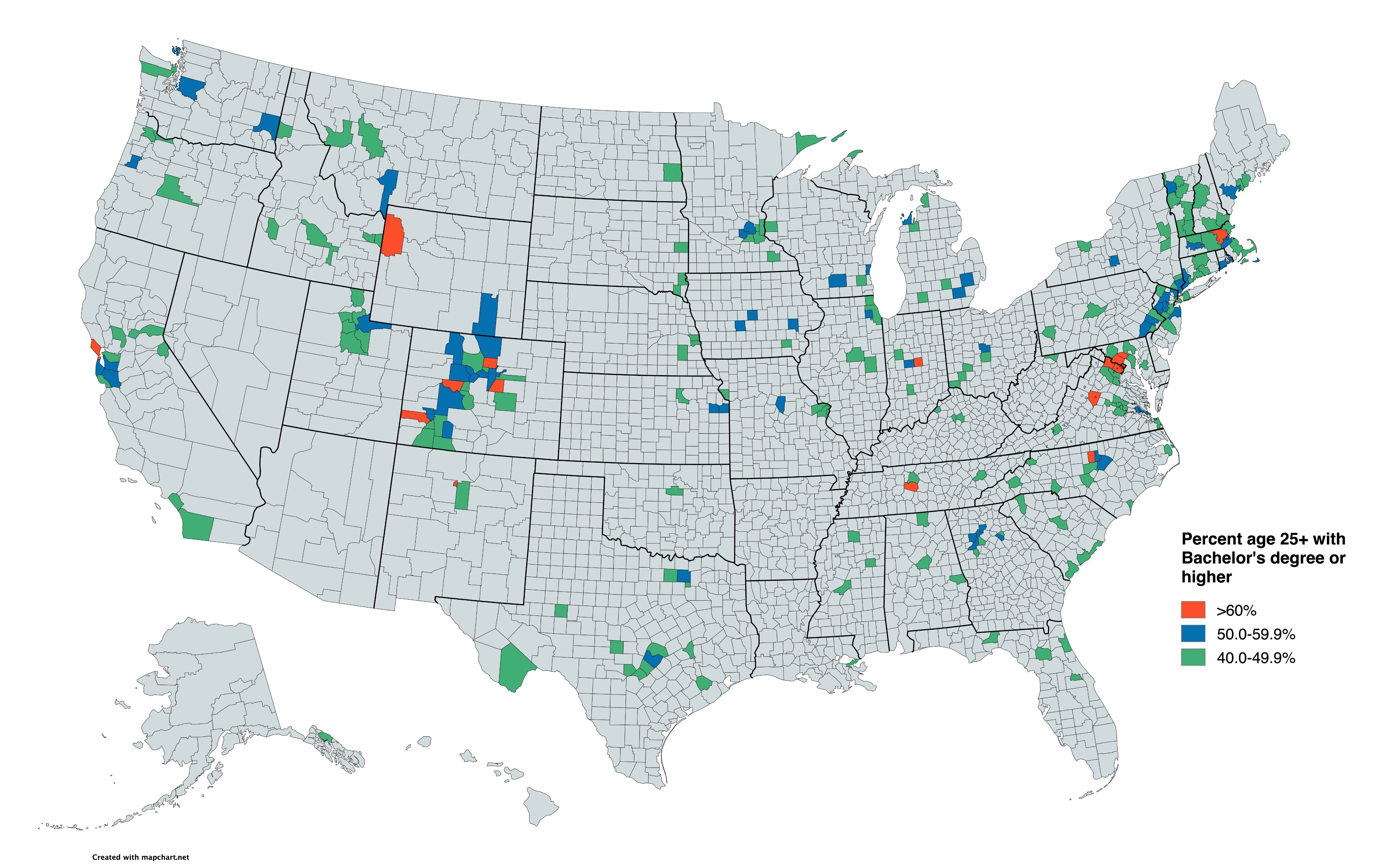
A map of the most college-educated counties in the United States

Virginia was the only one of the eleven states that composed the Confederate States of America to vote Democratic in this election. (Note: This would happen again in 2024.) This is a reversal from 1976, when it was the only state that had been part of the Confederacy to vote Republican.

Virginia swung leftward from 2012, because of Clinton's gains in Northern Virginia, Albemarle County, Greater Richmond, and Hampton Roads. These regions are highly educated, with Northern Virginia and Albemarle County having some of the largest leftward swings and being some of the best-educated areas in the country, as shown on the map of the most college-educated counties in the United States.

Virginia was also the only state Hillary Clinton won which was never carried by her husband Bill Clinton in either of his runs for president in 1992 and 1996. Virginia was one of eleven states (and the District of Columbia) to vote more Democratic than in 2012. (Note: The other ten are Arizona, California, Georgia, Washington, Illinois, Kansas, Massachusetts, Maryland, Texas, and Utah) This was only the third time since Reconstruction that Virginia voted for a different candidate than Florida, after 1976 and 1996, and the first in 140 years in which Virginia voted Democratic while Florida voted Republican. This would happen again in 2020 and 2024.

Trump was the first ever Republican to win without Harrisonburg, Manassas, and Manassas Park. Trump became the first Republican to win the White House without carrying Prince William County and Hopewell since Dwight D. Eisenhower in 1952, as well as the first to do so without carrying Loudoun County since Herbert Hoover in 1928, and the first to do so without carrying Henrico County, Montgomery County, Staunton, and Winchester since Coolidge in 1924.

Virginia and Colorado have voted for the same presidential candidate in every election since 1996. However, this is the last time where Virginia would vote to the left of Colorado.

=== Voter demographics ===
Voter demographic data was collected by CNN. The voter survey is based on exit polls. There were 2942 total respondents.

2016 Virginia presidential election (CNN)
Demographic subgroup	Clinton	Trump	% of total vote
Ideology
Liberals	85	11	26
Moderates	58	36	40
Conservatives	12	83	33
Party
Democrats	92	6	40
Republicans	6	88	33
Independents	43	48	26
Age
18–24 years old	51	38	9
25–29 years old	57	34	9
30–39 years old	55	37	16
40–49 years old	51	45	21
50–64 years old	45	52	30
65 and older	45	52	16
Gender
Men	43	52	47
Women	56	39	53
Marital status
Married	44	52	59
Unmarried	54	36	41
Marital status by gender
Married men	40	56	29
Married women	47	48	30
Unmarried men	46	42	17
Unmarried women	61	32	23
Race/ethnicity
White	35	59	67
Black	88	9	21
Latino	65	30	6
Asian	N/A	N/A	3
Other	N/A	N/A	3
Gender by race
White men	29	65	32
White women	41	54	35
Black men	84	13	9
Black women	91	7	12
Latino men (of any race)	N/A	N/A	3
Latino women (of any race)	N/A	N/A	3
Other racial/ethnic groups	62	30	6
Education
Never attended college	44	52	14
Some college education	44	51	31
College graduate	51	44	31
Advanced degree	61	33	23
Education by race
White college graduated	45	49	38
White no college degree	24	71	29
Non-white college graduates	78	17	16
Non-white no college degree	81	16	16
Education by gender/race
White women with college degrees	50	44	21
White women without college degrees	29	66	15
White men with college degrees	40	54	17
White men without college degrees	19	75	15
Non-white	79	16	33
Income
Under $50K	53	41	30
$50K-$100K	47	49	30
$100K or more	51	44	40
Issue regarded as most important
Foreign policy	67	26	11
Immigration	27	68	10
Economy	52	41	56
Terrorism	45	53	20
Region
D.C. Suburbs	68	27	19
Northern Virginia exurbs	48	46	17
Central/ west Virginia	31	64	21
Richmond/ east	50	44	25
Tidewater	53	42	18
Area type
Urban	59	34	30
Suburban	47	48	51
Rural	41	56	19

== See also ==
- Democratic Party of Virginia
- Republican Party of Virginia
- Libertarian Party of Virginia
- Green Party of Virginia
