= Beauharnais (disambiguation) =

Beauharnais could refer to:

- Beauharnais, a French noble family
- Beauharnais v. Illinois, a U.S. Supreme Court precedent
- Hôtel Beauharnais, a historic building in Paris, France
