= List of United States Supreme Court cases, volume 160 =

Supreme Court of the United States
- Interactive map of Supreme Court of the United States
- 38°53′26″N 77°00′16″W
- Established: March 4, 1789; 236 years ago
- Location: Washington, D.C.
- Coordinates: 38°53′26″N 77°00′16″W
- Composition method: Presidential nomination with Senate confirmation
- Authorised by: Constitution of the United States, Art. III, § 1
- Judge term length: life tenure, subject to impeachment and removal
- Number of positions: 9 (by statute)
- Website: supremecourt.gov

This is a list of cases reported in volume 160 of United States Reports, decided by the Supreme Court of the United States in 1895 and 1896.

== Justices of the Supreme Court at the time of volume 160 U.S. ==
The Supreme Court is established by Article III, Section 1 of the Constitution of the United States, which says: "The judicial Power of the United States, shall be vested in one supreme Court . . .". The size of the Court is not specified; the Constitution leaves it to Congress to set the number of justices. Under the Judiciary Act of 1789 Congress originally fixed the number of justices at six (one chief justice and five associate justices). Since 1789 Congress has varied the size of the Court from six to seven, nine, ten, and back to nine justices (always including one chief justice).

When the cases in volume 160 were decided the Court comprised the following nine members:

Portrait	Justice	Office	Home State	Succeeded	Date confirmed by the Senate (Vote)	Tenure on Supreme Court
	Melville Fuller	Chief Justice	Illinois	Morrison Waite	July 20, 1888 (41–20)	October 8, 1888 – July 4, 1910 (Died)
	Stephen Johnson Field	Associate Justice	California	newly created seat	March 10, 1863 (Acclamation)	May 10, 1863 – December 1, 1897 (Retired)
	John Marshall Harlan	Associate Justice	Kentucky	David Davis	November 29, 1877 (Acclamation)	December 10, 1877 – October 14, 1911 (Died)
	Horace Gray	Associate Justice	Massachusetts	Nathan Clifford	December 20, 1881 (51–5)	January 9, 1882 – September 15, 1902 (Died)
	David Josiah Brewer	Associate Justice	Kansas	Stanley Matthews	December 18, 1889 (53–11)	January 6, 1890 – March 28, 1910 (Died)
	Henry Billings Brown	Associate Justice	Michigan	Samuel Freeman Miller	December 29, 1890 (Acclamation)	January 5, 1891 – May 28, 1906 (Retired)
	George Shiras Jr.	Associate Justice	Pennsylvania	Joseph P. Bradley	July 26, 1892 (Acclamation)	October 10, 1892 – February 23, 1903 (Retired)
	Edward Douglass White	Associate Justice	Louisiana	Samuel Blatchford	February 19, 1894 (Acclamation)	March 12, 1894 – December 18, 1910 (Continued as chief justice)
	Rufus W. Peckham	Associate Justice	New York	Howell Edmunds Jackson	December 9, 1895 (Acclamation)	January 6, 1896 – October 24, 1909 (Died)

== Citation style ==
Under the Judiciary Act of 1789 the federal court structure at the time comprised District Courts, which had general trial jurisdiction; Circuit Courts, which had mixed trial and appellate (from the US District Courts) jurisdiction; and the United States Supreme Court, which had appellate jurisdiction over the federal District and Circuit courts—and for certain issues over state courts. The Supreme Court also had limited original jurisdiction (i.e., in which cases could be filed directly with the Supreme Court without first having been heard by a lower federal or state court). There were one or more federal District Courts and/or Circuit Courts in each state, territory, or other geographical region.

The Judiciary Act of 1891 created the United States Courts of Appeals and reassigned the jurisdiction of most routine appeals from the district and circuit courts to these appellate courts. The Act created nine new courts that were originally known as the "United States Circuit Courts of Appeals." The new courts had jurisdiction over most appeals of lower court decisions. The Supreme Court could review either legal issues that a court of appeals certified or decisions of court of appeals by writ of certiorari.

Bluebook citation style is used for case names, citations, and jurisdictions.

- "# Cir." = United States Court of Appeals
  - e.g., "3d Cir." = United States Court of Appeals for the Third Circuit
- "C.C.D." = United States Circuit Court for the District of . . .
  - e.g.,"C.C.D.N.J." = United States Circuit Court for the District of New Jersey
- "D." = United States District Court for the District of . . .
  - e.g.,"D. Mass." = United States District Court for the District of Massachusetts
- "E." = Eastern; "M." = Middle; "N." = Northern; "S." = Southern; "W." = Western
  - e.g.,"C.C.S.D.N.Y." = United States Circuit Court for the Southern District of New York
  - e.g.,"M.D. Ala." = United States District Court for the Middle District of Alabama
- "Ct. Cl." = United States Court of Claims
- The abbreviation of a state's name alone indicates the highest appellate court in that state's judiciary at the time.
  - e.g.,"Pa." = Supreme Court of Pennsylvania
  - e.g.,"Me." = Supreme Judicial Court of Maine

== List of cases in volume 160 U.S. ==
Case Name	Page and year	Opinion of the Court	Concurring opinion(s)	Dissenting opinion(s)	Lower Court	Disposition
United States v. Union Pacific Railroad Company	1 (1895)	Harlan	none	none	8th Cir.	reversed
United States v. Western Union Telegraph Company	53 (1895)	Harlan	none	none	C.C.S.D.N.Y.	affirmed
Goldsby v. United States	70 (1895)	White	none	none	C.C.W.D. Ark.	affirmed
Washington and Idaho Railway v. Coeur d'Alene Railway and Navigation Company	77 (1895)	Shiras	none	none	9th Cir.	affirmed
Washington and Idaho Railway v. Osborn	103 (1895)	Shiras	none	none	Sup. Ct. Terr. Idaho	affirmed
McCarty v. Lehigh Valley Railroad Company	110 (1895)	Brown	none	none	C.C.E.D. Pa.	affirmed
Folsom v. United States	121 (1895)	Fuller	none	none	8th Cir.	certification
Streep v. United States	128 (1895)	Gray	none	none	C.C.S.D.N.Y.	affirmed
United States v. Healey	136 (1895)	Harlan	none	none	Ct. Cl.	reversed
Bamberger v. Schoolfield	149 (1895)	White	none	none	C.C.N.D. Ala.	affirmed
New Orleans Flour Inspectors v. Glover	170 (1895)	Fuller	none	none	C.C.E.D. La.	dismissed
Townsend v. Vanderwerker	171 (1895)	Brown	none	none	Sup. Ct. D.C.	reversed
Ballew v. United States	187 (1895)	White	none	none	C.C.N.D. Ga.	reversed
Allison v. United States	203 (1895)	Fuller	none	none	C.C.W.D. Ark.	reversed
Interior Construction and Improvement Company v. Gibney	217 (1895)	Gray	none	none	C.C.D. Ind.	reversed
In Re Keasbey and Mattison Company	221 (1895)	Gray	none	none	C.C.S.D.N.Y.	mandamus denied
Whitten v. Tomlinson	231 (1895)	Gray	none	none	C.C.D. Conn.	affirmed
In re Sanford Fork and Tool Company	247 (1895)	Gray	none	none	C.C.D. Ind.	mandamus denied
Central Railroad Company v. Keegan	259 (1895)	White	none	none	2d Cir.	certification
Moore v. United States	268 (1895)	Brown	none	none	S.D. Ala.	reversed
Keane v. Brygger	276 (1895)	Field	none	none	Wash.	affirmed
Jersey City and Bergen Railroad Company v. Morgan	288 (1895)	Fuller	none	none	N.J. Sup. Ct.	dismissed
Kohl v. Lehlback	293 (1895)	Fuller	none	none	C.C.D.N.J.	affirmed
Haws v. Victoria Copper Mining Company	303 (1895)	White	none	none	Sup. Ct. Terr. Utah	affirmed
Markham v. United States	319 (1895)	Harlan	none	none	D. Ky.	affirmed
Lehigh Mining and Manufacturing Company v. Kelly	327 (1895)	Harlan	none	Shiras	C.C.W.D. Va.	affirmed
Pierce v. United States	355 (1896)	Brown	none	none	C.C.W.D. Ark.	affirmed
Bartlett v. Lockwood	357 (1896)	Brown	none	none	N.Y. Sup. Ct.	dismissed
Van Wagenen v. Sewall	369 (1896)	Brown	none	none	N.D. Fla.	dismissed
Union Mutual Life Insurance Company v. Kirchoff	374 (1896)	Brown	none	none	Ill.	dismissed
Kirby v. Tallmadge	379 (1896)	Brown	none	none	Sup. Ct. D.C.	affirmed
Iowa Central Railway Company v. Iowa	389 (1896)	White	none	none	Iowa	dismissed
Spalding v. Chandler	394 (1896)	White	none	none	Mich.	affirmed
Hickory v. United States	408 (1896)	White	none	none	C.C.W.D. Ark.	reversed
Gill v. United States	426 (1896)	Brown	none	none	Ct. Cl.	affirmed
Southern Pacific Railroad Company v. Pool	438 (1896)	White	none	none	Sup. Ct. Terr. Utah	reversed
Eldridge v. Trezevant	452 (1896)	Shiras	none	none	C.C.W.D. La.	affirmed
Davis v. United States	469 (1895)	Harlan	none	none	C.C.W.D. Ark.	reversed
United States v. Sayward	493 (1895)	Harlan	none	none	C.C.D. Wash.	reversed
Chappell v. United States	499 (1896)	Gray	none	none	D. Md.	affirmed
Jacksonville, Mayport, Pablo Railway and Navigation Company v. Hooper	514 (1896)	Shiras	none	none	C.C.N.D. Fla.	affirmed
Laing v. Rigney	531 (1896)	Shiras	none	none	N.Y. Sup. Ct.	reversed
Johnson v. United States	546 (1896)	Brewer	none	none	Ct. Cl.	affirmed
Carver v. United States	553 (1896)	Fuller	none	none	C.C.W.D. Ark.	reversed
Missouri Pacific Railroad Company v. Fitzgerald	556 (1896)	Fuller	none	none	Neb.	dismissed
Dickson v. Patterson	584 (1896)	Harlan	none	none	C.C.D. Neb.	reversed
United States v. Fuller	593 (1896)	Brown	none	none	Ct. Cl.	affirmed
United States v. New York	598 (1896)	Harlan	none	none	Ct. Cl.	reversed
Nalle v. Young	624 (1896)	Fuller	none	none	C.C.W.D. La.	reversed
Gregory v. Van Ee	643 (1896)	Fuller	none	none	1st Cir.	dismissed
Chemical National Bank v. City Bank	646 (1896)	Fuller	none	none	Ill.	dismissed
United States v. Thornton	654 (1896)	Brown	none	none	Ct. Cl.	reversed
First National Bank v. Ayers	660 (1896)	Peckham	none	none	Kan.	affirmed
United States v. Gettysburg Electric Railway Company	668 (1896)	Peckham	none	none	C.C.E.D. Pa.	reversed
Sioux City and St. Paul Railroad Company v. United States	686 (1896)	Harlan	none	none	C.C.N.D. Iowa	rehearing denied
Missouri v. Iowa	688 (1896)	Fuller	none	none	original	boundary adjusted

== See also ==
- Certificate of division
