= Ray v. Blair =

- Supreme Court of the United States

Argued March 31, 1952 Decided April 3, 1952
- Full case name: Ray, Chairman of the State Democratic Executive Committee of Alabama v. Edmund Blair
- Citations: 343 U.S. 214 (more) 72 S. Ct. 654; 96 L. Ed. 894; 1952 U.S. LEXIS 2246

Case history
- Prior: 57 So.2d 395 (Ala. 1952); cert. granted, 343 U.S. 901 (1952).

Holding
- Ray could not be forced to certify Blair if Blair refused to pledge to vote for a certain candidate.

Court membership
- Chief Justice Fred M. Vinson Associate Justices Hugo Black · Stanley F. Reed; Felix Frankfurter · William O. Douglas; Robert H. Jackson · Harold H. Burton; Tom C. Clark · Sherman Minton

Case opinions
- Majority: Reed, joined by Vinson, Burton, Clark, Minton
- Dissent: Jackson, joined by Douglas
- Black and Frankfurter took no part in the consideration or decision of the case.

Laws applied
- U.S. Const. amends. XII, XIV

Ray v. Blair, 343 U.S. 214 (1952), is a major decision of the Supreme Court of the United States. It was a case on state political parties' requiring of presidential electors to pledge to vote for the party's nominees before being certified as electors. It ruled that it is constitutional for states to allow parties to require such a pledge of their candidates for elector, and that it was not a breach of otherwise qualified candidates' rights to be denied this position if they refused the pledge. However, the violation of any pledge a faithless elector made was not at issue. It officially defined state electors as representatives of their respective states, not the federal government. The case was argued on March 31, 1952 and the Court announced its decision on April 3, 1952; the majority and dissenting opinions were issued on April 15, 1952.

== Background ==
Ben F. Ray, Chairman of the Alabama Executive Committee of the Democratic Party, had the duty of certifying elector candidates for Alabama's state Democratic Primaries. Ray refused to certify Edmund Blair as an elector because, while Blair was qualified for the position in all other regards, he had refused to take a pledge that promised, in part, he would support "the nominees of the National Convention of the Democratic Party for President and Vice-President of the United States." While it was not the law that electors had to take such a pledge, the executive committees of the political parties had the statutory right to set the criteria for determining who would be certified as electors in their primaries. Pursuant to this law, the Democratic Party had determined the above-excerpted pledge was a requirement for certification.

A writ of mandamus was issued to force Ray to certify Blair as an elector, despite the fact that he had not fulfilled the requirements the party had set forth. The Supreme Court of Alabama upheld the writ, reasoning, on federal constitutional grounds – specifically the Twelfth Amendment – that the requirement improperly restricted the freedom of electors to vote their choice in state primaries. Based on the fact that the state supreme court ruling cited the federal Constitution, the Supreme Court granted certiorari.

== The decision ==
The Supreme Court overturned the decision of the Alabama Supreme Court.

The Court reasoned that, first of all, the federal judiciary has jurisdiction in the matter because, while state electors are not federal officers, they are performing a federal function in assisting to determine the outcome of national elections. The state has the authority to oversee them, and, in doing this, the state acts under the authority from the Federal Constitution.

Further, the Court determined that a state is within its rights to exclude, or to allow parties to exclude, potential electors on the basis of refusing to pledge to support the party's nominees. This is acceptable because it is a method of ensuring that party candidates in the general election are committed to the leadership and philosophy of the party.

Finally, the Supreme Court decided that the Twelfth Amendment doesn't prevent parties from requiring elector candidates to take a pledge of nominee support. Further, the requirement of a pledge does not deny equal protection under the Fourteenth Amendment. However, it did not address the requirement that electors must vote for their pledged candidate.

The opinion of the Court was delivered by Justice Reed.

== Dissent ==
Justice Jackson wrote forcefully in his dissent "no one faithful to our history can deny that the plan originally contemplated what is implicit in its text – that electors would be free agents, to exercise an independent and nonpartisan judgment as to the men best qualified for the Nation's highest offices."

== See also ==
- List of United States Supreme Court cases, volume 343
- Chiafalo v. Washington – another Supreme Court case upholding enforcement of electoral pledges
