= FTC v. Ruberoid Co. =

Federal Trade Commission v. Ruberoid Co.
- Supreme Court of the United States

Argued March 31, April 1, 1952 Decided May 26, 1952
- Full case name: Federal Trade Commission v. Ruberoid Company
- Docket no.: 448 and 504.html Nos. 448 and 504
- Citations: 343 U.S. 470 (more) 72 S. Ct. 800; 96 L. Ed. 1081

Case history
- Prior: FTC order modified and enforced in part, 189 F.2d 893 (2d Cir. 1951)
- Subsequent: None

Holding
- The Federal Trade Commission has broad discretion to fashion cease-and-desist orders under the Clayton Act, and reviewing courts should not modify or deny enforcement of the Commission's chosen remedy unless it bears no reasonable relation to the unlawful practices found.

Court membership
- Chief Justice Fred M. Vinson Associate Justices Hugo Black · Stanley F. Reed; Felix Frankfurter · William O. Douglas; Robert H. Jackson · Harold H. Burton; Tom C. Clark · Sherman Minton

Case opinions
- Majority: Clark, joined by Vinson, Reed, Burton, Minton
- Concurrence: Jackson, joined by Frankfurter
- Dissent: Douglas, joined by Black

Laws applied
- Clayton Act § 2(a), 15 U.S.C. § 13(a); Robinson–Patman Act

Federal Trade Commission v. Ruberoid Co., 343 U.S. 470 (1952), was a decision of the Supreme Court of the United States holding that the Federal Trade Commission has broad discretion to fashion cease and desist orders for violations of the Robinson–Patman Act, and that reviewing courts should not modify or deny enforcement of the Commission's chosen remedy unless it bears no reasonable relation to the unlawful practices found.

== Background ==
The Federal Trade Commission found that the Ruberoid Company had discriminated in the prices charged to competing purchasers in violation of § 2(a) of the Clayton Act, as amended by the Robinson–Patman Act. The case concerned the scope of that cease-and-desist order Section 2(a) prohibited price discrimination only where the effect "may be substantially to lessen competition," create a monopoly, or injure competition.

The Commission concluded that the price discriminations "may be substantially to lessen competition" and issued a cease-and-desist order.

Before Ruberoid, the federal courts of appeals were divided over the procedures governing enforcement of Federal Trade Commission cease-and-desist orders. The United States Court of Appeals for the Seventh Circuit held that proof of a violation of an FTC order was a prerequisite to judicial enforcement, requiring the issue to be resolved before the court could review the order's validity. By contrast, the United States Court of Appeals for the Second Circuit and the United States Court of Appeals for the Fourth Circuit first reviewed the validity of the order and referred the question of compliance to the Commission only after affirming it. On review, the United States Court of Appeals for the Second Circuit affirmed the order against Ruberoid and initially granted its enforcement, but later amended its mandate to remove the enforcement decree. The Supreme Court granted certiorari to resolve questions concerning the scope and enforcement of FTC orders issued under the Clayton Act.

== Supreme Court ==
In Ruberoid, the Second Circuit initially affirmed the Commission's order and granted enforcement, but later acknowledged that the enforcement portion of its mandate had been issued in error. The Supreme Court affirmed, holding that the Commission was required to establish a violation of its order before obtaining judicial enforcement.

=== Ruberoid's arguments ===
Ruberoid argued that the FTC's cease-and-desist order was overly broad in three respects. First, it contended that the order improperly prohibited all price differentials between competing purchasers even though the Commission had found violations involving discounts of 5 percent or more. Second, it argued that the order should have been limited to sales involving retailers and roofing contractors, rather than all competing purchasers, because the Commission had found insufficient evidence of discrimination among wholesalers. Finally, Ruberoid asserted that the order unlawfully prohibited price differences justified by statutory defenses, such as cost justification and good-faith efforts to meet a competitor's price, because those exceptions were not expressly included in the order. The Supreme Court rejected each argument, holding that the Commission had broad discretion to fashion remedies reasonably related to the unlawful practices found and that the statutory defenses were implicit in every order issued under the Robinson–Patman Act.

=== FTC's arguments ===
The FTC argued that the court of appeals should have enforced its cease-and-desist order upon affirming it, even without proof that Ruberoid had violated or was about to violate the order. It contended that the Clayton Act's requirement that a respondent "fails or neglects to obey" an order merely limited when the Commission could seek enforcement, not when a court could grant it. Alternatively, the Commission argued that the statutory requirement of noncompliance applied only when the FTC independently petitioned for enforcement, and not when it sought enforcement by cross-petition after a respondent had petitioned for judicial review. The Supreme Court rejected both arguments, holding that the Clayton Act required proof of an actual or imminent violation before a court could enter an enforcement decree, regardless of which party initiated judicial review.

=== Majority opinion ===
The decision upheld the FTC's use of the so-called "Ruberoid order," a form of cease-and-desist order adopted by the Commission in 1950 that prohibited all net price differentials between competing purchasers without expressly referring to the statutory defenses under the Robinson–Patman Act or the Act's competitive injury requirement. The Court held that the statutory defenses of cost justification and good-faith meeting of competition were nevertheless implicit in every order issued under § 2(a) of the Clayton Act. Those defenses remained available where a seller's pricing arose from a new competitive situation involving materially different circumstances, but could not be invoked to relitigate issues that had already been resolved by the Commission or could have been raised during the original administrative proceedings.

=== Justice Jackson's dissent ===
In his dissenting opinion, Justice Robert H. Jackson described the rise of administrative agencies as "probably ... the most significant legal trend of the last century," observing that they affected "more values today ... than ... all the courts, review of administrative decisions apart." He nevertheless warned of a growing "malaise in the administrative scheme," reflecting concerns about the expanding role and structure of the federal administrative state.

Jackson's observations were later cited by Judge Henry Friendly in his discussion of the need for clearer statutory standards governing federal administrative agencies. Friendly argued that, although the Administrative Procedure Act of 1946 had temporarily eased concerns about the administrative state, criticism intensified following the 1958 investigations by the House Subcommittee on Legislative Oversight, leading to renewed calls for reform of federal regulatory agencies.

Jackson also described administrative agencies as "a veritable fourth branch of the Government" that had "deranged our three-branch legal theories much as the concept of a fourth dimension unsettles our three-dimensional thinking," adding that "all recognized classifications have broken down." He observed that agencies had been characterized as "quasi-legislative," "quasi-executive," or "quasi-judicial" to accommodate their functions within the constitutional separation of powers, but argued that the resort to the qualifier "quasi" reflected the breakdown of traditional separation of powers:

The mere retreat to the qualifying "quasi" is implicit with confession that all recognized classifications have broken down, and "quasi" is a smooth cover which we draw over our confusion as we might use a counterpane to cover a disordered bed.

== Works cited ==
- Kauper, Thomas E. (1966). "FTC v. Jantzen: Blessing, Disaster, or Tempest in a Teapot?". Michigan Law Review. 64 (8): 1523–1543.
