= Davis v. United States (1895) =

- Supreme Court of the United States

Submitted October 30, 1895 Decided December 16, 1895
- Full case name: Davis v. United States
- Citations: 160 U.S. 469 (more) 16 S. Ct. 353; 40 L. Ed. 499; 1895 U.S. LEXIS 2370

Court membership
- Chief Justice Melville Fuller Associate Justices Stephen J. Field · John M. Harlan; Horace Gray · David J. Brewer; Henry B. Brown · George Shiras Jr. Edward D. White

Case opinion
- Majority: Harlan, joined by unanimous

Davis v. United States, 160 U.S. 469 (1895), is a criminal case establishing that in a federal case, the prosecution bears the burden of proof of sanity if an insanity defense is raised. It is a common law ruling that sets precedent in federal court, but is not a constitutional ruling interpreting the United States Constitution, so does not preclude states from requiring defendants to prove insanity, even to the point of requiring defendants to prove insanity beyond a reasonable doubt, as in Leland v. Oregon (1951).
