= Leland v. Oregon =

- Supreme Court of the United States

Argued January 29, 1952 Decided June 9, 1952
- Full case name: Leland v. Oregon
- Citations: 343 U.S. 790 (more) 72 S. Ct. 1002; 96 L. Ed. 1302; 1952 U.S. LEXIS 1955

Case history
- Prior: Appeal from the Supreme Court of Oregon

Holding
- The Court upheld the constitutionality of placing the burden of persuasion on the defendant when they argue an insanity defense in a criminal trial.

Court membership
- Chief Justice Fred M. Vinson Associate Justices Hugo Black · Stanley F. Reed; Felix Frankfurter · William O. Douglas; Robert H. Jackson · Harold H. Burton; Tom C. Clark · Sherman Minton

Case opinions
- Majority: Clark, joined by Vinson, Reed, Douglas, Jackson, Burton, Minton
- Dissent: Frankfurter, joined by Black

Leland v. Oregon, 343 U.S. 790 (1952), was a United States Supreme Court case in which the Court upheld the constitutionality of placing the burden of persuasion on the defendant when they argue an insanity defense in a criminal trial. This differed from previous federal common law established in Davis v. United States, in which the court held that if the defense raised an insanity defense, the prosecution must prove sanity beyond a reasonable doubt, but Davis was not a United States constitutional ruling, so only limited federal cases, but not state cases. Oregon had a very high burden on defense, that insanity be proved beyond a reasonable doubt. At that time, twenty other states also placed the burden of persuasion on the defense for an insanity defense.

The defendant was convicted of killing a fifteen-year-old girl in Multnomah County. After being arrested for auto theft, the defendant asked for a homicide officer, verbally confessed to the murder, took the police to the scene of the crime, and signed a written confession. After being indicted, he then spoke to a lawyer for the first time. At trial, a jury convicted him and recommended the death penalty.

Oregon law required the defendant required proof of insanity beyond a reasonable doubt. The case claimed that the "statute in effect requires a defendant pleading insanity to establish his innocence by disproving beyond a reasonable doubt elements of the crime necessary to a verdict of guilty, and that the statute is therefore violative of that due process of law secured by the Fourteenth Amendment."
