= Robertson v. United States =

- Supreme Court of the United States

Argued March 31, 1952 Decided June 2, 1952
- Full case name: Robertson v. United States
- Citations: 343 U.S. 711 (more) 72 S. Ct. 994; 96 L. Ed. 1237; 1952 U.S. LEXIS 2809

Case history
- Prior: Judgment for plaintiff, 93 F. Supp. 660 (D. Utah 1950); reversed, 190 F.2d 680 (10th Cir. 1951); cert. granted, 342 U.S. 896 (1951).

Holding
- That cash contest prizes are taxable, and attributable to the most-recent 36 months ending with the close of the year in which it was received

Court membership
- Chief Justice Fred M. Vinson Associate Justices Hugo Black · Stanley F. Reed; Felix Frankfurter · William O. Douglas; Robert H. Jackson · Harold H. Burton; Tom C. Clark · Sherman Minton

Case opinions
- Majority: Douglas, joined by Black, Reed, Burton, Clark, Minton
- Dissent: Jackson
- Frankfurter took no part in the consideration or decision of the case.

Laws applied
- Internal Revenue Code

Robertson v. United States, 343 U.S. 711 (1952), was a United States Supreme Court case in which the Court held that cash contest prizes are taxable, and attributable to the most-recent thirty-six months ending with the close of the year in which it was received.

== Background ==
The facts of the case involve American composer Leroy Robertson entering a previously composed symphony, Trilogy, into a 1947 contest for musical compositions. Robertson won $25,000, claimed the prize on his income taxes as income attributable to the three years he wrote it (1937 through 1939), and thereafter claimed a refund that treated his winnings as a gift.

The case is notable, and thus appears in law school casebooks, for the following holdings:

- A cash prize received by the winner of a contest in musical composition is "gross income" within the meaning of § 22(a) of the Internal Revenue Code, and it is not a "gift" excluded from gross income by § 22(b)(3).
- In computing under § 107(b), the tax on such a cash prize for a musical composition, the income should be attributed to the 36 months ending with the close of the year in which it was received—not some earlier period of 36 months during which the taxpayer worked on the composition.
