= Polly Baca =

American politician

Member of the Colorado Senate from the 25th district
- In office January 10, 1979 – January 14, 1987

Member of the Colorado House of Representatives from the 34th district
- In office 1974 – January 10, 1979

Personal details
- Born: February 13, 1941 (age 85) Greeley, Colorado
- Party: Democratic
- Spouse: Miguel Barragan (divorced)
- Profession: Political

Polly Baca (born February 13, 1941) is an American politician who served as Chair of the Democratic Caucus of the Colorado House of Representatives (1976–79), being the first woman to hold that office and the first Hispanic woman elected to the Colorado State Senate and in the House and Senate of a state Legislature.

She also was the first to co-chair a National Democratic Convention. She was a member of the Colorado State Legislature for 12 years and was elected to the Colorado Senate in 1978. She was also the founder and director of the Latin American Research and Service Agency (LARASA), as well as its president and CEO. She founded the LARASA nonprofit organization in 1964 "to lead and influence change to improve the quality of life for Latinos through advocacy, capacity building, and education."

In addition, she's currently the president and CEO of "Baca Barragan & Perez Associates", "a consulting firm specializing in political campaigns, multicultural leadership development, diversity training, motivational presentations, policy analysis and development, and government relations." and still remains active in her community working on behalf of local and national issues important to low income Americans. She also continues to help with issues on civil rights, political campaigns and consulting with companies and organizations on developing multicultural relations programs.

== Early years ==
Polly Baca-Barragán was born in Weld County, Colorado, in 1941. She is the daughter of José Manuel Baca and Leda Sierra Baca, descendants of the Spanish and Mexican colonists of New Mexico and Colorado, who arrived there in the 1600s. Her parents were farm workers, but later her father worked for an ice storage company, while her mother worked in fishhook and potato chip factories. In addition, her father was the first head of their church's credit union, which helped the parishioners with small loans. Polly has two sisters: Fernie, now a retired Dean from the University of Colorado, and Bettie Baca, a consultant in Washington, DC. Her great-grandfather helped found Trinidad, Colorado.

When she was three years old, the Baca family moved to Greeley, Colorado, a community that allowed segregated churches, theaters, and business establishments. Mexicans and Mexican Americans were separated from the mainstream community. At three years of age, Baca experienced segregation in church that contribute to her future political ideology.

She graduated from Colorado State University, with a Bachelor of Arts in political science. During her freshman year at the University, she studied physics, but because she belonged to many political organizations, a professor suggested she change her major to political science, something which she accepted.

== Early political career ==
She plunged into campus politics, taking the vice presidency, and later the presidency, of the "Young Democrats" of the university and CSU; she was also secretary for her freshman class. Active as a volunteer for congressional campaigns, Baca-Barragán was a student chairman of the Colorado Viva Kennedy Campaign for John F. Kennedy and worked as an intern for the Colorado Democratic Party.

After receiving her BA in political science in 1962, Baca-Barragán was recruited to work as an editorial assistant for a trade union newspaper in Washington DC. In 1966, Baca worked for the Brotherhood of Railway and Airline Clerks and was encouraged to help organize the Huelga Committee to support the farmworkers' movement. Shortly after, in 1967, she was recruited to work for President Lyndon Johnson's administration as a public information officer for a White House Interagency Committee about Mexican Americans. She ended this charge in 1968.

In June 1968 she joined the staff of the national campaign of the late Senator Robert F. Kennedy in his bid to become President of the United States. So, she helped organize Viva Kennedy Campaign, which was focusing on east Los Angeles. She was staying at the Ambassador Hotel in this city. After the John F. Kennedy death, she helped civil rights activist César Chavez, to the California memorial march organized for farmworkers to help the politic campaign of senator and to control access to the Kennedy's burial site. That same year she served as the director of research and information for the National Council of La Raza in Phoenix, Arizona.

A few years later, adding to a long list of "firsts", Polly became an assistant to the Chairman of the Democratic National Committee. Shortly after, she opened a public relations business in Adams County after returning to Colorado, where her professional experiences blossomed into her political career. She worked on civil rights campaigns, organized committees and she was also the executive director of the Southwest Council of La Raza, which she received a $600,000 grant to address the education and economic issues of Mexican-Americans in urban areas. In addition, she became also Special Assistant to the DNC Chairman. She also participated voluntarily in Escuela deGuadalupe and Beginning Experiences and was chief executive officer of Sierra Baca Systems, a management consulting firm specializing in motivational presentations, multi-cultural leadership, and diversity training.

== Political leadership in Colorado ==
In 1974, Polly Baca-Barragán won Colorado's 34th district seat in the state's House of Representatives, and four years later she was elected to the Colorado State Legislature as the first Hispanic woman senator. In 1977, she was elected the first woman chair of the House Democratic Caucus, and in 1985, she was elected chair of the Senate Democratic caucus. She was the first minority woman to be elected to the Colorado Senate and the first Hispanic woman to serve in leadership in any State Senate in the United States. As a freshman legislator in the House of Representatives from Colorado, Baca-Barragán broke an old rule of seniority system which imposed a "watch and wait" attitude of seasonal first. In the 1975 session of the Colorado legislature, she introduced nine House bills and carried six Senate bills in the House. Two of these House bills and three of Senate bills were passed by both houses and signed into law by the governor.

Throughout her term she sponsored 201 more House bills and 57 additional Senate bills. Of these, 156 passed both houses and are now law. Some of her most notable bills are Senate Bill 118, providing for the protection of deposits of public monies held by the state and national banks (1986); Senate Bill 87, providing authority to the Colorado district courts to enforce foreign subpoenas, (1985); Senate Bill 139, concerning assessment of civil money penalties by the state banking board, (1985); House Bill 1117, continuing the short-term-loan revolving fund in the division of housing, (1985); House Bill 1336 (1985), regulating the operation of non state post-secondary institutions in Colorado by the Colorado Commission on Higher Education, and many others. In addition, she introduced legislation to protect public monies in state national banks.

In 1980 and again in 1984, she was elected Co-Chair of the Democratic National Convention and chaired the Colorado delegation to the 1978 Democratic Mid-term Conference. Baca-Barragán also gladly shared her extensive foreign affairs experience as a participant and panelist to major international conferences in Colombia, Mexico, the USSR, Israel, Egypt, Lebanon, Canada, Belgium, and West Germany. After the long campaign Baca-Barragán retired from public office and became President of Sierra Baca Systems, a consulting firm specializing in program development and evaluation, leadership training, analysis of emission, and motivational presentations. In addition, Baca-Barragán has frequently appeared as a political commentator on both television and radio.

In 1988, she was honored as one of the original 14 members to be inducted into the National Hispanic Hall of Fame and being listed in the World Who's Who of Women. Though Baca-Barragán has no political aspirations at present, she continues to be active with national civic groups and serves on a bipartisan Commission on National Political Conventions. More recently, Baca-Barragán has been devoting her time to heading up the Colorado Institute for Hispanic Education and Economic Empowerment, whose mission is to create a pool of Hispanic leaders who are sensitive to cultural differences and gender issues, and who will jump on the fast track to leadership positions. She was also the President and CEO of the Latin American Research and Service Agency (LARASA), founded 1964, for improve the quality of life for Latinos throughout Colorado with the belief that when you improve the lives of Latinos in Colorado, you improve the lives of all Coloradoans.

In addition, she was the regional administrator of the General Services Administration for the six-state Rocky Mountain Region and the executive director of the Colorado Hispanic Institute, a nonprofit organization whose aimed is promoted multicultural leadership development. In 1994, Baca was elected as special assistant to then President Bill Clinton and director of the United States Federal Trade Commission. She held again several positions in Colorado state Legislature and in the House representing Adams County and the state senate, as chief consumer advocate for the Clinton administration.

After leaving public service in 1998, Baca began a consulting firm and participated voluntarily, and to full-time, with the Center for Contemplative Living, dedicating to renewing the contemplative dimension of the Gospels in everyday life. Polly Baca also holds several honorary degrees from the University of Northern Colorado at Greeley and Wartburg College.

In 2011, Baca started to serve as the State Chair of the Colorado Democratic Party. Baca was a respondent in Supreme Court case Colorado Department of State v. Baca, a challenge to Colorado rules compelling an elector to vote for the presidential candidate who received the most votes in the state. The Court ruled unanimously that a state can enforce an elector's pledge to vote for a candidate in the associated case Chiafalo v. Washington and ruled against Baca in a per curiam opinion.

In 2014, Baca was mentioned in the Colorado Senate Joint Resolution 24 which established César Chávez day as March 31.

In 2024, Baca was a presidential elector, pledged to vote for Kamala Harris.

== Controversies ==
Baca voiced support for Andrew Romanoff in the 2010 Democratic Primary for governor. In a Westword article, she was quoted saying "Please stay away," in reference to President Obama's visit to Colorado to show support for Romanoff's opponent Michael Bennet.

Baca, alongside Michael Baca and Robert Nemanich, was a presidential elector in the 2016 general election. Colorado Law requires presidential electors to vote for the candidate who won the popular vote, which was Hillary Clinton. Michael Baca voted for John Kasich and was removed as an elector. In response, P. Baca and Nemanich voted for John Kasich.

== Personal life ==
Polly Baca met her future husband, Miguel Barragan, a Chicano activist and former priest, in the National Council of La Raza in Phoenix, Arizona, in 1968. The marriage in 1970 produced two children, Monica and Mike, before ending in divorce.

Since 2000, Baca is a certified spiritual director and has facilitated a weekly centering prayer course at the federal prison in Englewood, CO.

== Recognitions ==
- In 2000, Baca is inducted into the Colorado Women's Hall of Fame, being so one of the 14 original members of the National Hispanic Hall of Fame.
- She obtained, between many other awards, the Achievement Award from the Colorado Democratic Party, in 2006.
- Since 2020, Congressman Joe Neguse has dedicated an award titled, the Polly Baca Raíces Fuertes Community Service Award to honor committed service to Latino communities in Colorado's 2nd Congressional district.
