= 2024 Maine Question 1 =

Maine Question 1
- November 5, 2024
- Do you want to set a $5,000 limit for giving to political action committees that spend money independently to support or defeat candidates for office?

Results
Choice	Votes	%
Yes	600,191	74.91%
No	201,034	25.09%

Yes
90-100%
80-90%
70-80%
60-70%
50-60%
No
50-60%
Tie
50%

Maine Question 1, also known as the Limit Contributions to Super PACs Initiative, was a citizen-initiated referendum measure in Maine. The referendum was held on the Maine ballot during the 2024 United States elections in Maine.

== Background ==
Super PACs, or independent expenditure-only committees, are a type of political action committee that are allowed to raise and spend unlimited sums of money to promote or oppose a political candidate. Unlike normal political action committees, they are not allowed to contribute directly to the campaign of a candidate or their party.

In August 2023, citizens of Maine organized a ballot question committee, Maine Citizens to End SuperPACs, to gather enough signatures as required by the Maine Constitution to get the initiative on the ballots. In October 2023, Citizens to End SuperPACs was registered as a political action committee to support the passage of the referendum.

The initiative is worded to focus on limiting individual contributions to Super PACs, rather than limiting the spending of Super PACs on campaigns. This is an area the Supreme Court hasn't ruled on.

== Supporters ==
The initiative has received widespread support across Maine. Local newspapers such as The Morning Sentinel and The Portland Press Herald have endorsed the measure, along with current U.S. Representatives Chellie Pingree and Jared Golden.

Citizens to End SuperPACs received $1,519,338.70 in campaign contributions.

== Results ==
The initiative passed on November 5, 2024, during the 2024 United States elections. 74.9% of voters voted for the amendment, while 25.1% did not. The initiative carried every municipality in the state except for two: Dennistown Plantation where Yes and No tied, and Deblois, where No defeated Yes by two votes.

2024 Maine Question 1
Choice	Votes	%
For	600,191	74.91
Against	201,034	25.09
Total	801,225	100.00

== Legal challenge ==
Within weeks of the initiative’s passage, two Maine-based Super PACs and a Republican political operative sued to block the new law’s implementation, arguing that limits on contributions to Super PACs represent an unconstitutional infringement on free speech. In July 2025, a federal district court judge ruled in their favor, preventing Maine from enforcing the contribution limits.

The district court ruling relies on SpeechNow v. FEC, a 2010 D.C. Circuit Court ruling that declared limits on Super PAC contributions to be unconstitutional.

Immediately after the ruling, Maine Attorney General Aaron Frey and the advocacy organization Equal Citizens appealed the case to the First Circuit Court of Appeals, arguing that SpeechNow was wrongly decided. As of January, 2026, the appeal is ongoing. If successful, it could overturn the precedent set by SpeechNow, allowing Maine’s contribution limits to take effect and reviving existing limits on super PAC donations, including at the federal level.
