= List of United States Supreme Court cases, volume 343 =

This is a list of all United States Supreme Court cases from volume 343 of the United States Reports:

Case name	Citation	Date decided
Sacher v. United States	343 U.S. 1	1952
Lilly v. Comm'r	343 U.S. 90	1952
Buck v. California	343 U.S. 99	1952
Bruner v. United States	343 U.S. 112	1952
Lykes v. United States	343 U.S. 118	1952
Rutkin v. United States	343 U.S. 130	1952
United States v. Hood	343 U.S. 148	1952
Ray v. Blair	343 U.S. 154	1952
Kaufman v. Societe Internationale	343 U.S. 156	1952
United States v. Spector	343 U.S. 169	1952
Stroble v. California	343 U.S. 181	1952
Uebersee Finanz-Korporation, A. G. v. McGrath	343 U.S. 205	1952
Ray v. Blair	343 U.S. 214	1952
United States v. Atl. Mut. Ins. Co.	343 U.S. 236	1952
Beauharnais v. Illinois	343 U.S. 250	1952
Zorach v. Clauson	343 U.S. 306	1952
United States v. Or. State Med. Soc'y	343 U.S. 326	1952
Madsen v. Kinsella	343 U.S. 341	1952
Swift & Co. v. United States (1952)	343 U.S. 373	1952
Palmer Oil Corp. v. Amerada Petroleum Corp.	343 U.S. 390	1952
Dixon v. Duffy	343 U.S. 393	1952
NLRB v. Am. Nat'l Ins. Co.	343 U.S. 395	1952
Pa. Water & Power Co. v. FPC	343 U.S. 414	1952
Johansen v. United States	343 U.S. 427	1952
Besser Mfg. Co. v. United States	343 U.S. 444	1952
Public Utilities Commission v. Pollak	343 U.S. 451	1952
FTC v. Ruberoid Co.	343 U.S. 470	1952
Joseph Burstyn, Inc. v. Wilson	343 U.S. 495	1952
Stembridge v. Georgia	343 U.S. 541	1952
Thompson v. United States (1952)	343 U.S. 549	1952
United States v. Great N. R. Co.	343 U.S. 562	1952
Youngstown Sheet & Tube Co. v. Sawyer	343 U.S. 579	1952
Robertson v. United States	343 U.S. 711	1952
Kawakita v. United States	343 U.S. 717	1952
On Lee v. United States	343 U.S. 747	1952
Trainmen v. Howard	343 U.S. 768	1952
Isbrandtsen Co. v. Johnson	343 U.S. 779	1952
Leland v. Oregon	343 U.S. 790	1952
Casey v. United States	343 U.S. 808	1952
