= Beauharnais v. Illinois =

- Supreme Court of the United States

Argued November 28, 1951 Decided April 28, 1952
- Full case name: Beauharnais v. Illinois
- Citations: 343 U.S. 250 (more) 72 S. Ct. 725; 96 L. Ed. 919; 1952 U.S. LEXIS 2799

Case history
- Prior: Cert. to the S.Ct. of IL. The Supreme Court of Illinois sustained petitioner's conviction of a violation of Ill. Rev. Stat., 1949, c. 38 § 471, over his objection that the statute was invalid under the Fourteenth Amendment. 408 Ill. 512, 97 N.E.2d 343; cert. granted, 342 U.S. 809.

Holding
- An Illinois law making it illegal to publish or exhibit any writing or picture portraying the "depravity, criminality, unchastity, or lack of virtue of a class of citizens of any race, color, creed or religion" was constitutional.

Court membership
- Chief Justice Fred M. Vinson Associate Justices Hugo Black · Stanley F. Reed; Felix Frankfurter · William O. Douglas; Robert H. Jackson · Harold H. Burton; Tom C. Clark · Sherman Minton

Case opinions
- Majority: Frankfurter, joined by Vinson, Burton, Clark, Minton
- Dissent: Black, joined by Douglas
- Dissent: Reed, joined by Douglas
- Dissent: Douglas
- Dissent: Jackson

Laws applied
- U.S. Const. amends. I, XIV

Beauharnais v. Illinois, 343 U.S. 250 (1952), was a case that came before the United States Supreme Court in 1952. It upheld an Illinois law making it illegal to publish or exhibit any writing or picture portraying the "depravity, criminality, unchastity, or lack of virtue of a class of citizens of any race, color, creed or religion". It is most known for giving a legal basis to some degree that forms of hate speech that may be deemed to breach US libel law are not protected by the First Amendment.

The petitioner, Joseph Beauharnais, who served as the president of the White Circle League of America, a white supremacist group, had distributed a leaflet "setting forth a petition calling on the Mayor and City Council of Chicago 'to halt the further encroachment, harassment and invasion of white people, their property, neighborhoods and persons, by the Negro.'" His criminal conviction by the trial court and $200 fine was sustained by the Illinois Supreme Court, and upheld by the U.S. Supreme Court after it rejected a Fourteenth Amendment due process challenge.

In his opinion, Justice Frankfurter argued that the speech conducted by the defendant had breached libel and so was reasoned to be outside the protection of the First and Fourteenth Amendments.

In his dissenting opinion, Associate Justice Black quoted Pyrrhus of Epirus by alluding to the term Pyrrhic victory: "If minority groups hail this holding as their victory, they might consider the possible relevancy of this ancient remark: 'Another such victory and I am undone'".

== Subsequent history ==
Although Beauharnais has not been overturned, subsequent Supreme Court decisions such as New York Times Co. v. Sullivan (1964), R.A.V. v. City of St. Paul (1992), and Brandenburg v. Ohio (1969) have adopted a more speech-protective position.

== See also ==
- List of United States Supreme Court cases, volume 343
- List of United States Supreme Court cases
- List of United States Supreme Court cases by the Vinson Court
- List of United States Supreme Court cases involving the First Amendment
