= Equal Citizens =

American nonprofit

- Formation: 2016
- Founder: Lawrence Lessig
- Purpose: Promote citizen equality and reform institutions that currently defeat that equality
- Location: Washington, D.C.
- Methods: Litigation and advocacy
- Executive Director: Maia Cook
- Board of directors: Celinda Lake, Lawrence Lessig, Richard Painter, Teddy Himmler
- Website: equalcitizens.us

Equal Citizens is an American nonprofit, non-partisan group that is "dedicated to reforms that will achieve citizen equality". It was founded in late 2016 by Harvard Law professor Lawrence Lessig to continue the effort to bring about the set of reforms he proposed during his 2016 presidential campaign. As its inaugural campaign, the group launched "Electors Trust" immediately after the 2016 general election. They did this to provide free and strictly confidential legal support to any elector who wished to vote their conscience. Working together with several other groups, such as the Hamilton Electors and celebrities, the campaign resulted in the largest number of "faithless" electoral votes ever cast in a single presidential election.

Since 2016, Equal Citizens has engaged in other high-profile legal cases across the U.S. on topics ranging from altering the campaign finance system with litigation to end super PACs, to amending the presidential election system with litigation that challenges the winner-take-all system of the Electoral College, to expanding vote-by-mail access to young voters.

In 2025, Equal Citizens intervened in Dinner Table Action v. Schneider, defending a 2024 Maine ballot initiative approved by voters to limit contributions to super PACs. As of October 2025, the court case is on appeal in the US Court of Appeals for the First Circuit.

As of 2021, Equal Citizens is a coalition partner in the Declaration for American Democracy coalition advocating for the passage of the For the People Act, John Lewis Voting Rights Advancement Act, and D.C. Statehood.

Equal Citizens also hosts the podcast Another Way, hosted by Lawrence Lessig, which explores systemic flaws in American democracy while discussing avenues toward institutional reform.

== History ==
In September 2015, Lawrence Lessig announced his candidacy for the 2016 Democratic Party's presidential nomination. Lessig described his candidacy as a referendum on campaign finance reform and electoral reform legislation and he stated that, if elected, he would serve as president with these proposed reforms as legislative priorities. Specifically, the main focus of Lessig's presidency would be to pass the Citizen Equality Act which has three main objectives: (1) Equal right to vote, which includes implementing automatic voter registration and moving voting days to a national holiday; (2) equal representation, achieved through the passage of the Fair Representation Act; and (3) citizen funded elections, or public financing of congressional elections. In November 2015, Lessig ended his presidential campaign, and created Equal Citizens from the campaign infrastructure. Equal Citizens serves as the operational hub for accomplishing the reforms proposed in the Citizen Equality Act.

== Organizational overview ==
The group comprises two sister organizations: EqualCitizens.US, a 501(c)(4) organization, and Equal Citizens Foundation, a 501(c)(3) organization. EqualCitizens.US carries out grassroots advocacy campaigns, while the Equal Citizens Foundation focuses on educational and litigation projects. Both organizations aim to achieve the same mission of citizen equality.

=== Leadership ===
Lessig is the founder and president of Equal Citizens.

The following individuals currently serve as the board of directors of Equal Citizens Foundation:

- Celinda Lake (2018–present), president of Lake Research Partners
- Lawrence Lessig (2018–present), professor at Harvard Law School
- Richard Painter (2018–present), law professor at the University of Minnesota, U.S. Senate Candidate
- Teddy Himler (2026-present), Founder and General Partner at Optimist Ventures

=== Funding ===
Funding for Equal Citizens comes from small-dollar online donations and grants from philanthropic foundations. Equal Citizens does not accept funds from governments, intergovernmental organizations, political parties, or corporations.

In September 2017, Equal Citizens launched a 30-day crowdfunding campaign to fund their litigation to challenge winner-take-all in the Electoral College. In those 30 days, more than 35,000 people signed up, more than 5,000 people donated, and the crowdfunding goal of $250,000 was met several days before the deadline.

== Issue areas ==
Equal Citizens' mission is to "end the corruption of our representative democracy by restoring the core promise of citizen equality in our Constitution".

The group has three main issue areas:

- Equal Representation: citizens should be represented equally in elections through reforming the Electoral College and ending gerrymandering
- Equal Dependence: representatives should depend on citizens equally by limiting the role of big money in politics and restricting the revolving door between government and lobbyists
- Equal Freedom to Vote: citizens should have the same opportunity to vote by ending voter suppression and securing elections

== Litigation ==
Equal Citizens has been involved in several high-profile litigation projects that sought to reform the Electoral College and campaign finance, including Dinner Table Action v. Schneider, an ongoing case.

=== Equal Votes ===
Equal Votes was a legal challenge to the constitutionality of a state's ability to allocate their electoral votes in a winner-take-all basis. Lessig argued that based on the "one person, one vote" principle already articulated by the Supreme Court in Bush v. Gore, the winner-take-all system is unconstitutional—it is a violation of the Equal Protection Clause that ensures all votes must be treated equally under the law. By allocating their Electoral College votes according to winner-take-all, Equal Citizens believes states effectively discard the votes of United States citizens in the vote for president.

The Equal Votes litigation team is led by Bush v. Gore lawyer David Boies and includes attorneys from distinguished law firms across the country such as Alston & Bird and Steptoe & Johnson. The litigation strategy advisory team includes former White House chief ethics lawyer Richard Painter, and legal scholars Samuel Issacharoff and Guy-Uriel Charles.

In September 2017, Equal Citizens launched a 30-day crowdfunding campaign to raise $250,000 to fund the beginning stages of the Equal Votes project, and succeeded in meeting the funding goal before the deadline. During the campaign, the law firm of Boies, Schiller & Flexner volunteered to lead the litigation pro bono.

On February 21, 2018, under the leadership of Boies Schiller Flexner LLP, the litigation team filed four lawsuits in four states—California, Texas, Massachusetts, and South Carolina—on behalf of a diverse group of Democrats and Republicans whose votes for president do not matter in the general election under the winner-take-all system. All four cases raised constitutional claims grounded in the Fourteenth and First Amendments. In addition, the suits in Texas and South Carolina claimed the present system violates the Voting Rights Act by disenfranchising minority voters. Lessig said that he hoped one of the four cases would get to the Supreme Court "before too far into the 2020 presidential cycle". The Supreme Court denied certiorari on the Equal Vote cases in 2021.

=== Equal Electors ===
In the 2016 United States presidential election, ten electors voted or attempted to vote contrary to their pledges in the Electoral College. In Washington state, three electors were each fined $1,000 for their vote, and in Colorado, one elector was removed and two others were threatened for breaking their pledge. In 2017, Equal Citizens filed the case Baca v. Colorado Department of State on behalf of three electors in Colorado and Guerra v. Washington State Office of Administrative Hearings on behalf of the three electors who were fined by Washington State.

In explaining the litigation, Equal Citizens' chief counsel Jason Harrow argued that "the framers of the Constitution intended presidential electors to be able to exercise independent judgment in casting their votes for president of the United States". In March 2017, an administrative law judge rejected the arguments of the Washington plaintiffs. Thurston County Superior Court Judge Carol Murphy later denied their claim in December 2017. After the ruling, Harrow said that Murphy's decision did not affect Equal Citizens' goal of eventually taking the case to the U.S. Supreme Court. The Washington Supreme Court later upheld the fines. In April 2018, U.S. District Court Senior Judge Wiley Y. Daniel rejected the Colorado plaintiffs' case, declaring that they lacked standing. Equal Citizens appealed the judge's decision, and a three-judge panel of the United States Court of Appeals for the Tenth Circuit ruled 2–1 in favor of the electors, finding that Colorado's faithless elector law is unconstitutional. The Washington electors further appealed their case to the U.S. Supreme Court, while Colorado also appealed the decision of the Tenth Circuit. On January 17, 2020, the Supreme Court agreed to hear both cases during the 2019–2020 term. On July 6, 2020, the Court ruled unanimously against the electors, deciding that states have the power to force electors to follow the state's popular vote. Lessig said following the decision:

When we launched these cases, we did it because regardless of the outcome, it was critical to resolve this question before it created a constitutional crisis. We have achieved that. Obviously, we don't believe the Court has interpreted the constitution correctly. But we are happy that we have achieved our primary objective—this uncertainty has been removed. That is progress.

=== End Super PACs ===
Equal Citizens has been a party to three lawsuits challenging unlimited contributions to super PACs: Alaska Public Offices Commission v. Patrick, et al. in Alaska, Herrmann v. Attorney General in Massachusetts, and Dinner Table Action v. Schneider in Maine.

==== Alaska Public Offices Commission v. Patrick, et al. ====
Alaskan law limits contributions to independent political groups. But these limits are no longer enforced because of a federal court decision, SpeechNOW.org v. FEC. Alaska, however, permits residents to file a lawsuit if the state election management body, the Alaska Public Offices Commission, is not enforcing its election law. Under these rules, on January 31, 2018, Equal Citizens brought a complaint on behalf of three Alaska citizens, including James Barnett, a former Anchorage municipal politician, claiming the Alaska Public Offices Commission did not enforce the law by letting two Alaskan super PACs accept contributions greater than the amount stipulated by Alaska law. The two super PACs involved were Interior Voters for John Coghill, an outside group that supported the election of Republican state Senate majority leader John Coghill, and Working Families of Alaska. The goal was to relitigate the federal court decision SpeechNOW.org v. FEC that created the legal entity of super PACs.

The case reached the Alaska Supreme Court, which ultimately ruled that contribution limits are unconstitutional when enforced against independent expenditure groups.

==== Hermann v. Attorney General ====
In 2022, Equal Citizens, along with Free Speech for People, advanced a Massachusetts ballot initiative to limit political contributions by a single person or entity to $5,000 per year.

The Massachusetts Attorney General rejected the initiative, preventing it from moving forward for consideration by the state legislature or inclusion on the 2024 ballot. The Attorney General’s Office argued that the initiative represented an unconstitutional violation of free speech. Equal Citizens and Free Speech for People filed a lawsuit appealing the rejection. The case was eventually ruled moot by the Supreme Judicial Court of Massachusetts due to the lack of signatures required to support the petition.

==== Dinner Table Action v. Schneider ====
In 2024, a citizen-initiated referendum was put on the Maine ballot to write a $5,000 limit on Super PAC contributions into state law. In November, the referendum passed with 74.9% of voters approving. Within weeks, two Maine-based Super PACs filed a lawsuit, Dinner Table Action v. Schneider, in Maine’s federal District Court challenging the new law and arguing that any limits on Super PAC contributions were unconstitutional per the legal precedent set by SpeechNow v. FEC. Equal Citizens intervened in the case in early 2025, joining Maine Attorney General Aaron Frey to defend the law.

From the start, DTA v. Schneider was intended as a test case aimed at overturning SpeechNow, which Equal Citizens argues misinterprets the U.S. Supreme Court’s narrower ruling in Citizens United v. FEC. Equal Citizens’ legal strategy explicitly upholds Citizens United, which concerns only expenditures made by Super PACs, and upholds contribution limits as a legitimate governmental interest in preventing quid pro quo corruption.

In the District Court, the plaintiffs offered the same argument used in previous challenges to contribution limits: that if unlimited corporate spending to support or oppose political candidates was protected under the First Amendment, then unlimited contributions to Super PACs were, too. District court Judge Karen Frink Wolf ruled in favor of the Maine-based Super PACs, blocking the law from taking effect, but also recognized in her opinion that contributions to super PACs can be the “quid” in a quid pro quo arrangement — the first time a court had explicitly recognized this risk.

In July 2025, Equal Citizens and the state of Maine appealed the District Court ruling to the First District Court of Appeals, advancing the argument that SpeechNow v. FEC was wrongly decided and should be overturned — a result that would allow both states and Congress to reinstate limits on Super PAC contributions.

Equal Citizens’ position was supported in several amicus briefs, including from organizations such as the Brennan Center for Justice, the Center for American Progress, the Campaign Legal Center, the Citizens for Responsibility and Ethics in Washington (CREW), Mainers for Working Families, Dēmos, and Common Cause. Legal scholars Albert Alschuler, Laurence Tribe, and Norman Eisen filed an amicus brief, as well as investors and entrepreneurs like Mark Cuban, William von Mueffling, Steve Jurvetson, Vin Ryan, and Reid Hoffman.

A number of Republican and Democratic former members of Congress and former state governors signed as well, including Charles Boustany, Arne Carlson, Jim Gerlach, Jim Greenwood, Bob Inglis, John McKernan, Connie Morella, Reid Ribble, Claudine Schneider, Chris Shays, Olympia Snowe, Zach Wamp, Tom Daschle, Byron Dorgan, Russ Feingold, Dick Gephardt, Dan Glickman, Paul Hodes, Ron Kind, Mel Levine, Tim Roemer, Karen Shepherd, Mark Udall, and Tim Wirth.

Equal Citizens’ litigation team is led by Bush v. Gore lawyer and former Acting Solicitor General of the United States Neal Kumar Katyal from the law firm Milbank LLP.

Currently, Dinner Table Action v. Schneider remains on appeal in the First Circuit.

== Campaigns ==
=== Elector's Trust ===
In December 2016 Lawrence Lessig, Mark Lemley, and Michael Hawley established The Electors Trust with the backing of Equal Citizens, to provide pro bono legal counsel and a secure, anonymous communications platform for the 538 members of the United States Electoral College who could potentially become faithless electors to prevent the election of Donald Trump in the 2016 presidential election. The goal of the organization was also to help electors determine whether there was sufficient support to prevent Donald Trump's election. In December 2016, Lessig claimed that there were between 20 and 30 Republican electors considering voting against Trump.

The Electors Trust offered counsel through California law firm Durie Tangri. On December 15, 2016, Lessig told reporters that The Electors Trust had spent $20,000 for security for its lawyers due to threats from Trump supporters.

Lessig and The Electors Trust represented Christopher Suprun, an elector from Texas, who announced he would vote against Donald Trump regardless of how his state voted.

Working together with several other groups such as the Hamilton Electors as well as celebrities, the campaign resulted in seven "faithless" electoral votes, the most ever cast in a single presidential election. However, five of these seven faithless electors defected from voting for Hillary Clinton, while two of these seven faithless electors were pledged for Trump. This meant that the campaign fell 35 faithless Trump electors short of the 37 needed to potentially change the outcome.

=== Amending the CLASSICS Act ===
In June 2018, Equal Citizens launched an advocacy campaign partnered with Demand Progress, the EFF, Public Knowledge, and the Internet Archive to pressure Congress to change provisions in the Compensating Legacy Artists for their Songs, Service, and Important Contributions to Society Act (The CLASSICS Act). Their main demand, articulated in a letter to the Senate Judiciary Committee, was to add a registration requirement to any copyright extension, so as to allow unregistered works to pass into the public domain.

=== Creative Democracy Contest ===
In May 2018, Equal Citizens, in partnership with musician Bassnectar and the electronic music festival Electric Forest, launched the Creative Democracy Contest, in which online users could enter art depicting facts about American democracy for prizes. Judges for the contest included Lawrence Lessig, actress Bridgit Mendler, and artist Sebastian Wahl.
