= Marjorie Lansing =

American political scientist

- Born: April 2, 1916; Geneva, Florida
- Died: May 1, 1998 (aged 82); Ann Arbor, Michigan
- Education: Florida State College for Women; Columbia University; University of Michigan
- Known for: Developing the idea of a voting gender gap
- Spouse: John Lansing
- Scientific career
- Fields: Political science
- Workplaces: Eastern Michigan University

Marjorie J. Lansing (née Tillis; April 2, 1916 – May 1, 1998) was an American political scientist and activist. She developed and popularized the idea of a gender gap in voting, in which certain candidates or issues tend to receive different levels of support from women as they do from men. She was a professor of political science at Eastern Michigan University in the 1970s and 1980s, and she taught the first course in women's studies at Eastern Michigan University. Lansing ran for a number of different public offices in Michigan.

== Education and positions ==
Lansing was born on April 2, 1916, in Geneva, Florida, and she grew up on a cattle ranch. She attended the Florida State College for Women, and then became a high school teacher in Sanford, Florida.

After working as a teacher for a few years, Lansing became a graduate student at Columbia University, obtaining a master's degree in sociology in 1940. She then became a researcher in Washington, D.C., and worked for the Kilgore Sucbomittee on Antitrust and Monopolies of the United States Senate Committee on the Judiciary, as well as for the Business and Professional Women's Foundation. While in D.C., she married the economist John Lansing. The two moved to Cambridge, Massachusetts, where John Lansing completed his PhD, before he became a professor at the University of Michigan and they moved to Ann Arbor. Marjorie Lansing attended the University of Michigan as a PhD student beginning in 1961, while also teaching at Eastern Michigan University. During this time Lansing had three children. She completed her PhD in 1970, and her husband died in that same year. Lansing was always highly involved in political activity, as an activist and campaign supporter, frequently working for progressive causes and candidates. In the ensuing years, Lansing repeatedly ran for public office, including for a seat in the United States House of Representatives in 1974, but she was not successful. She was the chair of the local democratic party in 1960–61, and was a delegate to both the 1960 Democratic National Convention and the 1976 Democratic National Convention.

== Research ==
Lansing provided the first empirical evidence of the voting gender gap in the United States, in contrast to the conventional wisdom which either held that women voted as their husbands did, or at least that a person's gender did not play a role in their voting decision. Lansing's analyses were some of the first scientific investigations of voting behaviors by gender, and the discovery that women and men voted systematically differently had an effect on political campaigns and activism. She was not the first researcher to study this phenomenon, but according to her New York Times obituary, "the issue received little serious attention until she published the first persuasive statistical evidence that women form a distinctive voting bloc". She has therefore been credited with developing and popularizing the gender gap idea. She studied this phenomenon in her PhD dissertation, and in her 1980 book Women and politics: The invisible majority, coauthored with Sandra Baxter (and published in a later edition as Women and politics: The visible majority). Lansing demonstrated that at the time the greatest differences in voting by gender were not on economic or domestic issues, but on foreign affairs, contrary to prevailing assumptions about the priorities that women tended to favor as voters. Lansing further demonstrated that the gender gap was sufficiently large that women's votes could be decisive in close elections.

Lansing retired in 1986 and became a professor emerita at Eastern Michigan University. She died on May 1, 1998.

== Selected works ==
- "The voting patterns of American black women", in A Portrait of Marginality, in Marianne Githens and Jewel Prestage, eds. (1977)
- Women and politics: The invisible majority, with Sandra Baxter (1980)
- Women and Politics: The visible majority, revision of the 1980 book, with Sandra Baxter (1983)
