= List of United States presidential elections in which the winner lost the popular vote =

United States presidential elections in which the winner lost the popular vote
Year	Candidate	Percentage	Electoral vote margin
1824	Jackson	40.45%	+15 (Note: Even though Jackson received both more popular and electoral votes, no candidate received a majority of electoral college votes, so the 1824 election was decided by the House of Representatives in a contingent election per the 12th Amendment.)
1824	Adams	32.74%	+15
	Crawford	11.02%
	Clay	13.00%
1876	Tilden	50.92%	–1 (Note: The 1876 election was decided by an Electoral Commission. Tilden was leading 184–165 in the electoral vote count with 20 electoral votes remaining. Tilden received more than 50% of the popular vote, but the commission awarded the 20 disputed electoral votes to Hayes.)
1876	Hayes	47.92%	–1
	Cooper	0.99%
	Clay Smith	0.08%
1888	Cleveland	48.63%	–65
1888	Harrison	47.80%	–65
	Fisk	2.20%
	Streeter	1.31%
2000	Gore	48.38%	–5 (Note: The 2000 election was decided by the Supreme Court in Bush v. Gore, which halted the Florida recount and gave George W. Bush the state of Florida by 537 votes. Furthermore, a faithless elector abstained from voting for Al Gore, bringing it to −5 instead of −4.)
2000	Bush	47.86%	–5
	Nader	2.74%
	Buchanan	0.43%
2016	Clinton	48.18%	–77 (Note: In state-by-state tallies, Trump earned 306 pledged electors and Clinton 232, for a difference of –74. They lost two and five votes, respectively, to faithless electors, bringing the final difference to –77. Vice presidential candidates Pence and Kaine lost one and five votes, respectively. Three other votes by electors were invalidated and recast.)
2016	Trump	46.09%	–77
	Johnson	3.28%
	Stein	1.07%
Comparison of the presidential elections of 1824, 1876, 1888, 2000, and 2016, in which the Electoral College winner (or, in the case of the 1824 election, the contingent election winner) lost the popular vote

Instances in which the electoral college winner did not win the popular vote are rare, shown in the few descending bars at the right side of the chart.

There have been five United States presidential elections in which the successful presidential candidate did not receive a plurality of the popular vote, including the 1824 election, which was the first U.S. presidential election where the popular vote was recorded. In these cases, the successful candidate secured less of the national popular vote than another candidate who received more votes, either a majority, more than half the vote, or a plurality of the vote.

In the U.S. presidential election system, instead of the nationwide popular vote determining the outcome of the election, the president of the United States is determined by votes cast by electors of the Electoral College. Alternatively, if no candidate receives a simple majority of electoral votes, the election is determined by the House of Representatives. These procedures are governed by the Twelfth Amendment to the United States Constitution. The U.S. Constitution does not require states to hold a popular vote, however, since 1880, electors in every state have been chosen based on a popular election held on Election Day.

When American voters cast ballots in a general presidential election, they are choosing electors. In 48 of the 50 states, state laws mandate the winner of the plurality of its statewide popular vote shall receive all of that state's electors; in Maine and Nebraska, two electors are assigned in this manner, while the remaining electors are allocated based on the plurality of votes in each of their congressional districts. The federal district, Washington, D.C., allocates its 3 electoral votes to the winner of its single district election. States generally require electors to pledge to vote for that state's winning ticket; to avoid faithless electors, most states have adopted various laws to enforce the electors' pledge. The "national popular vote" is the sum of all the votes cast in the general election, nationwide. The presidential elections of 1876, 1888, 2000, and 2016 produced an Electoral College winner who did not receive the most votes in the general election. Additionally, in 15 other presidential elections (1844, 1848, 1856, 1860, 1880, 1884, 1892, 1912, 1916, 1948, 1960, 1968, 1992, 1996, and 2024), the winner received a plurality but not an outright majority of the total popular votes cast. In only one election (1876) did a candidate win a majority (not just a plurality) of the popular vote but lose the electoral vote.

Of the five winners who lost the popular vote, three (Adams, Harrison, and Trump) ran for reelection four years later and lost the popular vote, one (Bush) ran and won the election as well as the popular vote, and one (Hayes) did not run for re-election. Trump ran for reelection eight years later, winning the election and the popular vote. As of the 2024 election, no incumbent president has won re-election without winning the popular vote, and no president has won two terms in office without winning the popular vote at least once.

In 1824, there were six states in which electors were legislatively appointed rather than popularly elected, meaning the 'national' popular vote in that election does not include all states, so its significance is uncertain. When no candidate received a majority of electoral votes in 1824, the House of Representatives decided the election. These circumstances distinguish the 1824 election from the latter four elections, which were all held after all states had instituted the popular selection of electors, and in which a single candidate won an outright majority of electoral votes, thus becoming president without a contingent election in the House of Representatives. The true national popular vote total was also uncertain in the 1960 election, and the plurality winner depends on how votes for Alabama electors are allocated.

== Presidential elections ==
=== 1824: John Quincy Adams ===
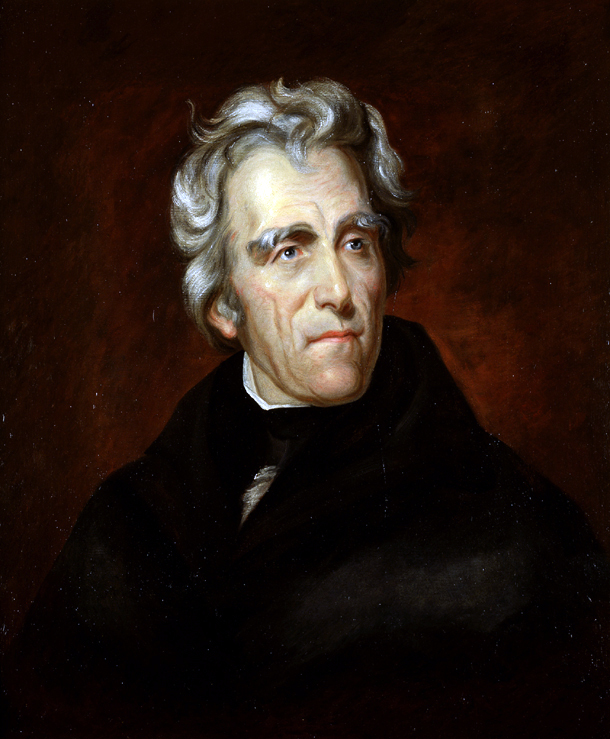
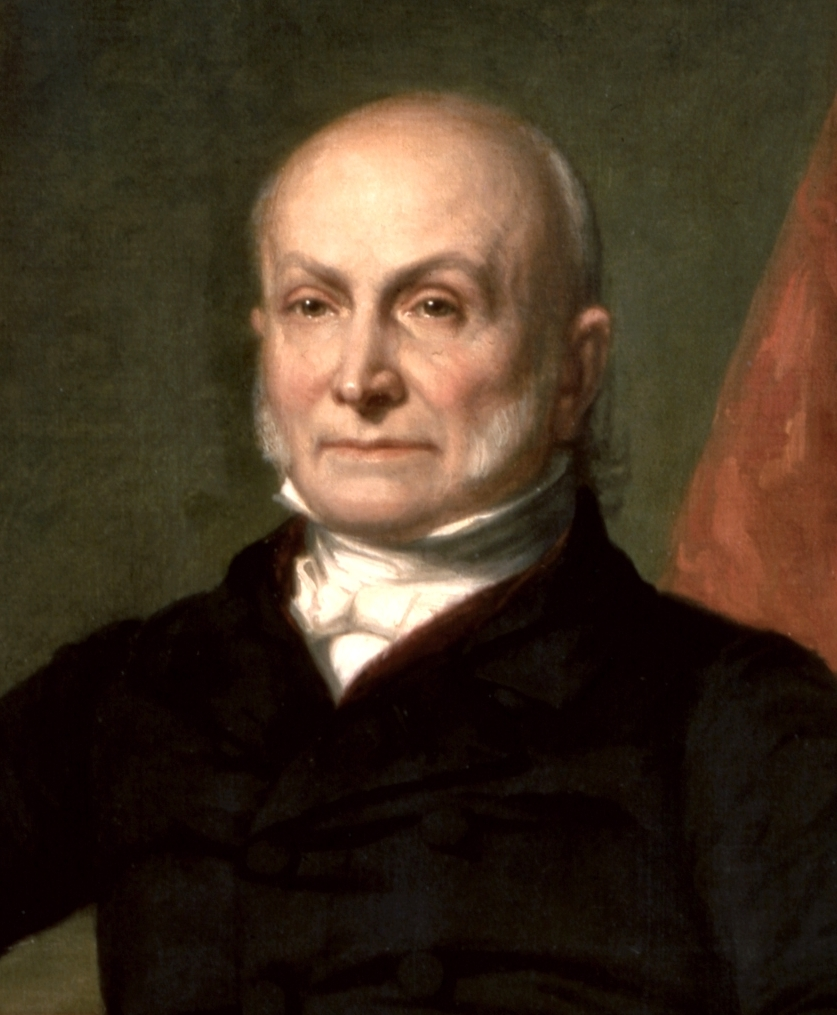
Andrew Jackson (left) won 7.8 percentage points more of the popular vote than elected President John Quincy Adams (right) in 1824.

The 1824 presidential election, held on October 26, 1824, was the first election in American history in which the popular vote mattered, as 18 states chose presidential electors by popular vote (six states still left the choice up to their state legislatures). When the final votes were tallied in those 18 states on December 1, Andrew Jackson polled 152,901 popular votes to John Quincy Adams' 114,023; Henry Clay won 47,217, and William H. Crawford won 46,979. However, the electoral college returns gave Jackson only 99 votes, 32 fewer than he needed for a majority of the total votes cast. Adams won 84 electoral votes, followed by 41 for Crawford, and 37 for Clay when the Electoral College met on December 1, 1824. All four candidates in the election identified with the Democratic-Republican Party.

As no candidate secured the required number of votes (131 total) from the Electoral College, the House of Representatives decided the election under the provisions of the Twelfth Amendment to the United States Constitution. As the 12th Amendment states that the top three candidates in the electoral vote are candidates in the contingent election, Henry Clay, who finished fourth, was eliminated. However, as Speaker of the House, Clay was still the most important player in determining the election outcome.

The contingent election was held on February 9, 1825, with each state having one vote, as determined by the wishes of the majority of each state's congressional representatives. Adams narrowly emerged as the winner, with majorities of the Representatives from 13 out of 24 states voting in his favor. Most of Clay's supporters, joined by several old Federalists, switched their votes to Adams in enough states to give him the election. Soon after his inauguration as president, Adams appointed Henry Clay as his secretary of state. This result became a source of great bitterness for Jackson and his supporters, who proclaimed the election of Adams a "corrupt bargain," and were inspired to create the Democratic Party.

=== 1876: Rutherford B. Hayes ===
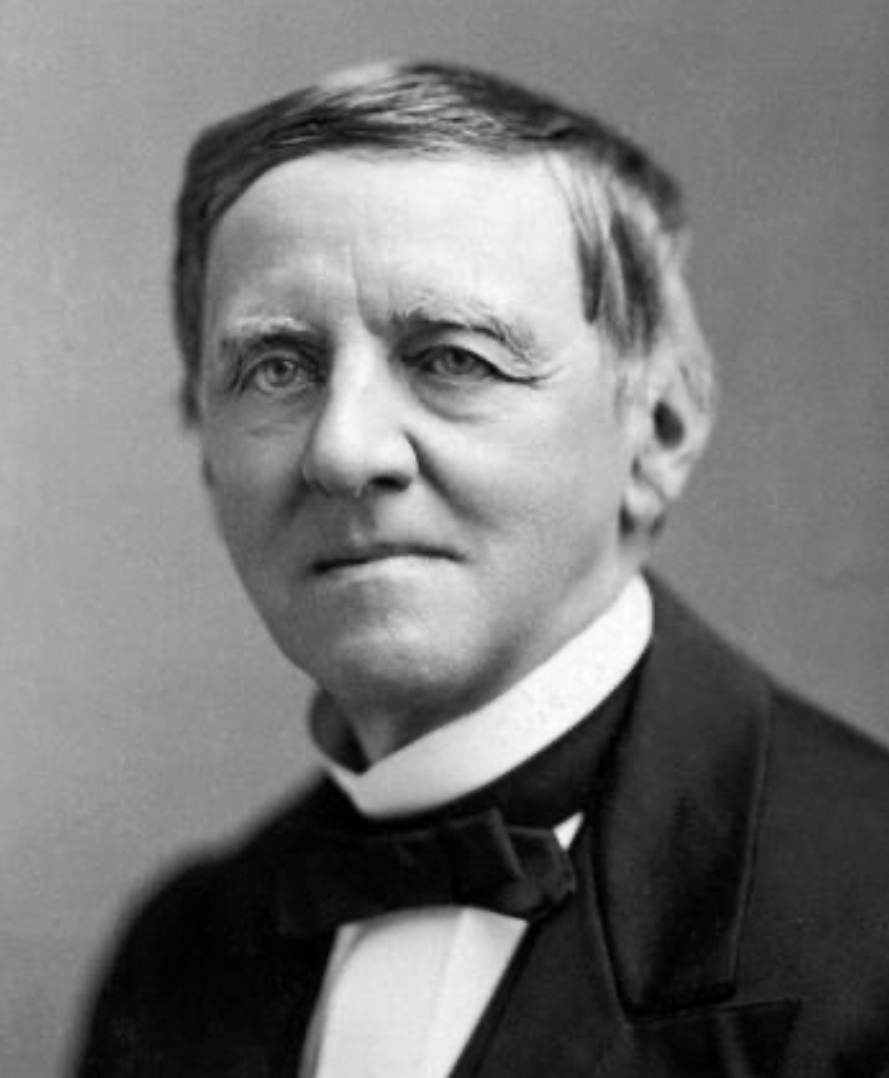
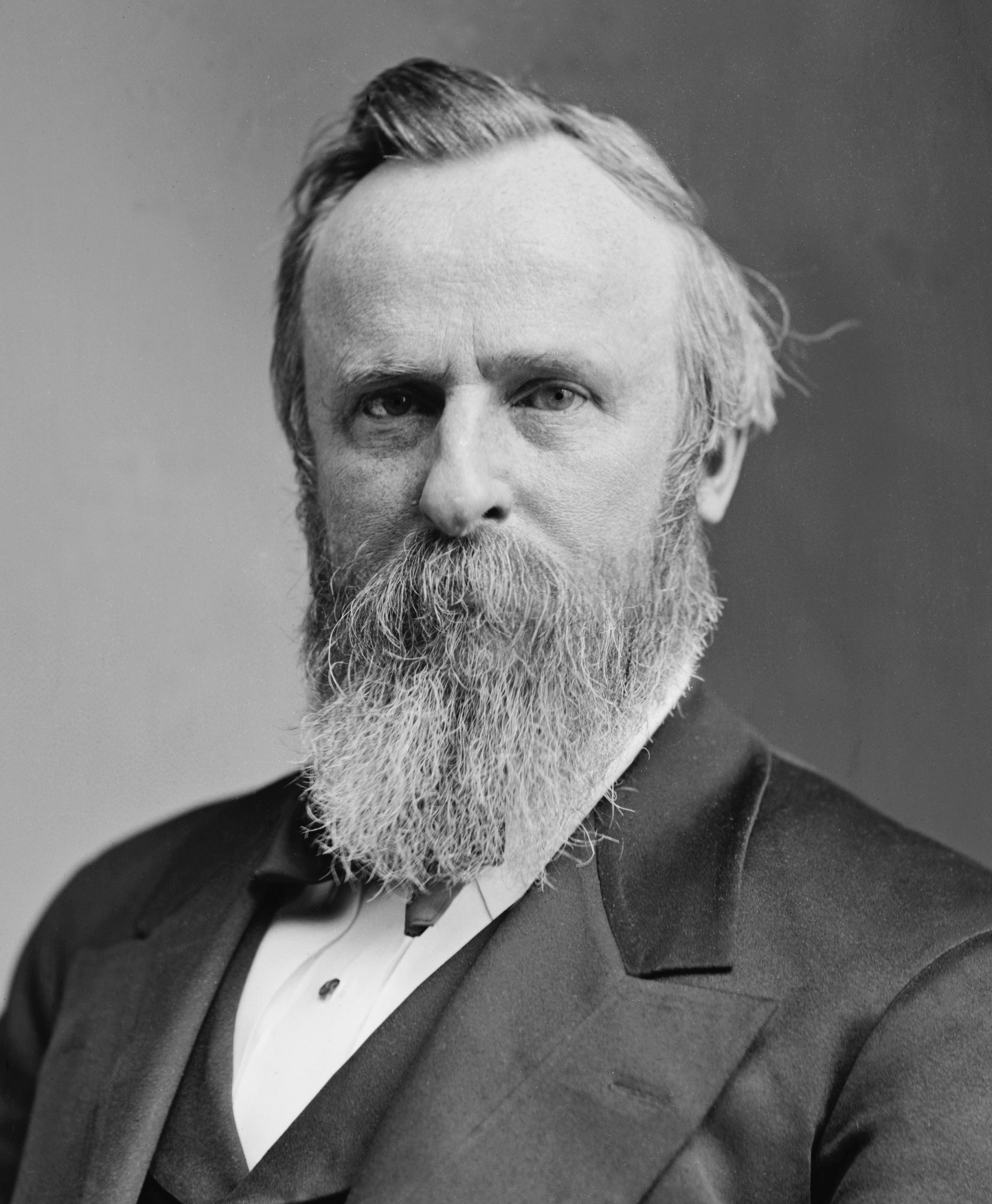
Samuel J. Tilden (left) won 3.0 percentage points more of the popular vote than elected President Rutherford B. Hayes (right) in 1876.

The 1876 presidential election, held on November 7, 1876, was one of the most contentious and controversial presidential elections in American history. The result of the election remains among the most disputed ever. Democrat Samuel J. Tilden of New York outpolled Ohio's Republican Rutherford B. Hayes in the popular vote, with Tilden winning 4,288,546 votes and Hayes winning 4,034,311; however, widespread allegations of electoral fraud, election violence and voter intimidation by paramilitary groups like the Red Shirts, and other sources of disenfranchisement of Black (predominantly Republican) citizens in the South, tainted the results. Tilden was, and remains, the only candidate in American history who lost a presidential election despite receiving a majority (not just a plurality) of the popular vote.

After a first count of votes, Tilden won 184 electoral votes to Hayes' 165, with 20 votes unresolved. These 20 electoral votes were in dispute in four states; in the case of Florida (4 votes), Louisiana (8 votes), and South Carolina (7 votes), each party reported its candidate had won the state. In Oregon, one elector was declared illegal (as an "elected or appointed official") and replaced. The question of who should have been awarded these 20 electoral votes is at the heart of the ongoing debate about the election of 1876.

An Electoral Commission, consisting of 15 men, was formed on January 29, 1877, to debate about the 20 electoral votes that were in dispute. The Commission consisted of five men from the House and the Senate each, plus five Supreme Court justices. Eight members were Republicans; seven were Democrats. The voter returns accepted by the Commission put Hayes' margin of victory in Oregon at 1,057 votes, Florida at 922 votes, Louisiana at 4,807 votes, and South Carolina at 889 votes; the closest popular vote margin in a decisive state in U.S. history until the presidential election of 2000. In late February, the Commission voted along party lines by a vote of 8 to 7 to award all 20 of the disputed electoral votes to Hayes, thus assuring his electoral victory by a margin of 185–184.

On March 2, an informal deal was struck to resolve the dispute: the Compromise of 1877. In return for the Democrats' acquiescence in Hayes' election (who agreed to serve only one four-year term as president and not to seek reelection as a provision of the deal), the Republicans agreed to withdraw federal troops from the South, ending Reconstruction. The Compromise effectively ceded power in the Southern states to the Democratic Redeemers, who went on to pursue their agenda of returning the South to a political economy resembling that of its pre-war condition, including the disenfranchisement of black voters and setting the groundwork for what would be known as the Jim Crow era.

=== 1888: Benjamin Harrison ===
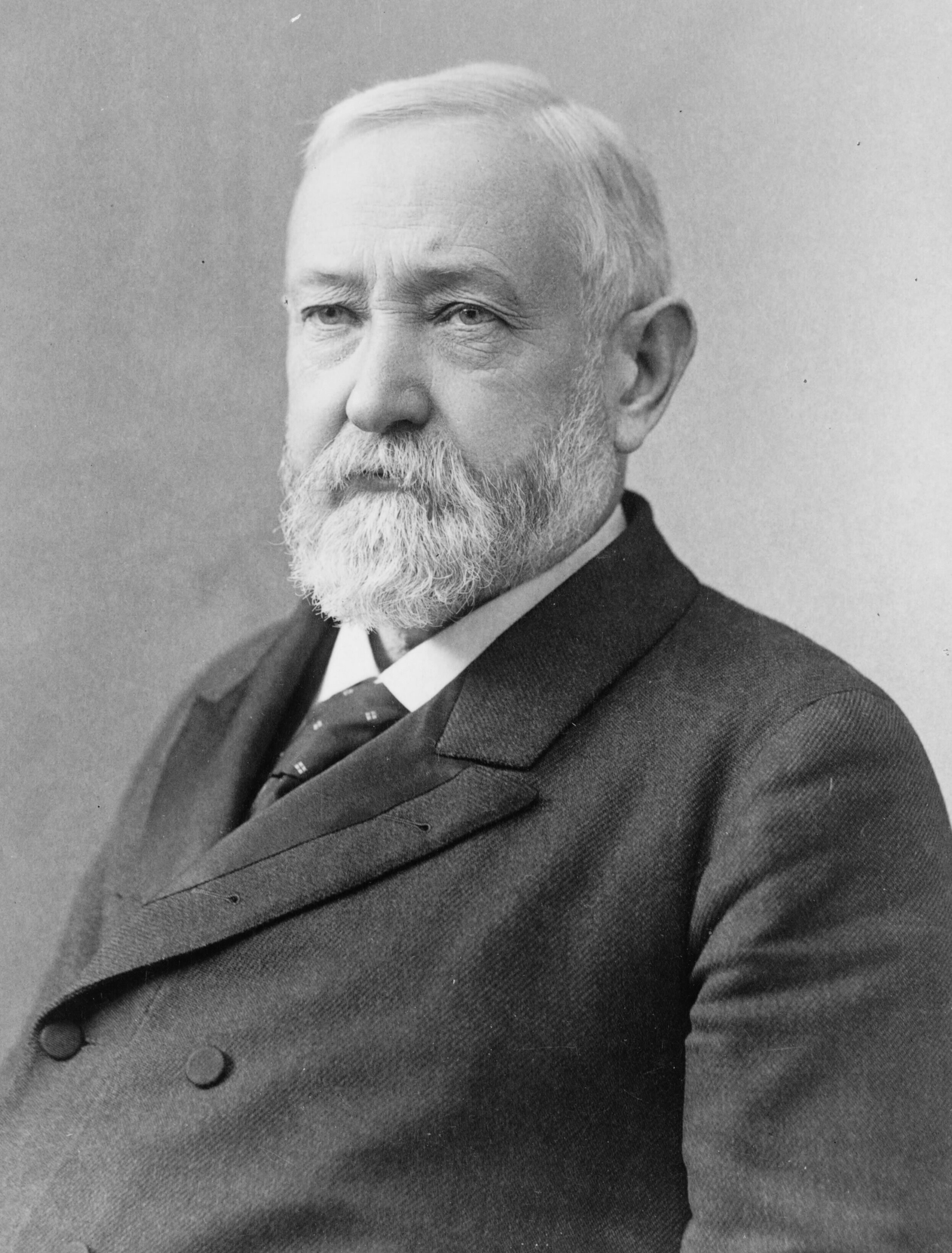
Grover Cleveland (left) won 0.8 percentage points more of the popular vote than elected President Benjamin Harrison (right) in 1888.

In the 1888 election, held on November 6, 1888, Grover Cleveland of New York, the incumbent president and a Democrat, tried to secure a second term against the Republican nominee Benjamin Harrison, a former U.S. Senator from Indiana. The economy was prosperous and the nation was at peace, but although Cleveland received 5,534,488 popular votes against 5,443,892 votes for Harrison, a 90,596 vote lead, he lost in the Electoral College. Harrison won 233 electoral votes, Cleveland only 168.

Tariff policy was the principal issue in the election. Harrison took the side of industrialists and factory workers who wanted to keep tariffs high, while Cleveland strenuously denounced high tariffs as unfair to consumers. His opposition to Civil War pensions and inflated currency also made enemies among veterans and farmers. On the other hand, he held a strong hand in the South and border states and appealed to former Republican Mugwumps.

Harrison swept almost the entire North and Midwest states, losing the popular vote only in Connecticut (by 336 votes) and New Jersey (by 7,148 votes), and narrowly carried the swing states of New York (by 14,373 votes) and Indiana (by 2,348 votes) (Cleveland and Harrison's respective home states) by a margin of 1% or less to achieve a majority of the electoral vote (New York with 36 electoral votes and Indiana with 15 electoral votes). Unlike the election of 1884, the power of the Tammany Hall political machine in New York City helped deny Cleveland the 36 electoral votes of his home state.

Cleveland's narrow popular vote lead was made possible in large part by massive disenfranchisement, intimidation, and voter suppression of hundreds of thousands of Black citizens in the South, who predominantly supported Harrison, as was noted by Republican politicians at the time.

=== 2000: George W. Bush ===
Al Gore (left) won 0.5 percentage points more of the popular vote than elected President George W. Bush (right) in 2000.

The 2000 presidential election, held on November 7, 2000, pitted Republican candidate George W. Bush (the incumbent governor of Texas and son of former president George H. W. Bush) against Democratic candidate Al Gore (the incumbent vice president of the United States under Bill Clinton). Despite Gore having received 543,895 more votes (a lead of 0.51 percent of all votes cast), it was effectively determined by the US Supreme Court, in a controversial 5–4 decision that halted a recount in Florida, that the Electoral College had chosen Bush as president by a vote of 271 to 266.

In the primaries, Vice President Gore had secured the Democratic nomination with relative ease. He defeated Bill Bradley in the primaries and other contests. Bush had been seen as the early favorite for the Republican nomination, and despite a contentious primary battle with Senator John McCain and other candidates, secured the nomination by Super Tuesday. Many third-party candidates also ran, most prominently Ralph Nader. Bush chose former Secretary of Defense Dick Cheney as his running mate, and Gore chose Senator Joe Lieberman as his. Both major-party candidates focused primarily on domestic issues, such as the budget, tax relief, and reforms for federal social-insurance programs, though foreign policy was not ignored.

The result of the election hinged on voting in Florida, where Bush's narrow official margin of victory of just 537 votes out of almost six million votes cast on election night triggered a mandatory recount, with mechanical failure by the machines used to cast votes a key issue. Litigation in select counties started additional recounts. This litigation ultimately reached the United States Supreme Court. The Court's contentious decision in Bush v. Gore, announced on December 12, 2000, ended the recounts, effectively awarding Florida's 25 Electoral College votes to Bush and granting him the victory. Later studies have reached conflicting opinions on who would have won the recount had it been allowed to proceed. Nationwide, George Bush received 50,456,002 votes (47.87%) and Gore received 50,999,897 (48.38%).

=== 2016: Donald Trump ===
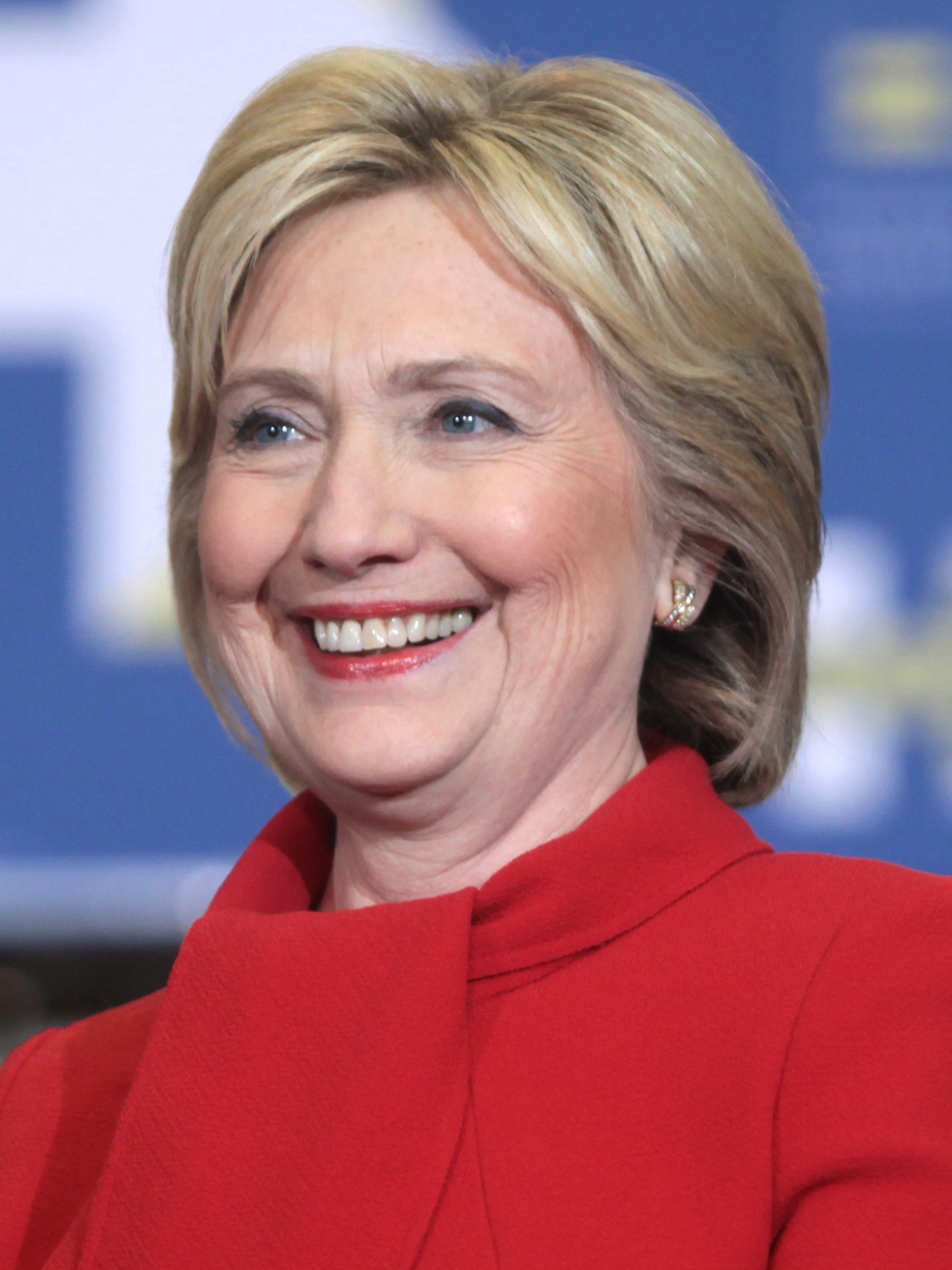
Hillary Clinton (left) won 2.1 percentage points more of the popular vote than elected President Donald Trump (right) in 2016.

The 2016 presidential election, held on November 8, 2016, featured Democratic nominee Hillary Clinton (former U.S. Senator from New York, Secretary of State, and First Lady to President Bill Clinton) and Republican nominee Donald Trump, a businessman (owner of the Trump Organization) from New York City. Both nominees had turbulent journeys in primary races, and were viewed unfavorably by the general public. The election saw multiple third-party candidates, and there were over a million write-in votes cast.

During the 2016 election, "pre-election polls fueled high-profile predictions that Hillary Clinton's likelihood of winning the presidency was about 90 percent, with estimates ranging from 71 to over 99 percent." National polls were generally accurate, showing a Clinton lead of about 3% in the national popular vote (she ultimately won the two-party national popular vote by 2.1%). State-level polls "showed a competitive, uncertain contest ... but clearly under-estimated Trump's support in the Upper Midwest." Trump exceeded expectations on Election Day by winning the traditionally Democratic-leaning Rust Belt states of Michigan, Pennsylvania, and Wisconsin by narrow margins. Clinton recorded large margins in large states such as California, Illinois, and New York, winning California by a margin of nearly 4.3 million votes, while coming closer to winning Texas, Arizona, and Georgia than any Democratic nominee since the turn of the millennium, but still losing by a significant margin. Clinton also won the Democratic medium-sized states such as Maryland, Massachusetts, New Jersey, and Washington with vast margins. Clinton managed to edge out Trump in Virginia, a swing state where her running mate Tim Kaine had served as Governor. Trump also won the traditional bellwether state of Florida, as well as the recent battleground state of North Carolina, further contributing to the electoral flip of the popular vote. Trump won by a large margin in Indiana, Missouri, Ohio, and Tennessee.

When the Electoral College cast its votes on December 19, 2016, Trump received 304 votes to Clinton's 227 with seven electors defecting to other choices, the most faithless electors (2 from Trump, 5 from Clinton) in any presidential election in over a hundred years. Clinton had nonetheless received almost three million more votes in the general election than Trump, giving Clinton a popular vote lead of 2.1% over Trump.

== Comparative table of elections ==
Democratic-Republican · DR Democratic · D Republican · R
Election	Winner and party		Electoral College		Popular vote (Note: Popular vote and voter turnout figures for the 1824 election exclude Delaware, Georgia, Louisiana, New York, South Carolina, and Vermont. In all of these states, the electors were chosen by the state legislatures rather than by popular vote.)				Runner-up and party		Turnout
			Votes	%	Votes	Margin	%	Margin %			%
1824	John Quincy Adams	DR	84/261	32.18%	122,440	-28,869	32.74%	-7.72%	Andrew Jackson	DR	26.9%^{†}
1876	Rutherford B. Hayes	R	185/369	50.14%	4,034,142	-252,666	47.92%	-3.00%	Samuel J. Tilden	D	81.8%^{†}
1888	Benjamin Harrison	R	233/401	58.10%	5,443,633	-94,530	47.80%	-0.83%	Grover Cleveland	D	80.5%^{†}
2000	George W. Bush	R	271/538	50.37%	50,456,002	−543,895	47.87%	−0.51%	Al Gore	D	52.02%^{*}
2016	Donald Trump	R	304/538	55.50%	62,984,828	−2,868,686	46.09%	−2.10%	Hillary Clinton	D	59.18%^{*}

No source has been found providing accuracy to a hundredth of a percent, and voter turnout in United States presidential elections is fundamentally unreliable prior to 1932.
The number of eligible voters in the United States is not tracked; voter turnout in United States presidential elections must be statistically "guessed". The number of people in the United States who are old enough is tracked (with a margin of error, because it is based on self-reporting in the US census, which is limited in what questions it can legally ask), but this includes an untracked number of people who are ineligible to vote, such as non-citizen residents and disenfranchised felons. It is not universally the case that someone must register to vote in order to do so in the United States.

- The 1800 United States presidential election resulted in a pure tie: Thomas Jefferson and Aaron Burr each received 60.57% of the popular vote and 52.90% of the electoral college votes; the tie was broken by the outgoing House of Representatives. Since the final winner did not lose the popular vote and instead tied for it, the election does not qualify for this table.
- The 1960 United States presidential election has an unknowable "true" popular vote total due to the 1960 United States presidential election in Alabama, which did not permit voters to distinguish votes for John F. Kennedy from, functionally speaking, votes for Harry F. Byrd; this table intentionally matches both of those articles' totals, which means that 5,747 ≈ 1.01% of the votes cast in Alabama's election count for Byrd alone and all remaining votes count for Byrd and Kennedy simultaneously (for the purposes of this table, all that matters is Kennedy's final total); this means the election does not qualify for this table.

== 1960 election ambiguity: Alabama's unpledged electors ==
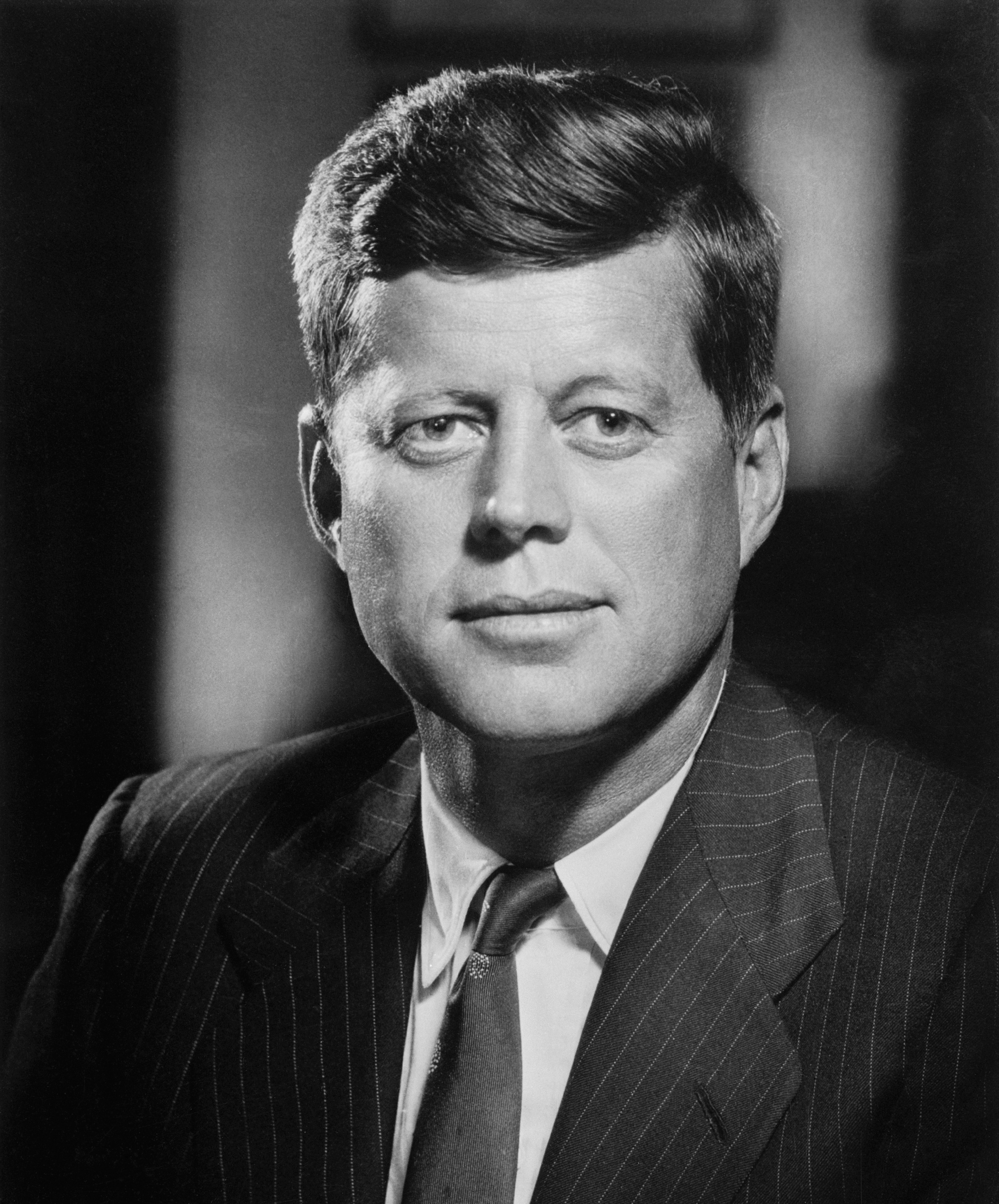
There is disagreement about whether Richard Nixon (left) or elected President John F. Kennedy (right) won more of the popular vote in 1960.

In the 1960 United States presidential election, Democratic candidate John F. Kennedy defeated Republican candidate Richard Nixon, winning 303 Electoral College votes to Nixon's 219. Kennedy is generally considered to have won the popular vote as well, by a narrow margin of 0.17 percent (the second-narrowest winning margin ever, after the 1880 election), but based on the unusual nature of the election in Alabama, political journalists such as John Fund and Sean Trende were able to later argue that Nixon actually won the popular vote.

Ballots in Alabama listed the individual electors pledged to the candidates, rather than a single slate of electors for each candidate as in all the other states. There were eleven Republican electors pledged to Nixon, six unpledged Democratic electors, and five Democratic electors pledged to Kennedy, from which each voter could choose up to eleven. Consequently, there are multiple possible ways to calculate the popular vote that each candidate received.

Historian and Kennedy associate Arthur M. Schlesinger Jr. wrote that, "It is impossible to determine what Kennedy's popular vote in Alabama was" and under one hypothesized scenario "Nixon would have won the popular vote by 58,000". The six Electoral College votes for Democrat Byrd – who did not run for election – provide the fodder for arguing with regard to various scenarios. According to political scientist Steven Schier, "If one divides the Alabama Democratic votes proportionately between the Kennedy and Byrd slates, Nixon ekes out a 50,000 vote popular plurality"; this margin of 0.07 percent would have been the narrowest margin ever in a presidential election, with no impact on the Electoral College results. The Congressional Quarterly calculated the popular vote in this manner at the time of the 1960 election.

In the event, the state's electoral votes were awarded to the Democratic slate, of which the six unpledged electors cast their votes for non-candidate Harry F. Byrd as a protest against Kennedy's support for civil rights, while the other five electors voted for Kennedy.

== See also ==
- Contemporary issues and criticism of the Electoral College
- List of United States presidential elections by Electoral College margin
- List of United States presidential elections by popular vote margin
- List of United States presidential candidates by number of votes received
- List of highest presidential election vote totals by U.S. state
- National Popular Vote Interstate Compact
