= List of United States presidential elections by Electoral College margin =

In United States presidential elections, citizens who are registered to vote cast ballots for members of the Electoral College who then cast electoral votes for president and vice president. In order to be elected to office, a candidate must win an absolute majority of electoral votes. Since the Twenty-third Amendment in 1961 gave citizens residing in the District of Columbia the right to vote, this meant winning at least 270 of the 538 electoral votes. Since the Twelfth Amendment in 1804, electors cast separate votes for the president and vice president. Previously, each elector cast two votes for president, and the winner and runner-up became president and vice president, respectively.

== Definition of the margin ==
=== Informal definition ===
The margin of victory in a presidential election is the difference between the number of Electoral College votes garnered by the candidate with an absolute majority of electoral votes (since 1964, it has been 270 out of 538) and the number received by the second place candidate (currently in the range of 2 to 538, a margin of one vote is only possible with an odd total number of electors or a faithless elector). The exception occurs if no candidate receives an absolute majority of votes in the Electoral College. In such a situation, the House of Representatives holds a contingent presidential election. As prescribed by the Constitution, the House chooses from among the three candidates who received the most electoral votes. Thus, the winner could be a candidate who initially finished in third-place with one electoral vote. Each state delegation votes en bloc, with each state having a single vote. A candidate is required to receive an absolute majority of state delegation votes (currently 26 votes) in order for that candidate to become the president-elect.

Because the Electoral College has grown in size, the results are normalized to compensate. For example, take two elections: 1848 and 1968. In the election of 1968, Richard Nixon won with a majority of 32 votes. At first glance, the election of 1848 appears closer, because Zachary Taylor won with a majority of only 18 votes, however, Nixon could have received as many as 269 votes above a majority (if he had won unanimously), while Taylor could only have received 145 votes above the majority. Thus, the two elections must be normalized to each other to compare them: Nixon's margin of victory is calculated by dividing 32 by 269 to get 0.119. The same is done with Taylor by dividing 18 by 145, to get 0.124. Nixon's election was actually closer, because a smaller fraction of the electors separated Nixon from facing a contingent election in the House.

While the above explanation applies to modern elections, initially the process was different. Prior to the ratification of the Twelfth Amendment in 1804, the winner of the presidential election was whoever received both a majority of electors to vote for them, and who received the most votes, because each elector cast two presidential votes. Thus, if two candidates had above 50% of the electors, the margin of victory is the victorious candidate's margin over the other candidate who had above 50% of the electors. Of the four elections prior to the 12th Amendment, 1792 and 1800 both involved two candidates receiving above 50% of the electoral votes.

=== Mathematical definition ===
The margin of victory in the election is calculated as follows: let c be the total number of electors voting in the election. Let w be the number of electoral votes cast for the candidate with the most electoral votes, and let r be the number of votes for the runner-up. The United States Constitution provides that if the candidate with the most votes does not receive a simple majority of the electors voting, the United States House of Representatives chooses the president. So, the margin of victory is the number of electoral votes over both the runner-up and half the electoral votes cast. For elections after the passage of the 12th Amendment, the runner-up will always have less than half of the electoral votes cast, so the absolute margin of victory will be the difference of the winner's electoral votes and half the electoral votes cast. To express this in mathematical formulae:

$$\mbox{absolute margin of victory} = \begin{cases}0; & w \le \frac{c}{2} \\ w - \max\{r, \frac{c}{2}\}; & w > \frac{c}{2} \end{cases}$$

The minimum possible value for the margin of victory is clearly zero. The maximum possible value of the margin of victory occurs in the case in which each elector casts a vote for the winning candidate and the runner-up gets no more than half of the vote. In this case, the maximum margin of victory is c/2. In order to meaningfully compare election to election, we need that maximum margin to be constant from election to election. Thus, we divide the absolute margin of victory by c/2 to get a normalized margin of victory that ranges from 0 to 1:

$$\mbox{normalized margin of victory} = \begin{cases}0; & w \le \frac{c}{2} \\ \frac{w - \max\{r, \frac{c}{2}\}}{\frac{c}{2}}; & w > \frac{c}{2} \end{cases}$$

== Table of election results ==
Under the procedure provided in Article II, Section 1, Clause 3 of the Constitution, by which the Electoral College functioned during the first four presidential elections (prior to ratification of the Twelfth Amendment), each elector cast two votes, one for president and one for vice president, but did not distinguish between them. The table's "runner-up" column shows the number of electoral votes for the candidate receiving the second highest number of combined electoral votes, and thus was elected vice president, for each of these elections except for the 1800 United States presidential election, which ended in a tie between two candidates – the presidential and vice presidential candidates of the same party. The value in the runner-up column for 1800 is the number of electoral votes received by the presidential candidate of the other major political party (even though the two winning candidates each received more electoral votes than he did). The number in parentheses in the "Rank" column is the rank that would have been assigned to this election under the rules of the 12th Amendment.

The 1824 United States presidential election is ranked closer than the election of 1800 because the 1800 election resulted in a tie between the same party's candidates for president and vice president (as presidential and vice presidential electoral votes were not distinguished), while the election of 1824 resulted in the contingent election in the House of Representatives selecting the candidate who had won the second highest number of electoral votes (out of the top three) since no candidate got a majority, 41 presidents have won a large total number of electoral votes, Franklin D. Roosevelt received the most total of electoral votes received by a candidate who was elected to the office of president due to him being the only one to serve more than two terms (1,876) and Zachary Taylor received the smallest (163).

Presidency decided by the House of Representatives

Rank	Year	Winner	Number of electors voting			Normalized victory margin	Percentage
Rank	Year	Winner	total	winner	runner-up	Normalized victory margin	Percentage
			(c)	(w)	(r)		
60.	1824	John Quincy Adams (Note: None of the presidential candidates in 1824 received a majority of the electoral vote, so the presidential election was decided by the House of Representatives, who selected Adams.)	261	99	84	0.000	37.93%
59.	1876	Rutherford B. Hayes	369	185	184	0.003	50.14%
58.	2000	George W. Bush	538	271	266	0.009	50.47%
57.	1796	John Adams	138 (Note: Under the original procedure for the Electoral College, each elector had two votes and voted for two individuals. The candidate receiving the majority of votes became president, and the candidate with the second highest number of votes became vice-president. One Maryland elector pledged to Adams cast his two votes for Adams and Jefferson, bringing the total between them to 139 votes.)	71	68	0.029	51.45%
56.	1916	Woodrow Wilson	531	277	254	0.043	52.17%
55.	1800	Thomas Jefferson and Aaron Burr (tie) (Note: Under the original procedure for the Electoral College, each elector had two votes and voted for two individuals. The candidate receiving the majority of votes became president, and the candidate with the second highest number of votes became vice-president. While Jefferson had more electoral votes than his principal opponent, John Adams, he was tied with his vice-presidential running mate, Aaron Burr in electoral votes. Because of the tie, the 1800 presidential election was decided by the House of Representatives, who selected Jefferson as president after 36 ballots. Subsequently, the Twelfth Amendment to the United States Constitution was enacted in order to provide for the president and vice-president to be elected as a single ticket.)	138	73	65	0.000	52.90%
54.	2004	George W. Bush	538	286	251	0.063	53.16%
53.	1884	Grover Cleveland	401	219	182	0.092	54.61%
52.	1976	Jimmy Carter	538	297	240	0.104	55.20%
51.	1968	Richard Nixon	538	301	191	0.119	55.95%
50.	1848	Zachary Taylor	290	163	127	0.124	56.21%
49.	1960	John F. Kennedy	537	303	219	0.128	56.42%
48.	2016	Donald Trump (Note: In the 2016 United States presidential election, a total of 7 faithless electors cast their votes for another person, thus Trump received only 304 Electoral Votes despite winning 306, whereas runner-up Hillary Clinton received 227 Electoral Votes despite winning 232.)	538	304	227	0.130	56.51%
47.	2020	Joe Biden	538	306	232	0.138	56.88%
46.	1948	Harry S. Truman	531	303	189	0.141	57.06%
45.	1836	Martin Van Buren	294	170	73	0.156	57.82%
44.	2024	Donald Trump	538	312	226	0.160	57.99%
43.	1880	James A. Garfield	369	214	155	0.160	57.99%
42.	1888	Benjamin Harrison	401	233	168	0.162	58.10%
41.	1856	James Buchanan	296	174	114	0.176	58.78%
40.	1812	James Madison	217	128	89	0.180	58.99%
39.	1860	Abraham Lincoln	303	180	72	0.188	59.41%
38.	1896	William McKinley	447	271	176	0.213	60.63%
37.	2012	Barack Obama	538	332	206	0.234	61.71%
36.	1844	James K. Polk	275	170	105	0.236	61.82%
35.	1892	Grover Cleveland	444	277	145	0.248	62.39%
34.	1900	William McKinley	447	292	155	0.306	65.32%
33.	1908	William Howard Taft	483	321	162	0.329	66.46%
32.	2008	Barack Obama	538	365	173	0.357	67.84%
31.	1828	Andrew Jackson	261	178	83	0.364	68.20%
30.	1992	Bill Clinton	538	370	168	0.375	68.77%
29.	1808	James Madison	175	122	47	0.394	69.71%
28.	1996	Bill Clinton	538	379	159	0.409	70.45%
27.	1904	Theodore Roosevelt	476	336	140	0.412	70.59%
26.	1924	Calvin Coolidge	531	382	136	0.439	71.94%
25.	1868	Ulysses S. Grant	294	214	80	0.456	72.79%
24.	1920	Warren G. Harding	531	404	127	0.522	76.08%
23.	1832	Andrew Jackson	286	219	49	0.531	76.57%
22.	1988	George H. W. Bush	538	426	111	0.584	79.18%
21.	1840	William Henry Harrison	294	234	60	0.592	79.59%
20.	1944	Franklin D. Roosevelt	531	432	99	0.627	81.36%
19.	1912	Woodrow Wilson	531	435	88	0.638	81.92%
18.	1872	Ulysses S. Grant (Note: Votes which were not counted do not change the majority needed to win. In 1820, there were 232 counted votes as three electors had died and there was insufficient time for replacements to be found, but the winner needed 118 (majority of 235) votes to win. In 1872, three votes cast for the deceased Horace Greeley for president were rejected (349 counted votes), but 177 votes were needed to win (majority of 352).)	352	286	42	0.639	81.95%
17.	1952	Dwight D. Eisenhower	531	442	89	0.665	83.24%
16.	1928	Herbert Hoover	531	444	87	0.672	83.62%
15.	1816	James Monroe	217	183	34	0.687	84.33%
14.	1940	Franklin D. Roosevelt	531	449	82	0.691	84.56%
13.	1852	Franklin Pierce	296	254	42	0.716	85.81%
12.	1956	Dwight D. Eisenhower	531	457	73	0.721	86.06%
11.	1932	Franklin D. Roosevelt	531	472	59	0.778	88.89%
10.	1964	Lyndon B. Johnson	538	486	52	0.807	90.33%
9.	1980	Ronald Reagan	538	489	49	0.818	90.89%
8.	1864	Abraham Lincoln	233	212	21	0.820	90.99%
7.	1804	Thomas Jefferson	176	162	14	0.841	92.05%
6.	1972	Richard Nixon	538	520	17	0.933	96.65%
5.	1984	Ronald Reagan	538	525	13	0.952	97.58%
4.	1936	Franklin D. Roosevelt	531	523	8	0.970	98.49%
3.	1820	James Monroe (Note: There was a dispute as to whether Missouri's electoral votes in 1820 were valid, due to the timing of its assumption of statehood. The figures listed include those votes.)	232	231	1	0.991 (Note: The elections of 1788-89, 1792, and 1820 had a candidate run effectively unopposed. However, Monroe did not receive all of the counted electoral votes in 1820 as an elector from New Hampshire, William Plumer, voted for John Quincy Adams.)	99.57%
2.	1792	George Washington (Note: George Washington received the vote of every elector, but the second vote of each elector was split among other candidates under the system in place.)	132	132	77	1.000	100%
1.	1788–1789	George Washington (Note: Only ten of the thirteen states cast electoral votes in the first ever presidential election: North Carolina and Rhode Island were ineligible to participate since they had not yet ratified the United States Constitution, while New York failed to appoint its electors before the appropriate deadline because its state legislature was deadlocked.)	69	69	34	1.000	100%

== See also ==
- List of United States presidential elections by popular vote margin
- National Popular Vote Interstate Compact
- United States presidential elections in which the winner lost the popular vote
