= List of United States presidential elections by popular vote margin =

vote margins of victory in presidential elections from 1828 to 2024, in percentage points

In a United States presidential election, the popular vote is the total number or the percentage of votes cast for a candidate by voters in the 50 states and Washington, D.C.; the candidate who gains the most votes nationwide is said to have won the popular vote. As the popular vote is not used to determine who is elected as the nation's president or vice president, it is possible for the winner of the popular vote to end up losing the election, an outcome that has occurred on five occasions, most recently in 2016. This is because presidential elections are indirect elections; the votes cast on Election Day are not cast directly for a candidate but for members of the Electoral College. The Electoral College's electors then formally elect the president and vice president.

The Twelfth Amendment to the United States Constitution (1804) provides the procedure by which the president and vice president are elected; electors vote separately for each office. Previously, electors cast two votes for president, and the winner and runner up became president and vice-president respectively. The appointment of electors is a matter for each state's legislature to determine; in 1872 and in every presidential election since 1880, all states have used a popular vote to do so. In every presidential election from 1788 through 1828, multiple state legislatures selected their presidential electors by discretionary appointment rather than by popular vote, while the South Carolina General Assembly did so in every presidential election through 1860, and the Florida Legislature and the Colorado General Assembly selected their presidential electors by discretionary appointment in 1868 and 1876 respectively.

The 1824 election was the first in which the popular vote was first fully recorded and reported. Since then, 19 presidential elections have occurred in which a candidate was elected or reelected without gaining a majority of the popular vote. Since the 1988 election, the popular vote of presidential elections has been decided by single-digit margins, the longest streak of close-election results since states began popularly electing presidents in the 1820s.

== List ==
Parties: Federalist • Democratic-Republican • National Republican • Whig • Democratic • Republican • Progressive • Independent Vote outcomes: Winner received only a plurality of the popular vote • Winner lost the popular vote • Winner chosen by the House of Representatives
Election	Winner and party		Electoral College		Popular vote				Runner-up and party		Turnout
Election	Winner and party		Votes	%	%	Margin	Votes	Margin	Runner-up and party		Turnout
1788–89	George Washington	Ind.	69/69	100%	100%	100%	43,782	43,782	No candidate (Note: Washington ran unopposed and was unanimously elected in both elections; John Adams received the majority of electors' second votes and became vice-president.)		11.6%
1792	George Washington	Ind.	132/132	100%	100%	100%	28,579	28,579	No candidate		6.3%
1796	John Adams	Fed.	71/138	51.45%	53.45%	6.90%	35,726	4,611	Thomas Jefferson	D-R (Note: Jefferson became vice-president, as both Adams's and Jefferson's electors split over their choices for vice-president.)	20.1%
1800	Thomas Jefferson	D-R	73/138	52.90%	61.43%	22.86%	41,330	15,378	Aaron Burr	D-R (Note: Jefferson and Burr ran on the same ticket, and Jefferson's main election rival in the 1800 election was incumbent president and Federalist candidate John Adams. Due to the Democratic-Republicans failing to arrange for a different candidate to receive what was Burr's 73rd electoral vote, the election was decided by the House, which eventually elected Jefferson on the 36th ballot. The Twelfth Amendment was later enacted to prevent a recurrence of the issue.)	32.3%
1804	Thomas Jefferson	D-R	162/176	92.05%	72.79%	45.58%	104,110	65,191	Charles C. Pinckney	Fed.	23.8%
1808	James Madison	D-R	122/175	69.72%	64.74%	32.33%	124,732	62,301	Charles C. Pinckney	Fed.	36.8%
1812	James Madison	D-R	128/217	58.99%	50.37%	2.74%	140,431	7,650	DeWitt Clinton	D-R (Note: While commonly labeled as the Federalist candidate, Clinton ran as a Democratic-Republican and was not nominated by the Federalist party itself, the latter simply deciding not to field a candidate. This did not prevent endorsements from state Federalist parties, such as in Pennsylvania; he also received endorsements from state Democratic-Republican parties, such as in New York.)	40.4%
1816	James Monroe	D-R	183/217	84.33%	68.16%	37.24%	76,592	41,852	Rufus King	Fed.	23.5%
1820	James Monroe	D-R	231/232	99.57%	80.61%	64.69%	87,343	69,878	John Quincy Adams	D-R (Note: The 1820 election took place at the height of the Era of Good Feelings, and Monroe did not face serious opposition, although 16% of the popular vote went towards unpledged Federalist electors. Adams's only electoral vote came from a faithless elector.)	10.1%
1824	John Quincy Adams	D-R	84/261	32.18%	30.92%	−10.44%	113,142	−38,221	Andrew Jackson	D-R (Note: Jackson won a plurality of electoral votes (99 compared to Adams's 84) but lost due to Adams securing a majority of state delegations in the contingent election.)	26.9%
1828	Andrew Jackson	Dem.	178/261	68.20%	55.93%	12.25%	642,806	140,839	John Quincy Adams	NR	57.3%
1832	Andrew Jackson	Dem.	219/286	76.57%	54.74%	17.81%	702,735	228,628	Henry Clay	NR	57.0%
1836	Martin Van Buren	Dem.	170/294	57.82%	50.79%	14.20%	763,291	213,384	William Henry Harrison	Whig	56.5%
1840	William Henry Harrison	Whig	234/294	79.59%	52.87%	6.05%	1,275,583	145,938	Martin Van Buren	Dem.	80.3%
1844	James K. Polk	Dem.	170/275	61.82%	49.54%	1.45%	1,339,570	39,413	Henry Clay	Whig	79.2%
1848	Zachary Taylor	Whig	163/290	56.21%	47.28%	4.79%	1,360,235	137,882	Lewis Cass	Dem.	72.8%
1852	Franklin Pierce	Dem.	254/296	85.81%	50.83%	6.95%	1,605,943	219,525	Winfield Scott	Whig	69.5%
1856	James Buchanan	Dem.	174/296	58.78%	45.29%	12.20%	1,835,140	494,472	John C. Frémont	Rep.	79.4%
1860	Abraham Lincoln	Rep.	180/303	59.41%	39.65%	10.13%	1,855,993	474,049	John C. Breckinridge	Dem. (Note: Breckinridge was the runner up in the electoral vote, while Stephen A. Douglas was the runner up in the popular vote.)	81.8%
1864	Abraham Lincoln	Rep.	212/233	90.99%	55.03%	10.08%	2,211,317	405,090	George B. McClellan	Dem.	76.3%
1868	Ulysses S. Grant	Rep.	214/294	72.79%	52.66%	5.32%	3,013,790	304,810	Horatio Seymour	Dem.	80.9%
1872	Ulysses S. Grant	Rep.	286/352	81.25%	55.58%	11.80%	3,597,439	763,729	Thomas A. Hendricks	Dem. (Note: The initial Democratic-backed candidate, Horace Greeley of the Liberal Republican Party), died between the popular election and the meeting of electors; his electoral college votes scattered, with Hendricks gaining 42 of the 66 electors previously committed to Greeley.)	72.1%
1876	Rutherford B. Hayes	Rep.	185/369	50.14%	47.92%	−3.00%	4,034,142	−252,666	Samuel J. Tilden	Dem.	82.6%
1880	James A. Garfield	Rep.	214/369	57.99%	48.31%	0.09%	4,453,337	1,898	Winfield Scott Hancock	Dem.	80.5%
1884	Grover Cleveland	Dem.	219/401	54.61%	48.85%	0.57%	4,914,482	57,579	James G. Blaine	Rep.	78.2%
1888	Benjamin Harrison	Rep.	233/401	58.10%	47.80%	−0.83%	5,443,892	−90,596	Grover Cleveland	Dem.	80.5%
1892	Grover Cleveland	Dem.	277/444	62.39%	46.02%	3.01%	5,553,898	363,099	Benjamin Harrison	Rep.	75.8%
1896	William McKinley	Rep.	271/447	60.63%	51.02%	4.31%	7,112,138	601,331	William Jennings Bryan	Dem.	79.6%
1900	William McKinley	Rep.	292/447	65.23%	51.64%	6.12%	7,228,864	857,932	William Jennings Bryan	Dem.	73.7%
1904	Theodore Roosevelt	Rep.	336/476	70.59%	56.42%	18.83%	7,630,557	2,546,677	Alton Brooks Parker	Dem.	65.5%
1908	William Howard Taft	Rep.	321/483	66.46%	51.57%	8.53%	7,678,335	1,269,356	William Jennings Bryan	Dem.	65.7%
1912	Woodrow Wilson	Dem.	435/531	81.92%	41.84%	14.44%	6,296,284	2,173,563	Theodore Roosevelt	Prog.	59.0%
1916	Woodrow Wilson	Dem.	277/531	52.17%	49.24%	3.12%	9,126,868	578,140	Charles Evans Hughes	Rep.	61.8%
1920	Warren G. Harding	Rep.	404/531	76.08%	60.32%	26.17%	16,144,093	7,004,432	James M. Cox	Dem.	49.2%
1924	Calvin Coolidge	Rep.	382/531	71.94%	54.04%	25.22%	15,723,789	7,337,547	John W. Davis	Dem.	48.9%
1928	Herbert Hoover	Rep.	444/531	83.62%	58.21%	17.41%	21,427,123	6,411,659	Al Smith	Dem.	56.9%
1932	Franklin D. Roosevelt	Dem.	472/531	88.89%	57.41%	17.76%	22,821,277	7,060,023	Herbert Hoover	Rep.	56.9%
1936	Franklin D. Roosevelt	Dem.	523/531	98.49%	60.80%	24.26%	27,752,648	11,070,786	Alf Landon	Rep.	61.0%
1940	Franklin D. Roosevelt	Dem.	449/531	84.56%	54.74%	9.96%	27,313,945	4,966,201	Wendell Willkie	Rep.	62.4%
1944	Franklin D. Roosevelt	Dem.	432/531	81.36%	53.39%	7.50%	25,612,916	3,594,987	Thomas E. Dewey	Rep.	55.9%
1948	Harry S. Truman	Dem.	303/531	57.06%	49.55%	4.48%	24,179,347	2,188,055	Thomas E. Dewey	Rep.	52.2%
1952	Dwight D. Eisenhower	Rep.	442/531	83.24%	55.18%	10.85%	34,075,529	6,700,439	Adlai Stevenson II	Dem.	62.3%
1956	Dwight D. Eisenhower	Rep.	457/531	86.06%	57.37%	15.40%	35,579,180	9,551,152	Adlai Stevenson II	Dem.	60.2%
1960 (Note: Official tallies for the popular vote are complicated by unpledged electors in Alabama.)	John F. Kennedy	Dem.	303/537	56.42%	49.72%	0.17%	34,220,984	112,827	Richard Nixon	Rep.	63.8%
1964	Lyndon B. Johnson	Dem.	486/538	90.33%	61.05%	22.58%	43,129,040	15,953,286	Barry Goldwater	Rep.	62.8%
1968	Richard Nixon	Rep.	301/538 (Note: Nixon originally earned 302 electoral votes, but lost one due to a faithless elector.)	55.95%	43.42%	0.70%	31,783,783	511,944	Hubert Humphrey	Dem.	62.5%
1972	Richard Nixon	Rep.	520/538 (Note: Nixon initially earned 521 electoral votes, but lost one due to a faithless elector.)	96.65%	60.67%	23.15%	47,168,710	17,995,488	George McGovern	Dem.	56.2%
1976	Jimmy Carter	Dem.	297/538	55.20%	50.08%	2.06%	40,831,881	1,683,247	Gerald Ford	Rep.	54.8%
1980	Ronald Reagan	Rep.	489/538	90.89%	50.75%	9.74%	43,903,230	8,422,115	Jimmy Carter	Dem.	54.2%
1984	Ronald Reagan	Rep.	525/538	97.58%	58.77%	18.21%	54,455,472	16,878,120	Walter Mondale	Dem.	55.2%
1988	George H. W. Bush	Rep.	426/538	79.18%	53.37%	7.72%	48,886,597	7,077,121	Michael Dukakis	Dem.	52.8%
1992	Bill Clinton	Dem.	370/538	68.77%	43.01%	5.56%	44,909,889	5,805,339	George H. W. Bush	Rep.	58.1%
1996	Bill Clinton	Dem.	379/538	70.45%	49.23%	8.51%	47,401,185	8,203,716	Bob Dole	Rep.	51.7%
2000	George W. Bush	Rep.	271/538	50.47%	47.87%	−0.51%	50,456,002	−543,895	Al Gore	Dem.	54.2%
2004	George W. Bush	Rep.	286/538	53.16%	50.73%	2.46%	62,040,610	3,012,166	John Kerry	Dem.	60.1%
2008	Barack Obama	Dem.	365/538	67.84%	52.93%	7.27%	69,498,516	9,550,193	John McCain	Rep.	61.6%
2012	Barack Obama	Dem.	332/538	61.71%	51.06%	3.86%	65,915,795	4,982,291	Mitt Romney	Rep.	58.6%
2016	Donald Trump	Rep.	304/538 (Note: Trump earned received 306 electoral votes, but lost 2 due to faithless electors.)	56.50%	46.09%	−2.09%	62,984,828	−2,868,686	Hillary Clinton	Dem.	60.1%
2020	Joe Biden	Dem.	306/538	56.88%	51.31%	4.45%	81,283,501	7,059,526	Donald Trump	Rep.	66.6%
2024	Donald Trump	Rep.	312/538	57.99%	49.80%	1.48%	77,302,580	2,284,967	Kamala Harris	Dem.	64.1%

== Timeline ==
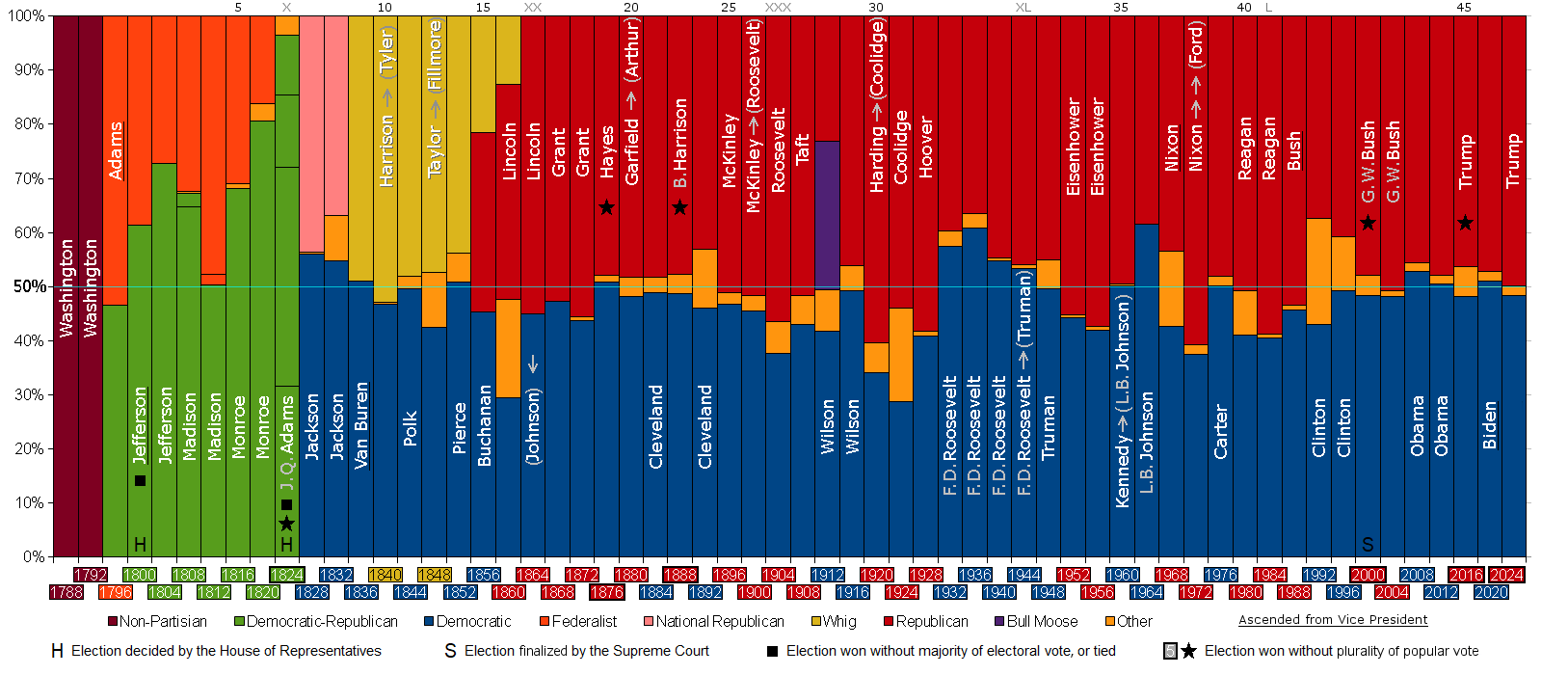
Presidents of the U.S. listed in a timeline graph of elections with results of the popular vote color coded for political parties from 1788 to 2024. A gray arrow points to the name of a person who became president without having been elected as president (9 total). The double arrow indicates becoming president without having been elected as vice president (e.g. Ford). 5 other former vice presidents are underlined (14 total). The top line indicates the presidency number (e.g. 40th for Reagan) with Roman numerals indicating election and term number.

== See also ==
- List of United States presidential candidates by number of votes received
- List of highest presidential election vote totals by U.S. state
- List of United States presidential elections by Electoral College margin
- List of United States presidential elections in which the winner lost the popular vote
- National Popular Vote Interstate Compact

== Bibliography ==
- Leip, David. Dave Leip's Atlas of U.S. Presidential Elections.
- Peters, Gerhard. Voter Turnout in Presidential Elections.
