= Voter turnout in United States presidential elections =

Aspect of election history

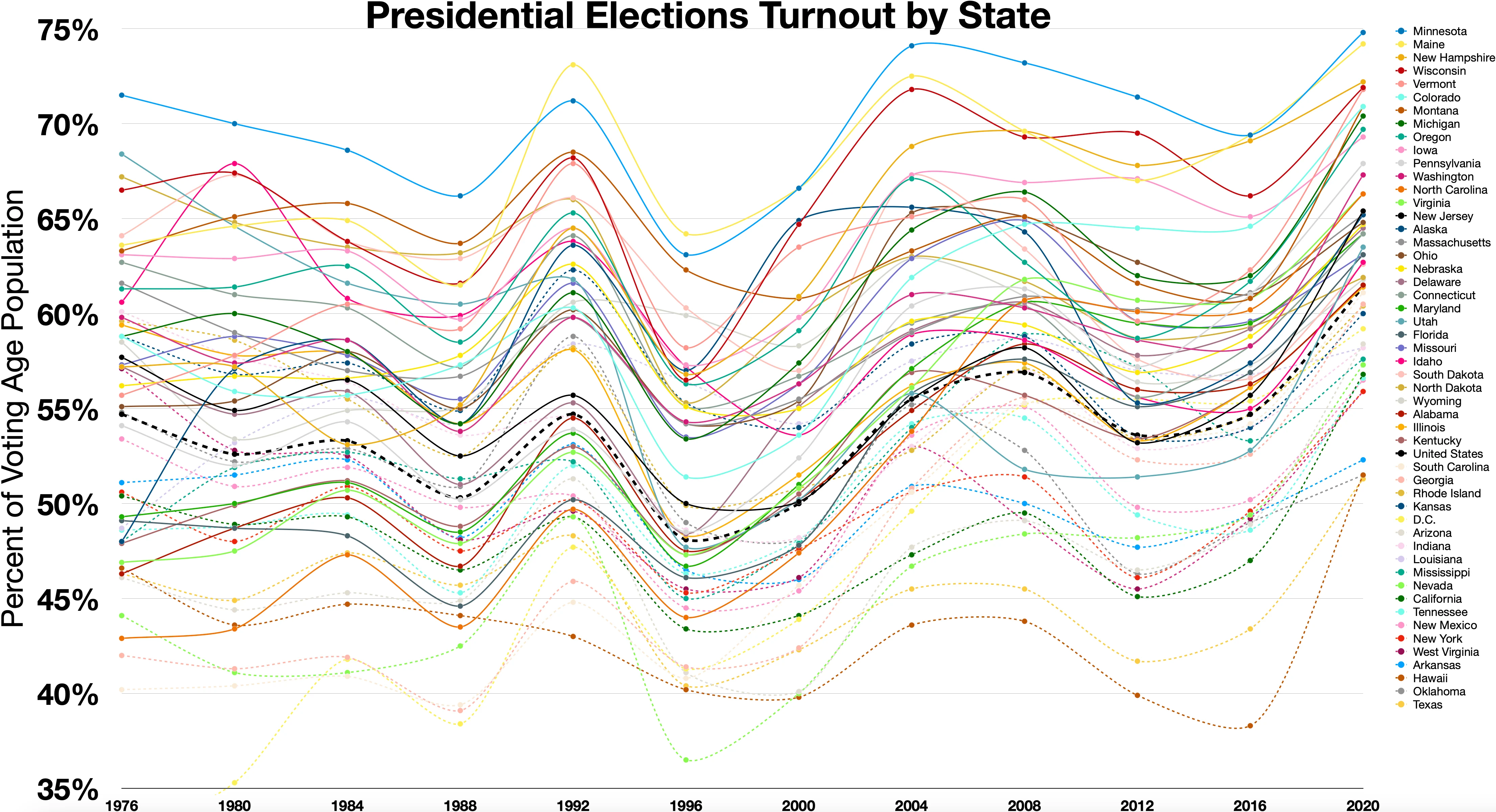
Presidential election turnout by state 1976–2020

In the United States, voter turnout is measured as a percentage, calculated by dividing the total number of votes cast by the voting age population (VAP) or, more recently, the voting eligible population (VEP). Voter turnout in the US has varied over time, between states, and between demographic groups. Turnout is higher for US presidential elections than for midterm elections. Voter turnout is generally lower in the United States than in other advanced democracies.

The historical trends in voter turnout in US presidential elections have been shaped by

- the gradual expansion of voting rights from the initial restriction to white male property owners aged 21 or older in the early years of the country's independence to all citizens aged 18 or older in the mid-20th century;
- policies that have made it easier or harder for eligible people to register and vote;
- the competitiveness of elections; and
- the mobilization efforts of parties, candidates and other organizations.

The composition of voter turnout has also changed with increased use of early voting and mail voting.

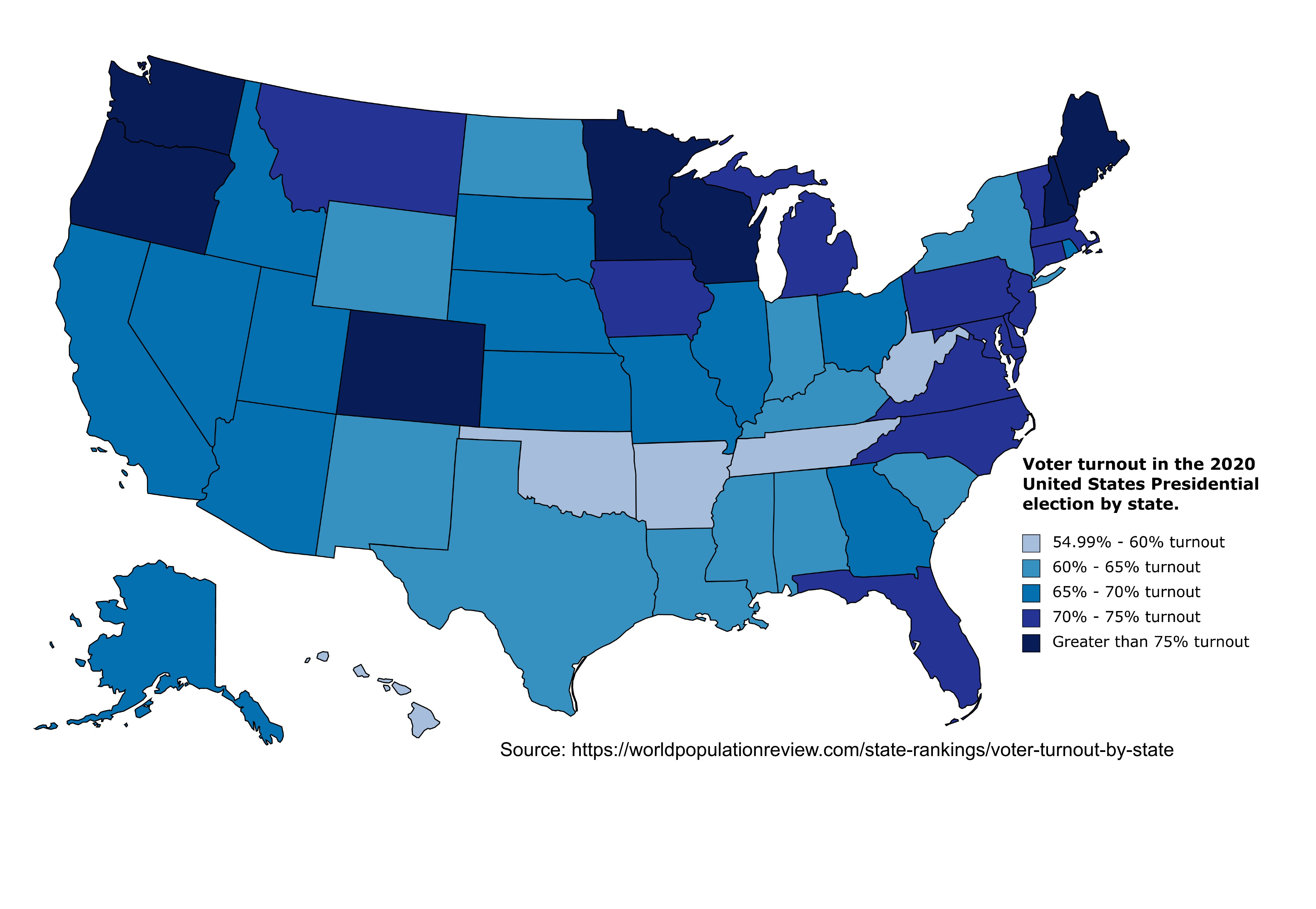
A map of voter turnout during the 2020 United States presidential election by state (no data for Washington, D.C.)

Approximately 209 million people were registered to vote in the 2020 presidential election and 158,427,986 ballots were submitted for president (75.8% of registered voters).

== Measuring turnout ==
For many years, voter turnout was reported as a percentage; the numerator being the total votes cast, or the votes cast for the highest office, and the denominator being the Voting Age Population (VAP), the Census Bureau's estimate of the number of persons 18 years old and older resident in the United States. The VAP, however, includes people who are not actually eligible to vote, either because they are not US citizens, or because a prior felony conviction bars them from voting under the laws in their state.

In their 2001 American Political Science Review article, Michael P. McDonald and Samuel Popkin developed a measure they called the Voting Eligible Population (VEP). The VEP uses "government statistical series to adjust for ineligible but included groups, such as noncitizens and felons, and eligible but excluded groups, such as overseas citizens." They argue that, when calculated as a percentage of the VEP instead of the VAP, voter turnout in the United States had not actually declined between 1972 and 2000, and that the "apparent decline" over that period was actually due to an increase in the number of inellgible voting-age people. In 1972, noncitizens and ineligible felons constituted about 2% of the VAP; by 2000, ineligible voters constituted nearly 10%. When adjusting for this, there were no identifiable turnout trends over that period.

Additionally, ineligible voters are not evenly distributed across the country. For example, roughly 15% of California's voting-age population is ineligible to vote, which confounds comparisons of states.

The following table shows the available data on turnout for the voting-age population (VAP) and the voting-eligible population (VEP) since 1932.

Election	Voting-age population (VAP)	Voting-eligible population (VEP)	Turnout	Turnout as % of VAP	Turnout as % of VEP	Winner votes	Runner-up votes	Winner as % of VEP	Runner-up as % of VEP
1932	75,768,000	—	39,816,522	52.55%	—	22,821,277	15,761,254	—	—
1936	80,055,000	—	45,646,817	57.02%	—	27,752,648	16,679,543	—	—
1940	84,319,000	—	49,815,312	59.08%	—	27,313,945	22,347,744	—	—
1944	90,599,000	—	48,025,684	53.01%	—	25,612,916	22,017,929	—	—
1948	94,877,000	—	48,833,680	51.47%	—	24,179,347	21,991,292	—	—
1952	98,113,000	—	61,551,919	62.74%	—	34,075,529	27,375,090	—	—
1956	102,753,000	—	62,027,040	60.37%	—	35,579,180	26,028,028	—	—
1960	108,458,000	—	68,836,385	63.47%	—	34,220,984	34,108,157	—	—
1964	110,604,000	—	70,097,935	63.38%	—	43,127,041	27,175,754	—	—
1968	116,353,000	—	73,026,831	62.76%	—	31,783,783	31,271,839	—	—
1972	136,203,000	—	77,625,152	56.99%	—	47,168,710	29,173,222	—	—
1976	146,548,000	—	81,603,346	55.68%	—	40,831,881	39,148,634	—	—
1980	157,085,000	147,870,815	86,496,851	55.06%	58.49%	43,903,230	35,480,115	29.69%	23.99%
1984	169,963,000	167,701,904	92,654,861	54.51%	55.25%	54,455,472	37,577,352	32.47%	22.41%
1988	178,098,000	173,579,281	91,586,725	51.42%	52.76%	48,886,597	41,809,476	28.16%	24.09%
1992	185,684,000	179,655,523	104,600,366	56.33%	58.22%	44,909,889	39,104,550	25%	21.77%
1996	193,652,000	186,347,044	96,389,818	49.77%	51.73%	47,401,185	39,197,469	25.44%	21.03%
2000	202,609,000	194,331,436	105,405,100	52.02%	54.24%	50,456,002	50,999,897	25.96%	26.24%
2004	219,508,000	203,483,455	122,349,480	55.74%	60.13%	62,040,610	59,028,444	30.49%	29.01%
2008	225,499,000	213,313,508	131,406,895	58.27%	61.6%	69,498,516	59,948,323	32.58%	28.1%
2012	235,248,000	222,474,111	129,139,997	54.9%	58.05%	65,915,795	60,933,504	29.63%	27.39%
2016	245,502,000	230,931,921	136,669,237	55.67%	59.18%	62,984,828	65,853,514	27.27%	28.52%
2020	252,274,000	242,690,810	158,427,986	62.8%	65.28%	81,283,501	74,223,975	33.49%	30.58%
2024^{*}	264,798,961	243,803,423	156,766,239	59.2%	64.3%	77,303,568	75,019,230	31.71%	30.77%

2024 numbers estimated by the Election Lab at the University of Florida as of March 2, 2026. This estimate will be revised as additional data becomes available.

== Turnout by US state ==
The Constitution originally gave states the authority to decide who had the right to vote, and the power to decide the time, place, and manner of elections. Despite Constitutional amendments prohibiting restrictions of the franchise by race, sex, or against people over 18, and outlawing the poll tax, and other national legislation, states still administer voter registration and elections in ways which can impact turnout, and variations in competitiveness between the states lead to variations in turnout.

2020 voter turnout by state
State	Total ballots cast	Voting eligible population	2020 general election turnout as a percentage of VEP
United States	159,738,337	242,077,783	65.99%
Alabama	2,325,000	3,782,861	61.46%
Alaska	361,400	529,649	68.23%
Arizona	3,420,585	5,133,804	66.63%
Arkansas	1,223,675	2,178,328	56.17%
California	17,785,151	25,840,035	68.83%
Colorado	3,295,666	4,297,225	76.69%
Connecticut	1,861,086	2,655,214	70.09%
Delaware	509,241	745,131	68.34%
District of Columbia	346,491	503,118	68.87%
Florida	11,144,855	15,742,624	70.79%
Georgia	5,023,159	7,490,838	67.06%
Hawaii	579,784	1,047,466	55.35%
Idaho	878,527	1,352,914	64.94%
Illinois	6,050,000	9,095,238	66.52%
Indiana	3,068,542	5,025,421	61.06%
Iowa	1,700,130	2,360,125	72.04%
Kansas	1,375,125	2,112,458	65.10%
Kentucky	2,150,954	3,339,511	64.41%
Louisiana	2,169,401	3,382,286	64.14%
Maine	828,305	1,106,276	74.87%
Maryland	3,066,945	4,416,326	69.45%
Massachusetts	3,658,005	5,129,755	71.31%
Michigan	5,579,317	7,615,249	73.27%
Minnesota	3,292,997	4,157,411	79.21%
Mississippi	1,325,000	2,185,433	60.63%
Missouri	3,026,028	4,620,290	65.49%
Montana	612,075	857,955	71.34%
Nebraska	966,920	1,400,069	69.06%
Nevada	1,407,754	2,191,188	64.25%
New Hampshire	814,499	1,101,294	73.96%
New Jersey	4,635,585	6,435,019	72.04%
New Mexico	928,230	1,534,600	60.49%
New York	8,690,139	14,081,957	61.71%
North Carolina	5,545,848	7,811,002	71.00%
North Dakota	364,251	577,567	63.07%
Ohio	5,974,121	8,906,277	67.08%
Oklahoma	1,565,000	2,875,494	54.43%
Oregon	2,413,890	3,204,224	75.33%
Pennsylvania	6,958,551	9,950,392	69.93%
Rhode Island	522,488	828,194	63.09%
South Carolina	2,533,010	3,914,642	64.71%
South Dakota	427,529	651,554	65.62%
Tennessee	3,065,000	5,174,225	59.24%
Texas	11,350,000	18,982,171	59.79%
Utah	1,515,845	2,255,175	67.22%
Vermont	370,968	520,641	71.25%
Virginia	4,523,142	6,300,717	71.79%
Washington	4,116,894	5,465,496	75.33%
West Virginia	802,726	1,403,699	57.19%
Wisconsin	3,310,000	4,410,780	75.04%
Wyoming	278,503	430,161	64.74%

== History of voter turnout ==
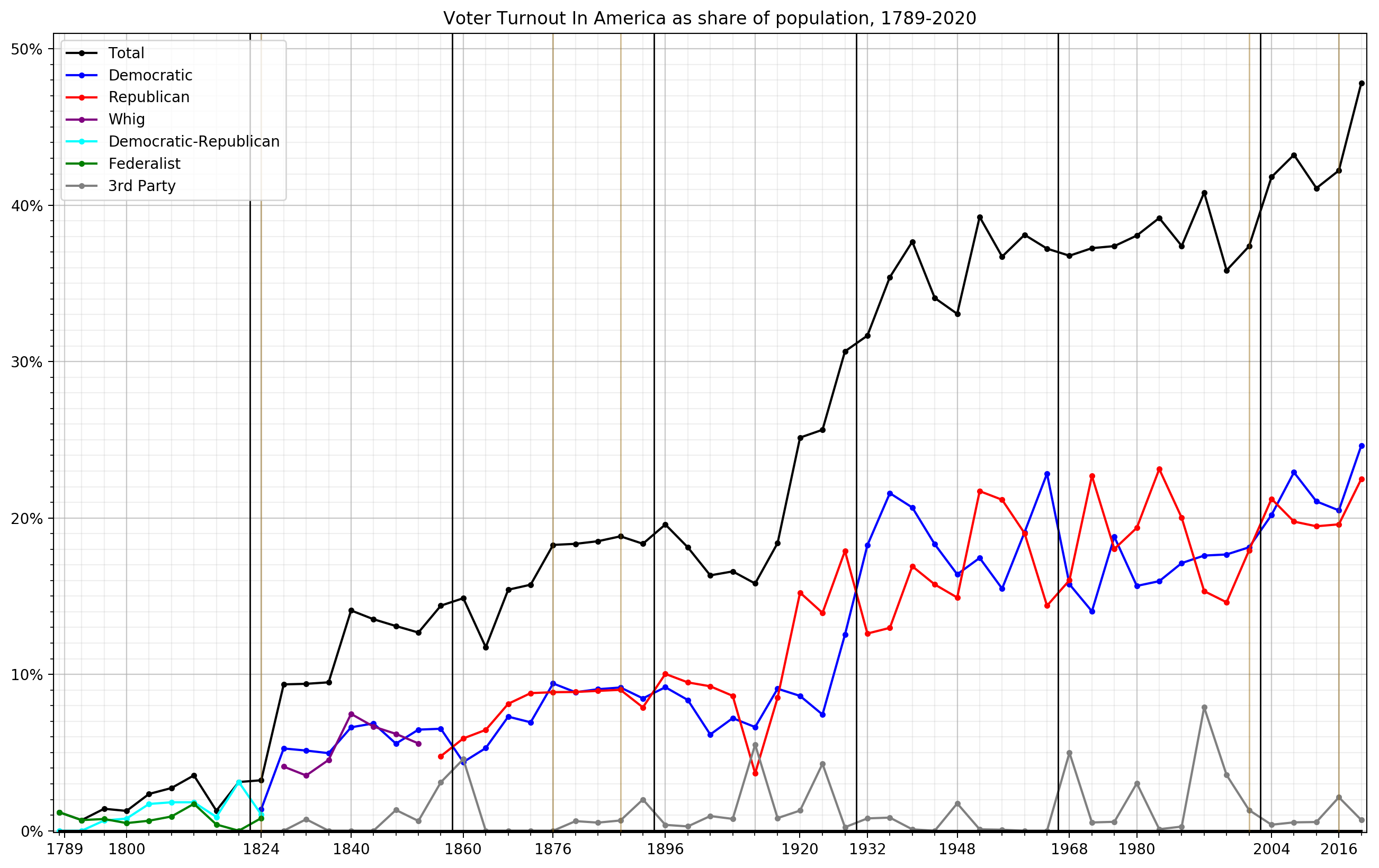
U.S. presidential election popular vote totals as a percentage of the total U.S. population. The black line is the total turnout, while colored lines reflect votes for major parties. This chart represents the number of votes cast as a percentage of the total population, and does not compare either of those quantities with the percentage of the population that was eligible to vote.

=== Early 19th century: Universal white male suffrage ===
The gradual expansion of the right to vote from only property-owning men to including all white men over 21 was an important movement in the period from 1800 to 1830. Older states with property restrictions dropped them, namely all but Rhode Island, Virginia and North Carolina by the mid-1820s. No new states had property qualifications, although three had adopted tax-paying qualifications – Ohio, Louisiana, and Mississippi, of which only in Louisiana were these significant and long-lasting. The process was peaceful and widely supported, except in Rhode Island. In Rhode Island, the Dorr Rebellion of the 1840s demonstrated that the demand for equal suffrage was broad and strong, although the subsequent reform included a significant property requirement for any resident born outside of the United States. However, free black men lost voting rights in several states during this period.

The fact that a man was now legally allowed to vote did not necessarily mean he routinely voted. He had to be pulled to the polls, which became the most important role of the local parties. These parties systematically sought out potential voters and brought them to the polls. Voter turnout soared during the 1830s, reaching about 80% of the adult male population in the 1840 presidential election. Tax-paying qualifications remained in only five states by 1860 – Massachusetts, Rhode Island, Pennsylvania, Delaware, and North Carolina.

Another innovative strategy for increasing voter participation and input followed. Prior to the presidential election of 1832, the Anti-Masonic Party conducted the nation's first presidential nominating convention. Held in Baltimore, Maryland, September 26–28, 1831, it transformed the process by which political parties select their presidential and vice-presidential candidates.

=== 1870s: African American male suffrage ===
The passage of the Fifteenth Amendment to the United States Constitution in 1870 affirmed African American men the right to vote. The first record of a black man voting after the amendment's adoption was when Thomas Mundy Peterson cast his vote on March 31, 1870, in Perth Amboy, New Jersey, in a referendum election, adopting a revised city charter. During Reconstruction (1865–1877), sixteen black men served in Congress, and 2,000 black men served in elected local state and federal positions. While this historic expansion of rights resulted in significant increases in the eligible voting population and may have contributed to the increases in the proportion of votes cast for president as a percentage of the total population during the 1870s, there does not seem to have been a significant long-term increase in the percentage of eligible voters who turn out for the poll. United States vs. Reese (1876), the first supreme court decision interpreting the fifteenth amendment, may have set the cause of African American male suffrage back again. In United States v. Reese (1876), the Supreme Court upheld limitations on suffrage, including poll taxes, literacy tests, and a grandfather clause that exempted citizens from other voting requirements if their grandfathers had been registered voters. The Court also stated that the amendment "does not confer the right of suffrage to anyone," but it "invests citizens of the United States with the right of exemption from discrimination." This subtle distinction between suffrage and the right to be exempt from discrimination may have legitimized the disenfranchisement of black people. The disenfranchisement of most African Americans and many poor whites in the South during the years 1890–1910 likely contributed to the decline in overall voter turnout percentages during those years visible in the chart above.

=== Early 1920s: Women's suffrage ===
There was no systematic collection of voter turnout data by gender at a national level before 1964, but smaller local studies indicate a low turnout among female voters in the years following women's suffrage in the United States. For example, a 1924 study of voter turnout in Chicago found that "female Chicagoans were far less likely to have visited the polls on Election Day than were men in both the 1920 presidential election (46% vs. 75%) and the 1923 mayoral contest (35% vs. 63%)." The study compared reasons given by male and female non-voters and found that female non-voters were more likely to cite general indifference to politics and ignorance or timidity regarding elections than male non-voters, and that female voters were less likely to cite fear of loss of business or wages. Most significantly, however, 11% of female non-voters in the survey cited a "Disbelief in woman's voting" as the reason they did not vote.

With the exception of 1916, voter turnout declined in the decades preceding women's suffrage. Despite this decline, from the 1900s until 1920, several states passed laws supporting women's suffrage. Women were granted the right to vote in Wyoming in 1869, before the territory had become a full state in the union. In 1889, when the Wyoming constitution was drafted in preparation for statehood, it included women's suffrage. Thus Wyoming was also the first full state to grant women the right to vote. In 1893, Colorado was the first state to amend an existing constitution in order to grant women the right to vote, and several other states followed, including Utah and Idaho in 1896, Washington State in 1910, California in 1911, Oregon, Kansas, and Arizona in 1912, Alaska and Illinois in 1913, Montana and Nevada in 1914, New York in 1917; Michigan, South Dakota, and Oklahoma in 1918. Each of these suffrage laws expanded the body of eligible voters, and because women were less likely to vote than men, each of these expansions created a decline in voter turnout rates, culminating with the extremely low turnouts in the 1920 and 1924 elections after the passage of the Nineteenth Amendment.

The lack of systematic data tracking voter turnout in presidential elections before 1964 makes speculation on the voting gender gap before 1964 challenging. The data from 1964 indicates that the gender gap waned from 1964 until 1976. From 1976 onward, women have consistently turned out in higher numbers than men for presidential elections.

== Age, education, and income ==
For the 2024 presidential election, the U.S. Census Bureau estimated that 65.3 percent of the citizen voting-age population, about 154 million people, voted. Turnout was 66.9 percent among women and 63.7 percent among men. By educational attainment, turnout was 82.5 percent among people with an advanced degree, 77.2 percent among bachelor's degree holders, and 52.5 percent among high school graduates. The estimates came from the Current Population Survey Voting and Registration Supplement and may differ from administrative data because of survey nonresponse, vote misreporting, question wording, and survey administration.

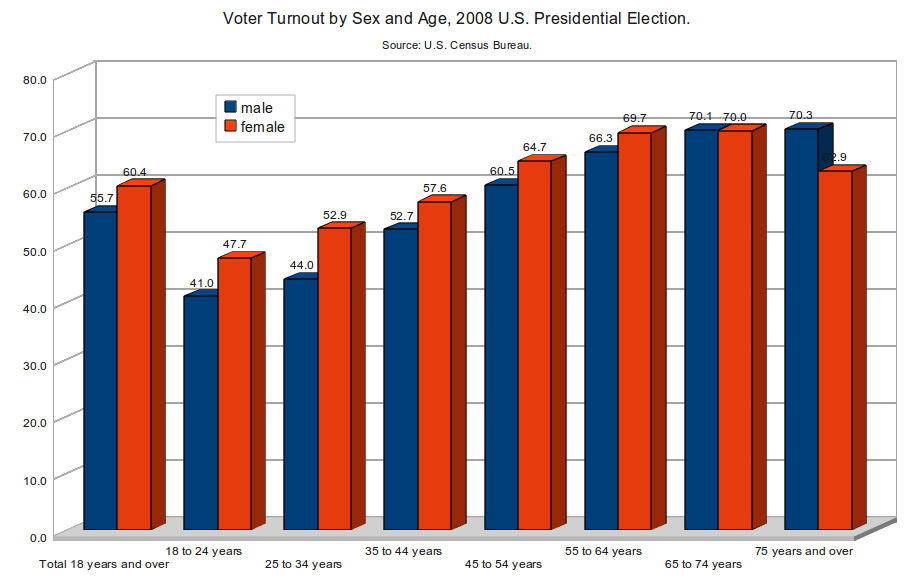
Voter turnout by sex and age for the 2008 U.S. Presidential Election

Age, income, and educational attainment are significant factors affecting voter turnout. Educational attainment is perhaps the best predictor of voter turnout, and in the 2008 election, those holding advanced degrees were three times more likely to vote than those with less than high school education. Income correlated well with the likelihood of voting as well. The income correlation may be because of a correlation between income and educational attainment, rather than a direct effect of income.

=== Age ===
The age difference is associated with youth voter turnout. Some argue that "age is an important factor in understanding voting blocs and differences" on various issues. Others argue that young people are typically "plagued" by political apathy and thus do not have strong political opinions. As strong political opinions may be considered one of the reasons behind voting, political apathy among young people is arguably a predictor for low voter turnout. One study found that potential young voters are more willing to commit to voting when they see pictures of younger candidates running for elections/office or voting for other candidates, surmising that young Americans are "voting at higher and similar rates to other Americans when there is a candidate under the age of 35 years running". As such, since most candidates running for office are pervasively over the age of 35 years, youth may not be actively voting in these elections because of a lack of representation or visibility in the political process.

Recent decades have seen increasing concern over the fact that youth voter turnout is consistently lower than turnout among older generations. Several programs to increase the rates of voting among young people – such as MTV's "Rock the Vote" (founded in 1990) and the "Vote or Die" initiative (starting in 2004) – may have marginally increased turnouts of those between the ages of 18 and 25 to vote. However, the Stanford Social Innovation Review found no evidence of a decline in youth voter turnout. In fact, they argue that "Millennials are turning out at similar rates to the previous two generations when they face their first elections."

=== Education ===
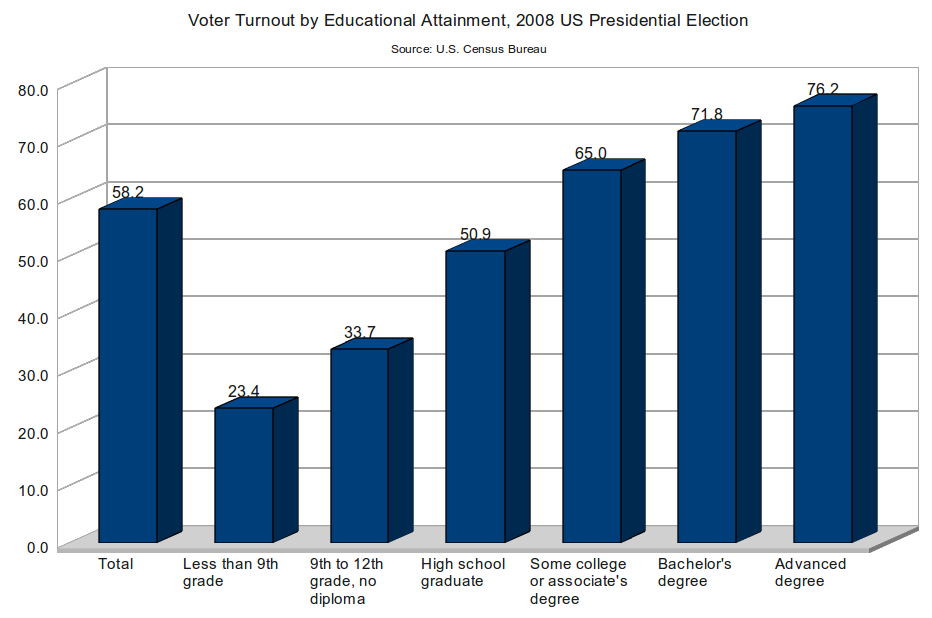
Rates in voting in the 2008 U.S. Presidential Election by educational attainment presented by this chart.

Education is another factor considered to have a major impact on voter turnout rates. A study by Burman investigated the relationship between formal education levels and voter turnout. This study demonstrated the effect of rising enrollment in college education circa 1980s, which resulted in an increase in voter turnout. However, "this was not true for political knowledge"; a rise in education levels did not have any impact in identifying those with political knowledge (a signifier of civic engagement) until the 1980s election, when college education became a distinguishing factor in identifying civic participation. This article poses a multifaceted perspective on the effect of education levels on voter turnout. Based on this article, one may surmise that education has become a more powerful predictor of civic participation, discriminating more between voters and non-voters. However, this was not true for political knowledge; education levels were not a signifier of political knowledge. Gallego (2010) also contends that voter turnout tends to be higher in localities where voting mechanisms have been established and are easy to operate – i.e. voter turnout and participation tends to be high in instances where registration has been initiated by the state and the number of electoral parties is small.

One may contend that ease of access – and not education level – may be an indicator of voting behavior. Presumably larger, more urban cities will have greater budgets/resources/infrastructure dedicated to elections, which is why youth may have higher turnout rates in those cities versus more rural areas. Though youth in larger (that is, urban) cities tend to be more educated than those in rural areas (Marcus & Krupnick, 2017), perhaps there is an external variable (i.e. election infrastructure) at play. Smith and Tolbert's (2005) research reiterates that the presence of ballot initiatives and portals within a state have a positive effect on voter turnout. Another correlated finding in his study (Snyder, 2011) was that education is less important as a predictor of voter turnout in states than tend to spend more on education. Moreover, Snyder's (2011) research suggests that students are more likely to vote than non-students. It may be surmised that an increase of state investment in electoral infrastructure facilitates and education policy and programs results in increase voter turnout among youth.

=== Income ===
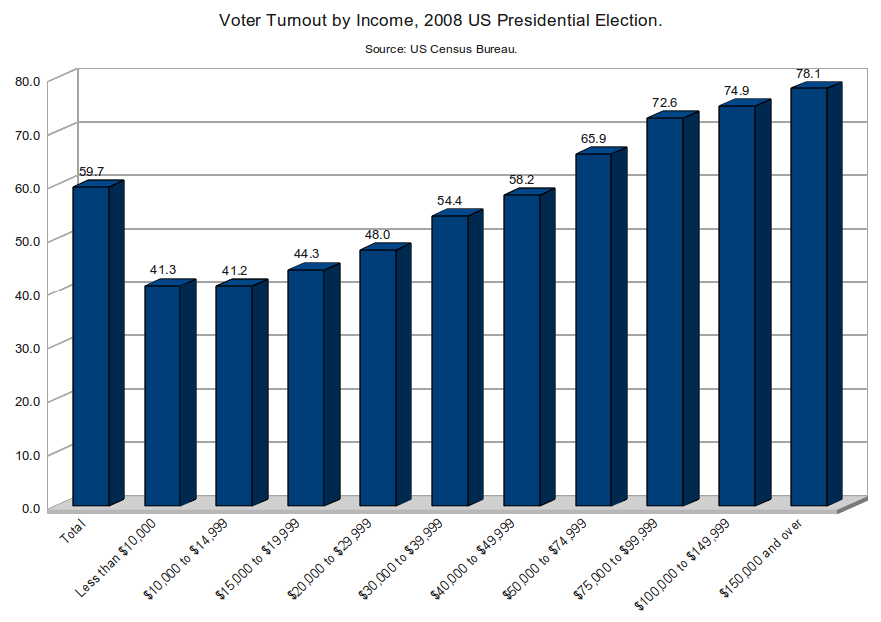
Rates of voting in the 2008 U.S. Presidential Election by income

Wealthier people tend to vote at higher rates. Harder and Krosnick (2008) contend that some of the reasons for this may be due to "differences in motivation or ability (sometimes both)" (Harder and Krosnick, 2008), or that less wealthy people have less energy, time, or resources to allot towards voting. Another potential reason may be that more affluent people believe they have more at stake if they don't vote than those with less income.

== Gender gap ==
Since 1980, the voting gender gap has completely reversed, with a higher proportion of women voting than men in each of the last nine presidential elections. The Center for American Women and Politics summarizes how this trend can be measured differently both in terms of proportion of voters to non-voters, and in terms of the bulk number of votes cast. "In every presidential election since 1980, the proportion of eligible female adults who voted has exceeded the proportion of eligible male adults who voted [...]. In all presidential elections prior to 1980, the voter turnout rate for women was lower than the rate for men. The number of female voters has exceeded the number of male voters in every presidential election since 1969..." This gender gap has been a determining factor in several recent presidential elections, as women have been consistently about 15% more likely to support the candidate of the Democratic Party than the Republican candidate in each election since 1996.

== Race and ethnicity ==
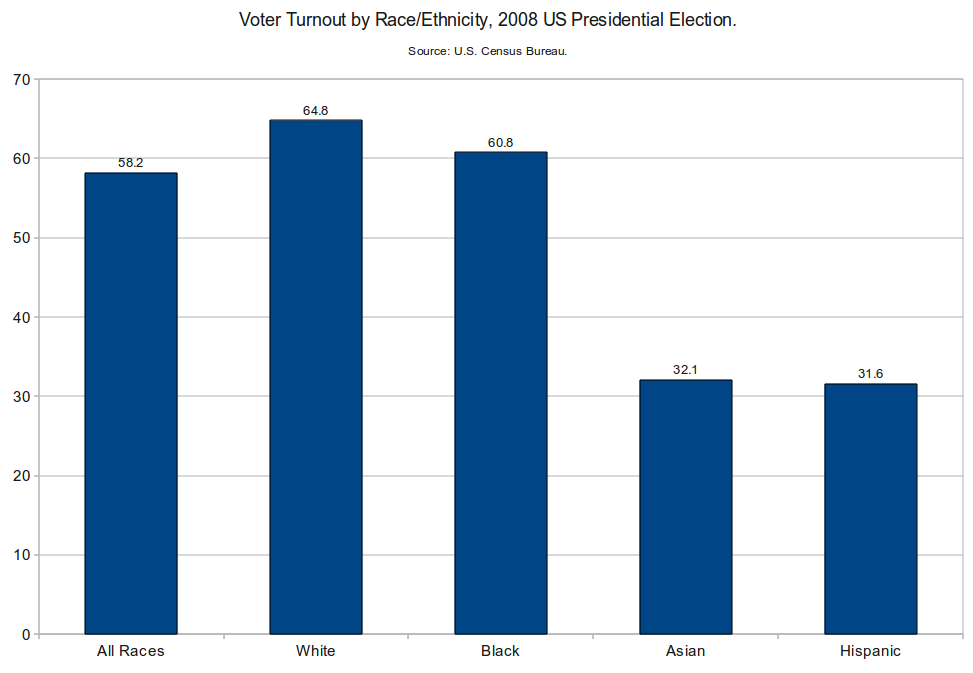
Voter turnout in the 2008 U.S. Presidential Election by race/ethnicity

Race and ethnicity has had an effect on voter turnout in recent years, with data from recent elections such as 2008 showing much lower turnout among people identifying as Hispanic or Asian ethnicity than other voters (see chart to the right). One factor impacting voter turnout of Black Americans is that, as of the 2000 election, 13% of Black American males are reportedly ineligible to vote nationwide because of a prior felony conviction; in certain states – Florida, Alabama, and Mississippi – disenfranchisement rates for Black American males in the 2000 election were around 30%.

== Shifting trends in how voters turn out ==
Recent elections have seen more voters take advantage of early voting and mail-in voting. There was an increase in votes cast before election day from 2016 to 2020, with 40% of votes cast prior to election day in 2016 and 69% in 2020 (although the COVID-19 pandemic also played a factor in how voters cast their ballots). Both mail-in and early in-person voting increased from the 2016 to 2020 general election.

== See also ==
- Voter turnout
- Voter registration in the United States
