= Marianne Githens =

American political scientist (1936-2018)

- Born: November 10, 1936; New York City, US
- Died: February 27, 2018 (aged 81)
- Spouse: Stanley Zenith Mazer
- Children: 4

Academic background
- Education: Marymount Manhattan College
- Alma mater: London School of Economics
- Thesis: The separation of powers in the working constitution of the Fourth Republic (1960)

Academic work
- Discipline: Political scientist
- Institutions: Goucher College
- Notable works: A Portrait of Marginality

Marianne Githens (November 10, 1936 – February 27, 2018) was an American political scientist, feminist, and author. She was an Elizabeth Conolly Todd Distinguished Professor and the co-founder of the Women's Study Program at Goucher College. In 1977, she co-authored the anthology A Portrait of Marginality.

== Early life and education ==
Githens was born in New York City to Anita Keller, a schoolteacher and life-long resident of Cedarhurst, New York and John H. Githens, an accountant. She was raised in Cedarhurst, New York. She had one brother, John Lawrence. She earned a Bachelor of Arts degree from Marymount Manhattan College. After graduation Githens moved to London, where she lived with an emigre German Jewish family near Hampstead Heath. Githens studied at the London School of Economics, earning a doctorate in European political institutions and French political thought in 1960. Her dissertation was titled The Separation of Powers in the Working Constitution of the Fourth Republic.

== Career ==
Githens taught full-time at Goucher College from 1965 to 2014. She taught part-time until 2016. She was recognized by peers as a "pioneer scholar" in the field of women in politics and public policy. Githens was an advocate for inclusion, diversity, and equity. This advocacy included women's rights and for urban neighborhoods in Baltimore. She was a co-founder of the Women's Studies Program at Goucher and served as the chair of the political science program. In 1977, Githens and Jewel Prestage authored the anthology A Portrait of Marginality. In 1993, Githens was commissioned to write a report on women in Europe by the European Commission's Commission of the European Communities for Program Development. In 2000, Githens was named Goucher College's Elizabeth Conolly Todd Distinguished Professor due to her "leadership, scholarship, teaching and community activism." The appointment provides five years of funds to pursue research.

== Personal life ==
Githens was a feminist and enjoyed fashion and jewelry. She married Stanley Zenith Mazer in 1973. Mazer was a dean and professor at Baltimore City Community College. The couple met during Parren Mitchell's campaign where they were both were interested in racial equality. Githens and Mazer moved into the Mount Vernon neighborhood in Baltimore in 1994. Githens had two sons and two daughters.

Githens died February 27, 2018, of a heart attack at the age of 83. She was survived by her children, brother, and five grandchildren.

== Awards and honors ==
Githens received multiple awards from Goucher College, including the Outstanding Teaching Award, Caroline Doebler Bruckerl Faculty Award, and a Human Rights Scholar Award. She was recognized by Marymount Manhattan College with a Distinguished Alumna Award. In 1997, Githens and her husband were presented a preservation project award from Baltimore Heritage.

== Selected works ==
=== Articles ===
- Githens, Marianne; Prestage, Jewel (December 1978). "Women State Legislators: Styles and Priorities". Policy Studies Journal. 7 (2): 264–270. doi:10.1111/j.1541-0072.1978.tb01766.x.
- Githens, Marianne (December 1994). "Teaching Against the Double Couplet of Problem/Victim". PS: Political Science and Politics. 27 (4): 721–722. doi:10.1017/s1049096500041858. JSTOR 420381.
- Githens, Marianne (1996). "Getting Appointed to the State Court: The Gender Dimension". Journal of Women, Politics & Policy. 15 (4): 1–24. doi:10.1300/J014v15n04_01.
- Deardorff, Michelle Donaldson; Githens, Marianne; Halva-Neubauer, Glen; Hudson, William; Reeher, Grant; Seyb, Ronald (December 2001). "Everything You Always Wanted to Know about Getting and Keeping a Job at a Private Liberal Arts College, but Your Graduate Advisor Didn't Tell You". PS: Political Science and Politics. 34 (4): 856–857. doi:10.1017/S1049096501000865. JSTOR 1350286. S2CID 154254648.

=== Books ===
- Githens, Marianne; Prestage, Jewel Limar (1977). A Portrait of Marginality: the Political Behavior of the American Woman. D. McKay Co. ISBN 978-0679303336.
- Githens, Marianne; Norris, Pippa; Lovenduski, Joni (1994). Different Roles, Different Voices: Women and Politics in the United States and Europe. Harper Collins College. ISBN 978-0065013061.
- Githens, Marianne (2013). Contested Voices: Women Immigrants in Today's World. Springer. ISBN 978-1137363503.
- Githens, Marianne; Stetson, Dorothy McBride, eds. (2013). Abortion Politics: Public Policy in Cross-Cultural Perspective. Routledge. ISBN 978-1136660221.
