= A Portrait of Marginality =

1977 book edited by Marianne Githens and Jewel Prestage

- First edition
- Author: Marianne Githens; Jewel Prestage
- Language: English
- Genre: Nonfiction
- Published: 1977
- Publisher: David McKay Publications
- Publication place: United States
- Media type: Print
- Pages: 428
- ISBN: 9780679303336
- OCLC: 2957830

A Portrait of Marginality is a 1977 book edited by Marianne Githens and Jewel Prestage on the political behavior of American women. It is an anthology of 22 papers on women's participation or lack of it in American politics. It includes a section specifically on African American women in politics.

== Reception ==
The book was met by a positive reception. A review in Contemporary Sociology concluded that the book "provides a needed addition to the growing literature on the political woman."

Diane Kincaid of the Western Political Quarterly wrote that the volume "will stand as a milestone in marking the shift from description and prescription to empirical explanation and theoretical development." Kincaid added that the section on African American women" succeeds in vividly challenging the easy subsumption of "black women" into "all women" as a political behavior group."

Jane S. Jaquette of Occidental College calls the book a "welcome addition to the sparse literature of the field," concluding that it is an "essential anthology."

The volume was reviewed in Social Work, Canadian Journal of Political Science, and Polity.
