= Jewel Prestage =

American political scientist and activist

- Born: Jewel Limar; August 12, 1931; Hutton, Louisiana, U.S.
- Died: August 1, 2014 (aged 82)
- Spouse: James Jordan Prestage (m. 1953)
- Children: 5, including Grady Prestage

Academic background
- Education: Southern University
- Alma mater: University of Iowa

Academic work
- Discipline: Political scientist, Citizen activist, Educator
- Institutions: Prairie View A&M University; Southern University
- Notable works: A Portrait of Marginality

Jewel Limar Prestage (August 12, 1931 – August 1, 2014) was an American political scientist, citizen activist, educator, mentor, and author. She is the first African-American woman to receive a doctorate in political science in the United States. Prestage mentored many others in her field, which is how she received the title, "The Mother of Black Political Science." Prestage conducted ample research on African Americans' role in the political process. In 1977, she co-authored the anthology A Portrait of Marginality, which examines the political socialization of Black women.

== Early life and education ==
Jewel Limar Prestage was born in Hutton, a small community in Vernon Parish, Louisiana, to Sallie Bell Johnson and Brudis Leroy Limar, Sr. She was one of 16 children, although only 10 siblings lived to adulthood. She moved at a young age to Alexandria, Louisiana where she was baptized at the True Vine Missionary Baptist Church. At the age of 16, Prestage graduated as the valedictorian from Peabody High School.

She started in the fall of 1948 at Southern University. Prestage was inducted into the Alpha Kappa Alpha sorority through the Beta Psi chapter in 1950. She majored in political science and graduated summa cum laude in 1951. Prestage met her husband, Dr. James Jordan Prestage, while attending Southern University. They married in 1953, after he returned from his military service in the Korean War.

She wanted to continue into graduate school, but African Americans were not allowed admission to the only Louisiana public university that offered a doctoral program in political science, Louisiana State University. In order to maintain segregation, the state legislature paid $375 per semester for Prestage to attend graduate school at the University of Iowa. In 1952, she received a master's degree and completed a doctorate in 1954 at the age of 22. She was inducted into Pi Sigma Alpha, the National Political Science Honor Society.

As a student at the University of Iowa, she recalled not having any African American professors or mentors, so she relied on Southern University for Black male political science mentors. There were no female political science mentors at Southern University that Prestage could find. Prestage strived to remedy this lack of representation throughout her career.

== Career ==
After completing her doctorate, Prestage taught at Prairie View A&M University for two years. Then, she returned to Southern University as a faculty member. At her alma mater, Prestage pioneered many initiatives that brought prominent political science figures to Southern University. Some of these figures included ambassadors to nations like Kenya and Sierra Leone as well as the President of the United Nations General Assembly. As a faculty member, she mentored many political science majors who went on to become political scientists, lawyers, and state representatives. Her mentees were given the name "Jewel's Gems" at Southern University. She eventually became a departmental chair and the dean of the School of Public Policy and Urban Affairs. When she retired in 1989, Southern University recognized Prestage with the honor of Distinguished Professor Emeritus, because of her work at the university.

Prestage contributed many works to the political science community that bridged the gap in the lack of research about African Americans in American politics. In 1977, Prestage and Marianne Githens authored the anthology A Portrait of Marginality, one of Prestage's most notable works. Another one of her articles is "The Case of African American Women in Politics," which explored more about Black Women's role in the political arena. Prestage also participated in the founding of the National Conference of Black Political Scientists. In 2002, the National Conference of Black Political Scientists (NCOBPS) recognized Prestage as one of the founders of the organization. They also created an award in her honor, the Jewel Limar Prestage Faculty Mentorship Award, which is presented to political science professors who demonstrate exemplary leadership and mentorship at a Historically Black College or University.

Jewel Prestage was also recognized on a national level for her work in education and politics. President Jimmy Carter appointed Prestage to the National Advisory Council on Women’s Educational Programs, because of her astounding impact on education within her community. One of the major acts that was executed during her role was the Women’s Educational Equity Act addressing sexual harassment and women's rights.

== Activism ==
Not only did Prestage hold an influential role in higher education, but she also invested in the education of young students. She wanted to transform the political socialization of grade school students, so she worked with the National Defense Education Act Civics Institute (1967-1969) to enhance the role of teachers. Results of her work showed that many Louisiana teachers were better prepared to educate their students about becoming productive citizens of society. Prestage was also a leader in her community. She registered many Black people to vote in Louisiana with the Second Ward Voters League and worked with newly elected Black officeholders as the director of the Louisiana Center to Assist Black Elected Officials.

=== Articles ===
- Githens, Marianne; Prestage, Jewel (December 1978). "Women State Legislators: Styles and Priorities". Policy Studies Journal. 7 (2): 264–270. doi:10.1111/j.1541-0072.1978.tb01766.x.

=== Books ===
- National Endowment for the Humanities (1972). Bolner, James; Prestage, Jewel (eds.). Law & Human Values: A Symposium. Baton Rouge, Louisiana.
- Githens, Marianne; Prestage, Jewel Limar (1977). A Portrait of Marginality: the Political Behavior of the American Woman. D. McKay Co. ISBN 978-0679303336.
