= Voting gender gap in the United States =

A gender gap in voting typically refers to the difference in the percentage of men and women who vote for a particular candidate. It is calculated by subtracting the percentage of women supporting a candidate from the percentage of men supporting a candidate (e.g., if 55 percent of men support a candidate and 44 percent of women support the same candidate, there is an 11-point gender gap).

The gender gap and the women's vote are distinct concepts. The gender gap refers to between groups differences (i.e., how men and women differ from each other in their support for a candidate). The women's vote refers to within-groups differences (i.e., the difference in women's support for leading party's candidate and trailing party's candidate). Media reports often conflate the women's vote with the gender gap, inaccurately referring to the women's vote as the gender gap. Gender gaps are not within-the-gender differences in candidate support, nor are they the aggregate total of men's and women's within gender differences (e.g., men +10 Republican and women +12 Democratic is not equivalent to a 22-point gender gap).

There has been a notable gender gap in the United States at least since the 1980 presidential election. Women tend to favor Democratic candidates while men tend to favor Republican ones; the gap has ranged from 11 points in 1996 and 2016 to 4 points in 1992. The gap has been attributed to various causes, including a shifting of loyalty among men to the Republican Party and generally higher support for liberal positions among women. The effect of the gender gap is magnified by the fact that women vote in higher numbers than men.

== History ==
Very little was written about gender differences in vote choice for the 60 years following the ratification of the Nineteenth Amendment in 1920. Although the Amendment gave women the right to vote in national elections, many women were still reluctant participants in the electoral process. However, post-hoc analyses of American National Election Studies data indicate that majorities of women supported different candidates than majorities of men at least since the organization began to collect data on American elections. Through 1960, these preferences skewed Republican, with women more likely to support Thomas Dewey in 1948, Dwight D. Eisenhower in 1952 and 1956, and Richard M. Nixon in 1960. However, men were more likely to support Barry Goldwater's 1964 Republican candidacy, as well as Nixon's 1968 and 1972 campaigns. There was little evidence of a difference in male and female vote choice in the post-Watergate 1976 election between Gerald Ford and Jimmy Carter.

This changed with the 1980 presidential election between Carter and Republican nominee Ronald Reagan. For the first time, pollsters noted gender differences in candidate preference even before Election Day. These predictions were realized when the final vote tallies revealed was an 8 percentage point gap in women's support for Carter over Reagan. Eleanor Smeal, then director of the National Organization for Women, is credited as being the first to refer to these differences as "gender gaps". In post-election analyses, Smeal and others attributed the gap to the Republican Party's reluctance to endorse feminist positions. Namely, the party refused to endorse the ratification of the Equal Rights Amendment to the U.S. Constitution. In addition, the party's 1980 platform took an anti-abortion position, making it the first major party to take a specific stance on the increasingly politicized issue.

=== In subsequent presidential elections ===
The size of the gender gap in presidential elections has ranged from a low of 4 percentage points in the 1992 election between George H.W. Bush, Bill Clinton, and third-party candidate Ross Perot to 11 percentage points in both the 1996 election between Clinton and Bob Dole and the 2016 contest between Donald Trump and Hillary Clinton. In 2020, 57% of women and 45% of men supported Biden, resulting in a gender gap of 12 percentage points. Gender gaps in presidential elections usually average about 8 percentage points, though they may vary with the candidates, platforms, and salient issues in each contest.

Gender Gaps in Presidential Elections, 1980–2020
Year	Republican Candidate	Democratic Candidate	Gender Gap	Winner
2024	Donald Trump	Kamala Harris	10 points	Trump (R)
2020	Donald Trump	Joe Biden	12 points	Biden (D)
2016	Donald Trump	Hillary Clinton	11 points	Trump (R)
2012	Mitt Romney	Barack Obama	10 points	Obama (D)
2008	John McCain	Barack Obama	8 points	Obama (D)
2004	George W. Bush	John Kerry	7 points	Bush (R)
2000	George W. Bush	Al Gore	10 points	Bush (R)
1996	Bob Dole	Bill Clinton	11 points	Clinton (D)
1992	George H.W. Bush	Bill Clinton	4 points	Clinton (D)
1988	George H.W. Bush	Michael Dukakis	7 points	Bush (R)
1984	Ronald Reagan	Walter Mondale	6 points	Reagan (R)
1980	Ronald Reagan	Jimmy Carter	8 points	Reagan (R)

=== In congressional and other contests ===
The development of a gender gap in congressional and gubernatorial elections lagged behind its presidential counterpart, though by the mid-1990s, its magnitude reached relatively similar proportions, averaging approximately 9 percentage points. It has persisted in recent midterm election years, measuring 4 percentage points in 2006, 6 percentage points in 2010, and 10 percentage points in 2014.

== Causes ==
=== Partisanship ===
The earliest differences in vote choice were attributed to women's higher rates of religiosity, as well as their lower levels of education, income, and rates of union membership. These traits, it was believed, made women more conservative than men, and less likely to identify with President Franklin Roosevelt's Democratic New Deal coalition.

After the 1980 election, scholars began to reassess the causes of the apparent shift in women's party loyalties toward the Democratic Party. Researchers hypothesized that these changes may have been the result of an increasing emphasis on women's issues such as the Equal Rights Amendment and abortion. However, there was little evidence that men and women held different positions on these wedge issues. Self-identified feminist men and women, however, did appear to take different stances than their non-feminist counterparts.

After more careful examination, scholars discovered that the reemergence and growth of gender gaps in American vote choice and party identification were less the result of women becoming more liberal and more supportive of the Democratic Party, but rather men's gradual movement toward the Republican Party. This shift in party loyalties began during the 1960s, when the Democratic Party under the leadership of Lyndon Johnson began to take increasingly assertive positions on civil rights issues. It became increasingly pronounced in late 1980s and early 1990s, as Southern white men, who formerly identified as Southern Democrats, shifted their loyalties to the Republican Party. Men are more likely than women to identify as independent-leaning, while women are more likely to identify as weak partisans.

=== Issue positions ===
Some scholars argue that key differences in men's and women's partisanship and vote choice are largely attributable to their different positions on political issues. In particular, scholars have found that women are more likely to support a larger national government, increased gun control regulations, the legalization of same-sex marriage, and pro-choice positions on abortion. Women also tend to express higher levels of support on compassion issues such as welfare and health policy, issue positions that scholars argue may be an extension of women's greater propensity to feel and express empathy. Consistent with this explanation, the gender gap tends to be larger among those with higher education levels, who are more likely to know the parties' divergent positions on these issues.

However, on some policy issues, such as school prayer and drug use, women tend to be more conservative than their male counterparts. In still other issue areas, there is no compelling evidence for a significant gap between men and women.

== Consequences ==
The significance of the gender gap in American politics is magnified because women generally turn out to vote at higher rates than men. Scholars argue that this is the result of a greater sense of civic duty among women than men. In addition, due to their longer life expectancy, women also comprise a larger percentage of registered voters than men. Thus, the effects of even small gender gaps in men's and women's vote choice can be magnified, particularly in close elections.

Women, however, continue to have lower levels of political knowledge, interest, and engagement. They are also less likely to run for office and are underrepresented in elected political positions at the local, state, and national levels—leading to concerns over how a lack of proportionate representation can limit the influence of women on politics in the United States.
