= 2025 United States Electoral College vote count =

Last step of 2024 presidential election

- January 6, 2025

538 members of the Electoral College 270 electoral votes needed to win

Nominee	Donald Trump	Kamala Harris
Party	Republican	Democratic
Home state	Florida	California
Running mate	JD Vance	Tim Walz
Electoral vote	312	226
States carried	31 + ME-02	19 + DC + NE-02
- Objections made to the electoral college votes of the 2024 U.S. presidential election. No objections
President before election
Joe Biden
Democratic
Elected President
Donald Trump
Republican

The count of the Electoral College ballots during a joint session of the 119th United States Congress, pursuant to the Electoral Count Act and Electoral Count Reform and Presidential Transition Improvement Act of 2022, on January 6, 2025, was held as the final step that confirmed President-elect Donald Trump's victory in the 2024 presidential election over incumbent Vice President Kamala Harris. It was the first Republican victory since 1988 that was not contested by Democrats in Congress and the first election since 2012 that was not contested at all in Congress.

Harris was the first incumbent vice president since Democrat Al Gore in 2001 to have presided over an electoral vote count in which they were a losing presidential candidate on the ballot.

== Background ==
=== Electoral College ===
The United States Electoral College is the group of presidential electors required by the Article Two of the Constitution to form every four years for the sole purpose of electing the president and vice president. Each state appoints electors according to its legislature, equal in number to its congressional delegation (senators and representatives). Federal office holders cannot be electors. Of the current 538 electors, an absolute majority of 270 or more electoral votes is required to elect the president and vice president. As stated in the Twelfth Amendment to the United States Constitution, if no candidate for either office achieves an absolute majority there, a contingent election is held by the United States House of Representatives to elect the president, and by the United States Senate to elect the vice president; under this amendment, only the election of 1824 failed to produce a majority for president, and the election of 1836 for vice president.

Each state and the District of Columbia produces two documents to be forwarded to Congress, a certificate of ascertainment and a certificate of vote. A certificate of ascertainment is an official document that identifies the state's appointed College electors and the tally of the final popular vote count for each candidate in that state in a presidential election; the certificate of ascertainment is submitted after an election by the governor of each state to the archivist of the United States and others, in accordance with 3 U.S.C. §§ 6–14 and the Electoral Count Act. Within the United States' electoral system, the certificates "[represent] a crucial link between the popular vote and votes cast by electors". The certificates must bear the state seal and the governor's signature. Staff from the Office of the Federal Register ensure that each certificate contains all legally required information. When each state's appointed electors meet to vote (on the first Tuesday after the second Wednesday of December), they sign and record their vote on a certificate of vote, which are then paired with the certificate of ascertainment, which together are sent to be opened and counted by Congress.

The 12th Amendment mandates Congress assemble in joint session to count the electoral votes and declare the winners of the election. The Electoral Count Act, a federal law enacted in 1887, further established specific procedures for the counting of the electoral votes by the joint Congress. The session is ordinarily required to take place on January 6 in the calendar year immediately following the meetings of the presidential electors. Since the 20th Amendment, the newly elected joint Congress declares the winner of the election; all elections before 1936 were determined by the outgoing Congress.

United States Code provides that, during the vote count, objections can be made via a petition signed by at least twenty percent of each house of Congress arguing that "The vote of one or more electors has not been regularly given," i.e. not in accord with the constitution. (Note: The Insurrection Clause of the Fourteenth Amendment was discussed by media as a potential topic of debate in light of Trump's attempt to overturn the results of the 2020 presidential election.) The certification of a state's vote can be rejected only if both houses of Congress, debating separately, vote to accept an objection by a majority in each house. If the objection is approved by both houses, the state's votes are not included in the count, ostensibly providing a potential path for the losing candidate to receive the most votes. Individual votes can also be objected to, and are also not counted. If there are no objections or all objections are overruled, the presiding officer simply includes a state's votes, as declared in the certificate of vote, in the official tally. After the certificates from all states are read and the respective votes are counted, the presiding officer announces the final state of the vote. This announcement concludes the joint session and formalizes the recognition of the president-elect and of the vice president-elect. The senators then depart from the House chamber. The final tally is printed in the Senate and House journals.

=== Legislative changes ===
On December 23, 2022, the 117th Congress passed the Electoral Count Reform and Presidential Transition Improvement Act. President Joe Biden signed it into law six days later. Before this law, an objection to an electoral certificate needed to be signed by a senator and a representative in order to be put to a vote; the new law now required the minimum support of one-fifth of each chamber in order to raise a valid objection. The 2025 proceeding was the first Electoral College vote count to which this law applies.

=== Presidential transition teams ===
Before a presidential election, candidates must plan to ensure government continuity if they take office. In August 2024, Harris approached Yohannes Abraham to lead her Harris presidential transition team, while Trump selected Howard Lutnick and Linda McMahon as co-chairs of his Trump presidential transition team.

=== Security preparations ===
On September 11, 2024, the Department of Homeland Security designated the vote count as a National Special Security Event.

Before the November election, Democrats on the House Committee on Administration, which has oversight of federal election laws, planned how they would deal with a hypothetical obstruction attempt by the Republicans.

=== Slates of electors ===
Some people who had volunteered as fake electors in 2020 were appointed to serve as legitimate electors for Trump should he win certain states in 2024. As of October 2024, there were six such electors in Michigan, five in Pennsylvania, two in Nevada, and one in New Mexico.

=== Electoral College vote ===
The Electoral College voted on December 17, 2024. All electors voted as pledged, and there were no faithless electors.

== Joint session of Congress ==
Counting of Electoral College votes 2025

A joint session of Congress convened at 1:00 PM EST on January 6, 2025, presided over by Vice President Harris, where the votes of the state electors were formally certified in the House chamber. The certification witnessed no objections on behalf of any Congressional member, and was not subject to any irregular restrictions. It notably took place in the presence of Vice President-elect JD Vance (then serving as a senator). All 434 members of the House serving at the time were in attendance of the certification.

State	EV	EV winners	Objection raised by
Alabama	9	Trump/Vance	No objections
Alaska	3	Trump/Vance	No objections
Arizona	11	Trump/Vance	No objections
Arkansas	6	Trump/Vance	No objections
California	54	Harris/Walz	No objections
Colorado	10	Harris/Walz	No objections
Connecticut	7	Harris/Walz	No objections
Delaware	3	Harris/Walz	No objections
District of Columbia	3	Harris/Walz	No objections
Florida	30	Trump/Vance	No objections
Georgia	16	Trump/Vance	No objections
Hawaii	4	Harris/Walz	No objections
Idaho	4	Trump/Vance	No objections
Illinois	19	Harris/Walz	No objections
Indiana	11	Trump/Vance	No objections
Iowa	6	Trump/Vance	No objections
Kansas	6	Trump/Vance	No objections
Kentucky	8	Trump/Vance	No objections
Louisiana	8	Trump/Vance	No objections
Maine	4	3 for Harris/Walz; 1 for Trump/Vance (Note: Electoral votes for Maine and Nebraska are allocated between statewide vote and congressional districts.)	No objections
Maryland	10	Harris/Walz	No objections
Massachusetts	11	Harris/Walz	No objections
Michigan	15	Trump/Vance	No objections
Minnesota	10	Harris/Walz	No objections
Mississippi	6	Trump/Vance	No objections
Missouri	10	Trump/Vance	No objections
Montana	4	Trump/Vance	No objections
Nebraska	5	4 for Trump/Vance; 1 for Harris/Walz	No objections
Nevada	6	Trump/Vance	No objections
New Hampshire	4	Harris/Walz	No objections
New Jersey	14	Harris/Walz	No objections
New Mexico	5	Harris/Walz	No objections
New York	28	Harris/Walz	No objections
North Carolina	16	Trump/Vance	No objections
North Dakota	3	Trump/Vance	No objections
Ohio	17	Trump/Vance	No objections
Oklahoma	7	Trump/Vance	No objections
Oregon	8	Harris/Walz	No objections
Pennsylvania	19	Trump/Vance	No objections
Rhode Island	4	Harris/Walz	No objections
South Carolina	9	Trump/Vance	No objections
South Dakota	3	Trump/Vance	No objections
Tennessee	11	Trump/Vance	No objections
Texas (Note: With Texas' 40 electoral votes, Donald Trump and JD Vance surpassed the 270 electoral vote threshold, securing victory in the electoral vote count.)	40	Trump/Vance	No objections
Utah	6	Trump/Vance	No objections
Vermont	3	Harris/Walz	No objections
Virginia	13	Harris/Walz	No objections
Washington	12	Harris/Walz	No objections
West Virginia	4	Trump/Vance	No objections
Wisconsin	10	Trump/Vance	No objections
Wyoming	3	Trump/Vance	No objections

== See also ==
- 2024 United States presidential election
- Second presidential transition of Donald Trump
- Second inauguration of Donald Trump
