= 2001 United States Electoral College vote count =

Final step of 2000 presidential election

- January 6, 2001

538 members of the Electoral College 270 electoral votes needed to win

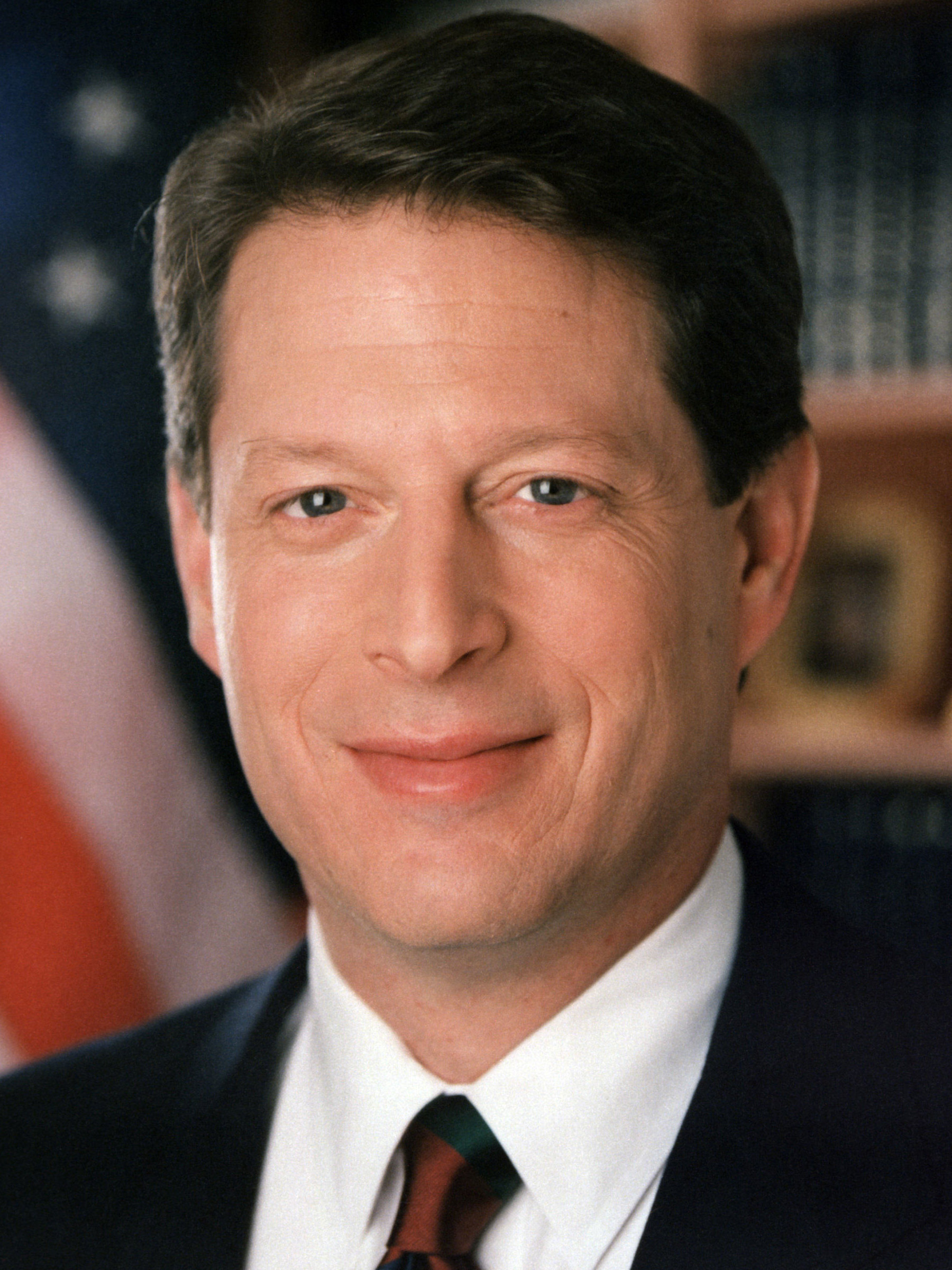

Nominee	George W. Bush	Al Gore	Undervote
Party	Republican	Democratic
Home state	Texas	Tennessee
Running mate	Dick Cheney	Joe Lieberman
Electoral vote	271	266 (Note: 267 electors pledged to the Gore/Lieberman ticket were elected; however, an elector from the District of Columbia cast a blank ballot for president and vice president, bringing the ticket's total number of electoral votes to 266.)	1
States carried	30	20 + DC	0
- Objections made to the electoral college votes of the 2000 U.S. presidential election. No objections Objection(s) attempted (Note: Pursuant to the Electoral Count Act of 1887, an objection requires the assent of a Representative and a Senator in order to be sustained before Congress. In all these cases, the attempted objections failed to receive assent from a Senator.)
President before election
Bill Clinton
Democratic
Elected President
George W. Bush
Republican

The count of the Electoral College ballots during a joint session of the 107th United States Congress, pursuant to the Electoral Count Act, on January 6, 2001, was held as the final step to confirm then President-elect George W. Bush's victory in the 2000 presidential election over incumbent Vice President Al Gore.

This event was notable in that Gore, who had narrowly failed to secure the deciding state of Florida after a series of controversial recount proceedings, presided over his own election loss in his role as President of the Senate. Multiple Democratic representatives attempted to object to the certification of Bush's Florida electoral votes throughout the session, however no senator from either party signed onto the objections.

Gore was the last incumbent vice president until Democrat Kamala Harris in 2025 to have presided over an electoral vote count in which they were a losing presidential candidate on the ballot.

== Background ==
=== Electoral College ===
The United States Electoral College is the group of presidential electors required by the Article Two of the Constitution to form every four years for the sole purpose of electing the president and vice president. Each state appoints electors according to its legislature, equal in number to its congressional delegation (senators and representatives). Federal office holders cannot be electors. Of the current 538 electors, an absolute majority of 270 or more electoral votes is required to elect the president and vice president. As stated in the Twelfth Amendment to the United States Constitution, if no candidate for either office achieves an absolute majority there, a contingent election is held by the United States House of Representatives to elect the president, and by the United States Senate to elect the vice president; under this amendment, only the election of 1824 failed to produce a majority for president, and the election of 1836 for vice president.

Each state and the District of Columbia produces two documents to be forwarded to Congress, a certificate of ascertainment and a certificate of vote. A certificate of ascertainment is an official document that identifies the state's appointed College electors and the tally of the final popular vote count for each candidate in that state in a presidential election; the certificate of ascertainment is submitted after an election by the governor of each state to the archivist of the United States and others, in accordance with 3 U.S.C. §§ 6–14 and the Electoral Count Act. Within the United States' electoral system, the certificates "[represent] a crucial link between the popular vote and votes cast by electors". The certificates must bear the state seal and the governor's signature. Staff from the Office of the Federal Register ensure that each certificate contains all legally required information. When each state's appointed electors meet to vote (on the first Monday after the second Wednesday of December), they sign and record their vote on a certificate of vote, which are then paired with the certificate of ascertainment, which together are sent to be opened and counted by Congress.

The 12th Amendment mandates Congress assemble in joint session to count the electoral votes and declare the winners of the election. The Electoral Count Act, a federal law enacted in 1887, further established specific procedures for the counting of the electoral votes by the joint Congress. The session is ordinarily required to take place on January 6 in the calendar year immediately following the meetings of the presidential electors. Since the 20th Amendment, the newly elected joint Congress declares the winner of the election; all elections before 1936 were determined by the outgoing Congress.

A state's certificate of vote can be rejected only if both Houses of Congress, debating separately, vote to accept an objection by a majority in each House. If the objection is approved by both Houses, the state's votes are not included in the count. Individual votes can also be objected to, and are also not counted. If there are no objections or all objections are overruled, the presiding officer simply includes a state's votes, as declared in the certificate of vote, in the official tally. After the certificates from all states are read and the respective votes are counted, the presiding officer simply announces the final state of the vote. This announcement concludes the joint session and formalizes the recognition of the president-elect and of the vice president-elect. The senators then depart from the House chamber. The final tally is printed in the Senate and House journals.

=== Faithless elector ===
Barbara Lett-Simmons, a Democratic elector from the District of Columbia, cast a blank ballot in the Electoral College rather than vote for Al Gore for president and Joe Lieberman for vice president as was expected, in protest of the District of Columbia's lack of a voting representative in Congress. The ballot, the first of its kind since 1864, was intended to protest what she referred to as the federal district's "colonial status". She described her blank ballot as an act of civil disobedience, not an act of a faithless elector; she supported Gore and said she would have voted for him if she had thought he had a chance to win.

== Joint Session of Congress ==
=== Objection to certification of Florida's electoral votes ===
Counting of Electoral College votes 2001

Before the counting of the electoral votes began, Democratic representative Peter Deutsch of Florida attempted a point of order: "Mr. Vice President, we have just completed the closest election in American history." Deutsch was promptly gavelled down by Gore on the grounds that no debate is allowed in the joint session. The count started in a relatively normal fashion. After California's 54 votes were counted in favor of the Democratic ticket, Gore "playfully pumped his fist in the air", according to The New York Times. Teller Chaka Fattah, before reading Florida's certificate, commented, "This is the one we have all been waiting for."

Representative Alcee Hastings of Florida was the first to object: "Mr. President, and I take great pride in calling you that, I must object because of the overwhelming evidence of official misconduct, deliberate fraud, and an attempt to suppress voter turnout." In response, Gore reminded Hastings that no debate is allowed during the joint session and asked if Hastings's request was in writing and signed by a senator. Hastings replied that the objection was in writing but not signed by a member of the Senate. Two additional Floridian representatives objected next. Carrie Meek failed to present the signature of a senator, as did Corrine Brown. Brown alleged that 16,000 African Americans were disenfranchised in Duval County before then returning to her seat.

Eddie Bernice Johnson and Sheila Jackson Lee, both of Texas, in addition to Elijah Cummings of Maryland, were the next three representatives to attempt an objection. None, however were able to produce the signature of a senator. Maxine Waters of California then rose, objecting to the allegedly "fraudulent" electoral votes of Florida and stating that she did "not care that it is not signed by a Member of the Senate." Waters' attempted objection failed, with Gore commenting that "the rules do care, and the signature of a Senator is required." Representatives Barbara Lee of California, Cynthia McKinney of Georgia, Patsy Mink of Hawaii and Eva Clayton of North Carolina all attempted objections next, failing to produce any signatures from a senator.

McKinney then rose for a second time to request that the House of Representatives withdraw from the ongoing joint session of Congress to "allow consideration of the facts surrounding the slate of electors from Florida", claiming that the signature of a senator would not be required to proceed with her motion. Gore did not recognize McKinney's claim, citing 3 U.S.C. § 15-18, and the motion was not received. Representative Bob Filner of California rose to attempt an objection but failed to produce a senator's signature. Representative Waters rose again to concur with McKinney's request that the House withdraw from the joint session, which similarly was not received. Representative Jesse Jackson Jr. of Illinois then attempted an objection, which also failed.

Hastings rose again to ask whether it would be possible to "appeal the ruling of the Chair", which Gore dismissed in accordance with 3 U.S.C. § 17. Before returning to his seat, Hastings commented, "We did all we could, Mr. President," prompting laughter from Gore. Representative Waters then rose for a third time to ask for unanimous consent that Congress would debate the counting of Florida's electoral votes. Many of the assembled members of Congress laughed at Waters' suggestion, and Gore replied that the "request should not even be entertained." Finally, Jackson Jr. rose for a second time to request that a Democratic senator sign onto an objection to Florida's votes, which none did. There were no further objections, and Florida's electoral votes were then counted. As the tellers began reading the electoral votes of the next state, Georgia, numerous Democratic representatives walked out of the joint session.

State	Electoral votes	Winner	Faithless electors	Objection raised by
Alabama	9	Bush/Cheney	None	No Objections
Alaska	3	Bush/Cheney	None	No Objections
Arizona	8	Bush/Cheney	None	No Objections
Arkansas	6	Bush/Cheney	None	No Objections
California	54	Gore/Lieberman	None	No Objections
Colorado	8	Bush/Cheney	None	No Objections
Connecticut	8	Gore/Lieberman	None	No Objections
Delaware	3	Gore/Lieberman	None	No Objections
District of Columbia	3	Gore/Lieberman	1; cast blank ballot	No Objections
Florida	25	Bush/Cheney	None	Barbara Lee (D-CA-9); Maxine Waters (D-CA-35); Bob Filner (D-CA-50); Cynthia McKinney (D-GA-04); Patsy Mink (D-HI-2); Corrine Brown (D-FL-3); Carrie Meek (D-FL-17); Alcee Hastings (D-FL-23); Jesse Jackson Jr. (D-IL-2); Elijah Cummings (D-MD-7); Eva Clayton (D-NC-1); Sheila Jackson Lee (D-TX-18); Eddie Bernice Johnson (D-TX-30)
Georgia	13	Bush/Cheney	None	No Objections
Hawaii	4	Gore/Lieberman	None	No Objections
Idaho	4	Bush/Cheney	None	No Objections
Illinois	22	Gore/Lieberman	None	No Objections
Indiana	12	Bush/Cheney	None	No Objections
Iowa	7	Gore/Lieberman	None	No Objections
Kansas	6	Bush/Cheney	None	No Objections
Kentucky	8	Bush/Cheney	None	No Objections
Louisiana	9	Bush/Cheney	None	No Objections
Maine	4	Gore/Lieberman	None	No Objections
Maryland	10	Gore/Lieberman	None	No Objections
Massachusetts	12	Gore/Lieberman	None	No Objections
Michigan	18	Gore/Lieberman	None	No Objections
Minnesota	10	Gore/Lieberman	None	No Objections
Mississippi	7	Bush/Cheney	None	No Objections
Missouri	11	Bush/Cheney	None	No Objections
Montana	3	Bush/Cheney	None	No Objections
Nebraska	5	Bush/Cheney	None	No Objections
Nevada	4	Bush/Cheney	None	No Objections
New Hampshire	4	Bush/Cheney	None	No Objections
New Jersey	15	Gore/Lieberman	None	No Objections
New Mexico	5	Gore/Lieberman	None	No Objections
New York	33	Gore/Lieberman	None	No Objections
North Carolina	14	Bush/Cheney	None	No Objections
North Dakota	3	Bush/Cheney	None	No Objections
Ohio	21	Bush/Cheney	None	No Objections
Oklahoma	8	Bush/Cheney	None	No Objections
Oregon	7	Gore/Lieberman	None	No Objections
Pennsylvania	23	Gore/Lieberman	None	No Objections
Rhode Island	4	Gore/Lieberman	None	No Objections
South Carolina	8	Bush/Cheney	None	No Objections
South Dakota	3	Bush/Cheney	None	No Objections
Tennessee	11	Bush/Cheney	None	No Objections
Texas	32	Bush/Cheney	None	No Objections
Utah	5	Bush/Cheney	None	No Objections
Vermont	3	Gore/Lieberman	None	No Objections
Virginia	13	Bush/Cheney	None	No Objections
Washington	11	Gore/Lieberman	None	No Objections
West Virginia	5	Bush/Cheney	None	No Objections
Wisconsin	11	Gore/Lieberman	None	No Objections
Wyoming (Note: With Wyoming's 3 electoral votes, George W. Bush and Dick Cheney surpassed the 270 electoral vote threshold, securing victory in the electoral vote count.)	3	Bush/Cheney	None	No Objections

== Legacy ==
Mike Pence (R-IN-2), who had taken office three days earlier on January 3, was among the house representatives while Al Gore was presiding over his own election loss. Exactly 20 years later, on January 6, 2021, Pence, then-incumbent vice president, presided over the electoral count of his own election defeat, despite president Donald Trump urging him to intervene. Politico reported that Pence had been inspired by Gore's actions in 2001.

== See also ==
- 2000 United States presidential election
- Presidential transition of George W. Bush
- First inauguration of George W. Bush
- Bush v. Gore
