= 2005 United States Electoral College vote count =

Final step of 2004 presidential election

- January 6, 2005

538 members of the Electoral College 270 electoral votes needed to win
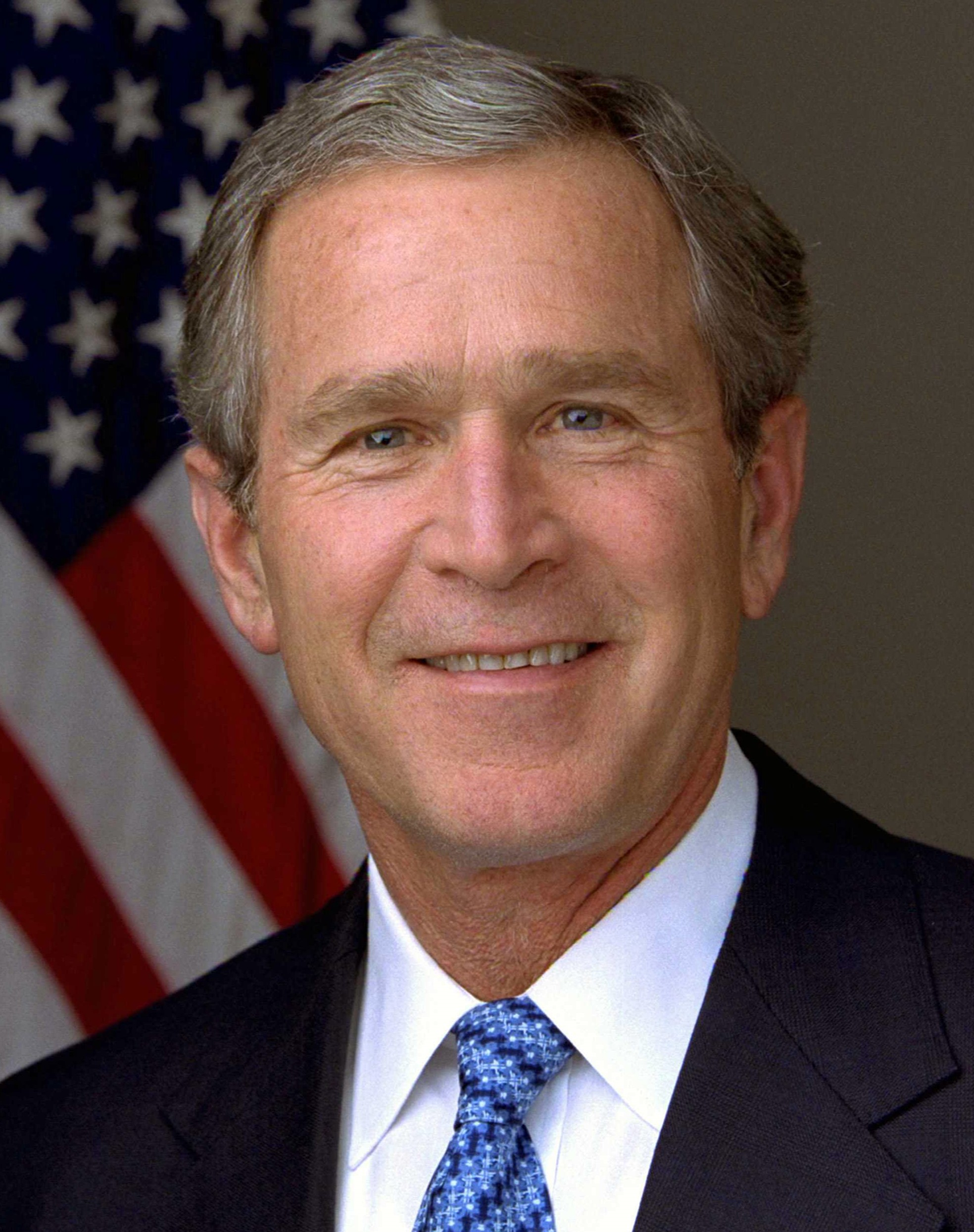

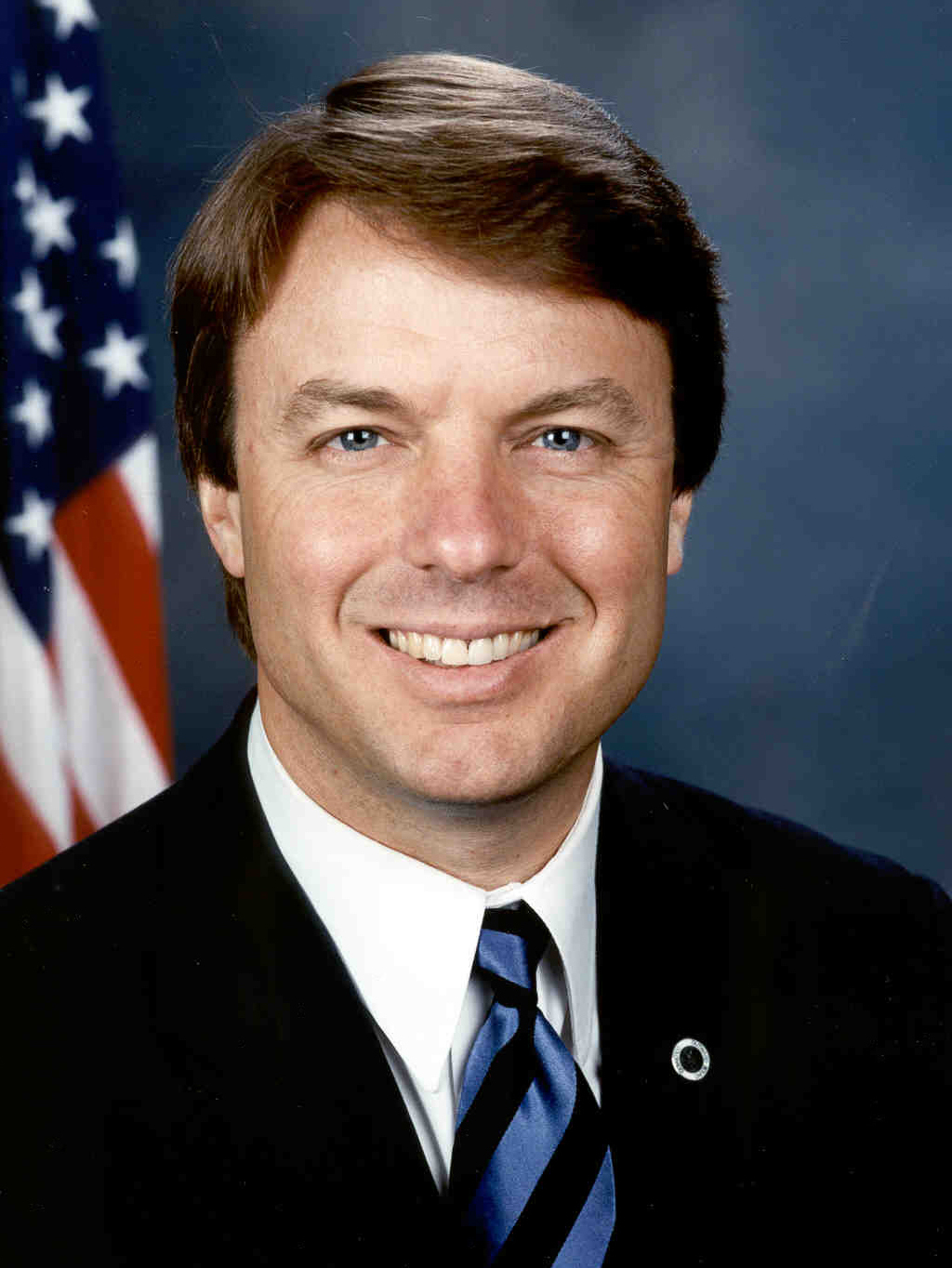
Nominee	George W. Bush	John Kerry	John Edwards
Party	Republican	Democratic	Democratic
Home state	Texas	Massachusetts	North Carolina
Running mate	Dick Cheney	John Edwards	John Edwards
Electoral vote	286	251 (Note: 252 electors pledged to the Kerry/Edwards ticket were elected; however, a faithless elector from Minnesota cast a ballot for Edwards for both president and vice president, bringing the ticket's total number of electoral votes to 251.)	1
States carried	31	19 + DC	0
- Objections made to the electoral college votes of the 2004 U.S. presidential election. No objections Objections defeated
President before election
George W. Bush
Republican
Elected President
George W. Bush
Republican

The count of the Electoral College ballots during a joint session of the 109th United States Congress, pursuant to the Electoral Count Act, on January 6, 2005, was held as the final step to confirm then-incumbent President George W. Bush's victory in the 2004 presidential election over Senator John Kerry (D–MA).

One Democratic representative, Stephanie Tubbs Jones (D–OH-11), filed a congressional objection to the certification of Bush's Ohio electoral votes throughout the session, with one Democratic senator, Barbara Boxer (D–CA), signed onto the objections.

== Background ==
=== Electoral College ===
The United States Electoral College is the group of presidential electors required by the Article Two of the Constitution to form every four years for the sole purpose of electing the president and vice president. Each state appoints electors according to its legislature, equal in number to its congressional delegation (senators and representatives). Federal office holders cannot be electors. Of the current 538 electors, an absolute majority of 270 or more electoral votes is required to elect the president and vice president. As stated in the Twelfth Amendment to the United States Constitution, if no candidate for either office achieves an absolute majority there, a contingent election is held by the United States House of Representatives to elect the president, and by the United States Senate to elect the vice president; under this amendment, only the election of 1824 failed to produce a majority for president, and the election of 1836 for vice president.

Each state and the District of Columbia produces two documents to be forwarded to Congress, a certificate of ascertainment and a certificate of vote. A certificate of ascertainment is an official document that identifies the state's appointed College electors and the tally of the final popular vote count for each candidate in that state in a presidential election; the certificate of ascertainment is submitted after an election by the governor of each state to the archivist of the United States and others, in accordance with 3 U.S.C. §§ 6–14 and the Electoral Count Act. Within the United States' electoral system, the certificates "[represent] a crucial link between the popular vote and votes cast by electors". The certificates must bear the state seal and the governor's signature. Staff from the Office of the Federal Register ensure that each certificate contains all legally required information. When each state's appointed electors meet to vote (on the first Monday after the second Wednesday of December), they sign and record their vote on a certificate of vote, which are then paired with the certificate of ascertainment, which together are sent to be opened and counted by Congress.

The 12th Amendment mandates Congress assemble in joint session to count the electoral votes and declare the winners of the election. The Electoral Count Act, a federal law enacted in 1887, further established specific procedures for the counting of the electoral votes by the joint Congress. The session is ordinarily required to take place on January 6 in the calendar year immediately following the meetings of the presidential electors. Since the 20th Amendment, the newly elected joint Congress declares the winner of the election; all elections before 1936 were determined by the outgoing Congress.

A state's certificate of vote can be rejected only if both Houses of Congress, debating separately, vote to accept an objection by a majority in each House. If the objection is approved by both Houses, the state's votes are not included in the count. Individual votes can also be objected to, and are also not counted. If there are no objections or all objections are overruled, the presiding officer simply includes a state's votes, as declared in the certificate of vote, in the official tally. After the certificates from all states are read and the respective votes are counted, the presiding officer simply announces the final state of the vote. This announcement concludes the joint session and formalizes the recognition of the president-elect and of the vice president-elect. The senators then depart from the House chamber. The final tally is printed in the Senate and House journals.

=== Faithless elector ===
One elector in Minnesota cast a ballot for president with the name of "John Ewards" [sic] written on it. The Electoral College officials certified this ballot as a vote for Edwards for president. The remaining nine electors cast ballots for Kerry. All ten electors in the state cast ballots for Edwards for vice president (Edwards's name was spelled correctly on all ballots for vice president). This was the first time in U.S. history that an elector had cast a vote for the same person to be both president and vice president. Electoral balloting in Minnesota was performed by secret ballot, and none of the electors admitted to casting the Edwards vote for president, so it may never be known who the faithless elector was. It is not even known whether the vote for Edwards was deliberate or unintentional; the Republican Secretary of State and several of the Democratic electors have expressed the opinion that this was an accident.

== Joint Session of Congress ==
=== Objection to certification of Ohio's electoral votes ===
On January 6, 2005, Senator Barbara Boxer joined Representative Stephanie Tubbs Jones of Ohio in filing a congressional objection to the certification of Ohio's Electoral College votes due to alleged irregularities including disqualification of provisional ballots, alleged misallocation of voting machines, and disproportionately long waits in predominantly African-American communities. Ohio's polling locations and equipment are determined by two Democrats and two Republicans serving on the county's Board of Elections, which ensures that any decision made about polling resources is bipartisan. The Senate voted the objection down 74–1; the House voted the objection down 267–31. At the time, it was only the second congressional objection to an entire U.S. state's electoral delegation in American history; the first instance was in 1877, when all the electors from three Southern states in the 1876 United States presidential election were challenged, and one from Oregon. The third instance was in 2021, when Republicans objected to the certification of the electors from Arizona and Pennsylvania. An objection to a single faithless elector was also filed in 1969.

State	Electoral votes	Winner	Faithless electors	Objection				
State	Electoral votes	Winner	Faithless electors	Raised by		Vote		Outcome
State	Electoral votes	Winner	Faithless electors	House	Senate	House	Senate	Outcome
Alabama	9	Bush/Cheney	None	None		—		No Objections
Alaska	3	Bush/Cheney	None	None		—		No Objections
Arizona	10	Bush/Cheney	None	None		—		No Objections
Arkansas	6	Bush/Cheney	None	None		—		No Objections
California	55	Kerry/Edwards	None	None		—		No Objections
Colorado	9	Bush/Cheney	None	None		—		No Objections
Connecticut	7	Kerry/Edwards	None	None		—		No Objections
Delaware	3	Kerry/Edwards	None	None		—		No Objections
District of Columbia	3	Kerry/Edwards	None	None		—		No Objections
Florida	27	Bush/Cheney	None	None		—		No Objections
Georgia	15	Bush/Cheney	None	None		—		No Objections
Hawaii	4	Kerry/Edwards	None	None		—		No Objections
Idaho	4	Bush/Cheney	None	None		—		No Objections
Illinois	21	Kerry/Edwards	None	None		—		No Objections
Indiana	11	Bush/Cheney	None	None		—		No Objections
Iowa	7	Bush/Cheney	None	None		—		No Objections
Kansas	6	Bush/Cheney	None	None		—		No Objections
Kentucky	8	Bush/Cheney	None	None		—		No Objections
Louisiana	9	Bush/Cheney	None	None		—		No Objections
Maine	4	Kerry/Edwards	None	None		—		No Objections
Maryland	10	Kerry/Edwards	None	None		—		No Objections
Massachusetts	12	Kerry/Edwards	None	None		—		No Objections
Michigan	17	Kerry/Edwards	None	None		—		No Objections
Minnesota	9 (Note: One faithless elector from Minnesota cast a ballot for John Edwards (written as "John Ewards") for both president and vice president.)	Kerry/Edwards	1 for John Edwards	None		—		No Objections
Mississippi	6	Bush/Cheney	None	None		—		No Objections
Missouri	11	Bush/Cheney	None	None		—		No Objections
Montana	3	Bush/Cheney	None	None		—		No Objections
Nebraska	5	Bush/Cheney	None	None		—		No Objections
Nevada	5	Bush/Cheney	None	None		—		No Objections
New Hampshire	4	Kerry/Edwards	None	None		—		No Objections
New Jersey	15	Kerry/Edwards	None	None		—		No Objections
New Mexico	5	Bush/Cheney	None	None		—		No Objections
New York	31	Kerry/Edwards	None	None		—		No Objections
North Carolina	15	Bush/Cheney	None	None		—		No Objections
North Dakota	3	Bush/Cheney	None	None		—		No Objections
Ohio	20	Bush/Cheney	None	Stephanie Tubbs Jones (D–OH-11)	Barbara Boxer (D–CA)	31–267	1–74	Objection defeated
Oklahoma	7	Bush/Cheney	None	None		—		No Objections
Oregon	7	Kerry/Edwards	None	None		—		No Objections
Pennsylvania	21	Kerry/Edwards	None	None		—		No Objections
Rhode Island	4	Kerry/Edwards	None	None		—		No Objections
South Carolina	8	Bush/Cheney	None	None		—		No Objections
South Dakota	3	Bush/Cheney	None	None		—		No Objections
Tennessee	11	Bush/Cheney	None	None		—		No Objections
Texas	34	Bush/Cheney	None	None		—		No Objections
Utah	5	Bush/Cheney	None	None		—		No Objections
Vermont	3	Kerry/Edwards	None	None		—		No Objections
Virginia (Note: With Virginia's 13 electoral votes, George W. Bush and Dick Cheney surpassed the 270 electoral vote threshold, securing victory in the electoral vote count.)	13	Bush/Cheney	None	None		—		No Objections
Washington	11	Kerry/Edwards	None	None		—		No Objections
West Virginia	5	Bush/Cheney	None	None		—		No Objections
Wisconsin	10	Kerry/Edwards	None	None		—		No Objections
Wyoming	3	Bush/Cheney	None	None		—		No Objections

=== Ohio ===
Senate vote on the objection (3:18 pm EST on January 6, 2005)
Party	Votes for	Votes against	Not voting
Republican (55)	–	38	17
Democratic (44)	1: Barbara Boxer (D-CA)	35	8: Daniel Akaka (D-HI); Evan Bayh (D-IN); Jeff Bingaman (D-NM); Jon Corzine (D-NJ); Dianne Feinstein (D-CA); John Kerry (D-MA); Mary Landrieu (D-LA); Patty Murray (D-WA)
Independent (1)	–	1: Jim Jeffords (I-VT)	–
Total (100)	1	74	25

House vote on the objection (5:02 pm EST on January 6, 2005)
Party	Votes for	Votes against	Not voting
Republican (230)	–	178	52
Democratic (199)	31: Corrine Brown (D-FL-3); Julia Carson (D-IN-7); Lacy Clay (D-MO-1); Jim Clyburn (D-SC-6); John Conyers (D-MI-14); Danny K. Davis (D-IL-7); Lane Evans (D-IL-17); Sam Farr (D-CA-17); Bob Filner (D-CA-51); Raúl Grijalva (D-AZ-7); Alcee Hastings (D-FL-23); Maurice Hinchey (D-NY-22); Sheila Jackson Lee (D-TX-18); Jesse Jackson Jr. (D-IL-2); Eddie Bernice Johnson (D-TX-30); Stephanie Tubbs Jones (D-OH-11); Carolyn Cheeks Kilpatrick (D-MI-13); Dennis Kucinich (D-OH-10); Barbara Lee (D-CA-9); John Lewis (D-GA-5); Ed Markey (D-MA-7); Cynthia McKinney (D-GA-4); John Olver (D-MA-1); Major Owens (D-NY-11); Frank Pallone (D-NJ-6); Donald M. Payne (D-NJ-10); Jan Schakowsky (D-IL-9); Bennie Thompson (D-MS-2); Maxine Waters (D-CA-35); Diane Watson (D-CA-33); Lynn Woolsey (D-CA-6)	88	80
Independent (1)	–	1: Bernie Sanders (I-VT)	–
Total (430)	31	267	132

Nine representatives who contested Bush's 2004 victory in Ohio had previously contested his 2000 victory in Florida. They are Barbara Lee (D-CA-9), Maxine Waters (D-CA-35), Bob Filner (D-CA-51), Cynthia McKinney (D-GA-4), Corrine Brown (D-FL-3), Alcee Hastings (D-FL-23), Jesse Jackson Jr. (D-IL-2), Sheila Jackson Lee (D-TX-18), and Eddie Bernice Johnson (D-TX-30).

== See also ==
- 2004 United States presidential election
- Second inauguration of George W. Bush
- 2004 United States election voting controversies
