= Lame-duck session =

Congressional session after an election

A lame-duck session of Congress in the United States occurs whenever one Congress meets after its successor is elected, but before the successor's term begins. The expression is now used not only for a special session called after a sine die adjournment, but also for any portion of a regular session that falls after an election. In current practice, any meeting of Congress after election day, but before the next Congress convenes the following January, is a lame-duck session. Prior to 1933, when the 20th Amendment changed the dates of the congressional term, the last regular session of Congress was always a lame-duck session.

Congress has held 16 lame-duck sessions since 1940. Recesses preceding lame-duck sessions have usually begun by mid-October and typically lasted between one and two months. Congress typically reconvened in mid-November and adjourned before Christmas, so that the lame-duck session lasted about a month. Some recesses, however, have begun as early as August 7 or as late as November 3 and ended as early as November 8 or as late as December 31. Lame-duck sessions have ended as early as November 22 and as late as January 3 and have extended over as few as one and as many as 145 calendar days.

Some lame-duck sessions have been held largely for pro forma reasons (e.g., 1948), on a standby basis (e.g., 1940, 1942), or to deal with a single specific matter (e.g., 1954, 1994, 1998). Some sessions, as well, have deferred major matters to the succeeding Congress (e.g., 1944, 1982, 2004), especially when a stronger majority for the same party was in prospect. Most, however, could be regarded as at least moderately productive. When the President has presented an extensive agenda to a lame-duck session controlled by his own party, it has often approved many of his recommendations (e.g., 1950, 2002, 2004), but when he has done so under conditions of divided government, he has had less success and has often vetoed measures (e.g., 1970, 1974, 1982). Additionally, a major task of most lame-duck sessions in recent years has been to complete action on appropriations and the budget. In 1974, 1980, 1982, 2000, 2004, and 2012, this effort was at least somewhat successful, but in 1970 and 2002, a final resolution was largely left to the following Congress.

Lame-duck sessions do not usually occur in countries under a parliamentary form of government, whether the Westminster system or other models. Under a parliamentary system there are usually no fixed dates for elections or the beginning of terms, so that a new session of parliament will always begin with its first meeting after an election has been held. Often the previous parliament is dissolved by the head of state at the request of the head of government, therefore even in an emergency there is no parliament to call after the final session until the new parliament has been elected. In contrast to members of Congress who do wield their full authority until their term ends, the power of outgoing parliamentarians is limited by convention; any cabinet ministers that were members of the now dissolved parliament will serve in an "acting" or "caretaker" capacity (i.e. not being able to make important appointments nor policy declarations) until the new parliament convenes.

== Terminology ==
=== Definition ===
A "lame duck" session of Congress is one that takes place after the election for the next Congress has been held, but before the current Congress has reached the end of its constitutional term. Under contemporary conditions, any meeting of Congress that occurs between a congressional election in November and the following January 3 is a lame duck session. The significant characteristic of a lame duck session is that its participants are the sitting Members of the existing Congress, not those who will be entitled to sit in the new Congress.

A lame-duck session can occur in several ways:

- In practice, Congress has usually provided for its existing session to resume after a recess spanning the election. (In 1954, only the Senate returned in this way, while the House adjourned sine die.)
- In 1940, 1942, and 2002, Congress continued meeting, sometimes in pro forma sessions every third day, until well after the election.
- Congress can reconvene after an election pursuant to contingent authority granted to the leadership in a recess or adjournment resolution (in 1998, the House alone followed this course).

Two other possibilities have not been realized:

- Congress could set a statutory date for a new session to convene after the election, then adjourn its existing session sine die.
- While Congress is in recess or sine die adjournment, the President could call it into extraordinary session at a date after the election.

=== Etymology ===
The expression "lame duck" originally applied in 18th century Britain to bankrupt businessmen, who were considered as "lame" in the sense that the impairment of their powers rendered them vulnerable, like a game bird injured by shot. By the 1830s, the usage had been extended to officeholders whose service already had a known termination date. In current American usage, for instance, a President is considered a "lame duck" not only if he has been defeated for re-election or after his successor has been elected, but also whenever he cannot be or is known not to be a candidate for reelection.

Members of Congress in similar circumstances are also considered lame ducks. The expression may accordingly be applied to Members who are known not to be seeking re-election as well as to those who have been defeated. In particular, however, after an election of Congress, all the Members who did not gain re-election can be described as lame ducks until the term of the new Congress starts. When the previously sitting Congress, which includes these Members, meets in a post-election session, this session is called a lame-duck session as well.

== Constitutional background ==
=== Since the 20th Amendment ===
The possibility of a lame-duck session of Congress in the modern sense began in 1935 when the 20th Amendment to the Constitution took effect. Under this amendment, ratified in 1933, Congress meets in a regular session on January 3 of each year, unless in the previous session it passes a law changing the date. Also, the terms of Members begin and end on January 3 of odd-numbered years. Under these arrangements, any meeting of Congress after election day (in November of even-numbered years) but before the following January 3 is a lame-duck session.

This report examines only the specific lame-duck sessions that have occurred since 1935, not those that occurred routinely before this date, as explained in the following section.

=== Before the 20th Amendment ===
The Constitution originally provided that the regular sessions of Congress begin annually on the first Monday in December. In the process of initiating the government under the Constitution, it was established that the term of Congress would begin and end on March 4 of odd-numbered years. Today, however, congressional elections are generally held in November of even-numbered years.

The result was that after being elected in (an even-numbered) November, a new Congress did not begin its term until the following (odd-numbered) March, and was not required to convene until the following December, 13 months after it was first elected. This first December session of Congress typically continued until sometime in the summer of the following (even-numbered) year. The Congress would then adjourn until the time for the next regular session prescribed by the Constitution, the following (even-numbered) December.

When Congress reconvened at that time, however, the next Congress would already have been elected, in the intervening (even-numbered) November. The term of that newly elected Congress, on the other hand, would not begin until the following March. The Congress that convened in an even-numbered December, accordingly, could not be the newly elected one, but could only be the one already sitting. Under these arrangements, as a result, the last session of every Congress was always a lame duck session. One purpose of the 20th Amendment was to change these arrangements that routinely required every Congress to hold its last session as a lame duck session.

=== Methods of reconvening ===
Under the 20th Amendment, lame-duck sessions can still occur, but only as a result of specific actions undertaken either by the Congress already sitting or by the President. The specific actions through which a sitting Congress might reconvene after an election, but during the last portion of its own term of office, are of several kinds. The following sections describe these possible means of reconvening. Although some have been used rarely and others not at all, each method helps to illuminate the constitutional arrangements that make lame-duck sessions possible and the conditions in which they may operate.

The courses of action through which Congress might reconvene for a lame duck session include:

- pursuant to a previously enacted law prescribing an additional session of Congress
- following a recess within a session, but spanning the election
- under authority granted to the leadership at the time of a contingent adjournment or recess of the session
- by continuing to meet, perhaps in pro forma sessions, throughout the period spanning the election
- in response to a presidential proclamation calling an extraordinary session

==== Sine die adjournment ====
Although the "lame-duck sessions" that have occurred before and after 1935 are both "lame duck" in the same sense, they are not "sessions" in the same sense. Formally, a session of Congress ends when Congress adjourns sine die. The Latin phrase, literally translated as "without day," is used to mean that Congress has adjourned without setting a day for its next meeting. An adjournment sine die, therefore, means that Congress is not scheduled to meet again until the day set by the Constitution (or by law) for its next session to convene. When Congress adjourns sine die in an election year, it is not scheduled to meet again until after the term of the new Congress begins. That meeting will, therefore, begin the first session of the new Congress.

Before 1935, Congress would normally adjourn its previous session sine die before the November elections. When it returned for its prescribed meeting in December, accordingly, a new session began. Under these conditions, the "lame-duck session" of each Congress was actually a session in its own right, numerically distinct from the previous session (or sessions) of the same Congress. Accordingly, each of the lame duck sessions that occurred routinely before 1935 was convened as a separate session of the Congress already sitting.

Congress today could achieve an equivalent result by adjourning its session sine die before an election, after first providing by law for an additional session of the old Congress to convene on a date after the election. This additional, post-election session (probably the third session of the old Congress) would be a lame-duck session in the same sense as those that occurred routinely before 1935. It would be a new, separately numbered session of the old Congress. Subsequent to the implementation of the 20th Amendment in 1935, however, Congress has never made use of this first means of bringing about a lame-duck session.

==== Recess ====
Instead, when a Congress has decided to continue meeting after an election, its usual practice has been not to adjourn sine die but simply to recess its existing session for a period spanning the election, and then to reconvene at a date still within the constitutional term of the sitting Congress. Since 1935, this second means of bringing about a lame-duck session has been used on 11 occasions.

Congress authorizes a session recess in the same way it authorizes a sine die adjournment, by adopting a concurrent resolution. This form of authorization is necessary because the Constitution provides that "Neither House, during the Session of Congress shall, without the Consent of the other, adjourn for more than three days...." A concurrent resolution requires adoption by both houses, and accordingly can be used for each house to consent to the adjournment of the other.

This constitutional requirement applies both to sine die adjournments and to session recesses, which are technically adjournments within a session. Unlike a sine die adjournment, however, a recess does not terminate an existing session of Congress. When Congress reconvenes at the conclusion of a recess, accordingly, no new session begins, but the previously existing session resumes. Under these conditions, the post-election meeting of Congress is not a separate, new session of the old Congress, but a continuation of its existing session (probably its second session). Nevertheless, the phrase "lame-duck session" has persisted as a way of referring to any post-election meeting of the old Congress, even though it now normally does not designate a separate session of Congress but rather refers simply to the post-election portion of an ongoing existing session.

==== Contingent reconvening authority ====
The two sequences of events just discussed (a recess of an existing session and adjourning sine die after providing for a new session) are not the only ones that can lead to a lame-duck session. A third such course of events becomes possible if, when Congress recesses before an election, it grants contingent authority to its leadership to reconvene it, or either house, "if the public interest shall require." In the period since the ratification of the 20th Amendment, the practice has grown up that Congress often includes this contingent authority, in some form, in concurrent resolutions providing for a session recess or a sine die adjournment.

If Congress included this contingent authority in a resolution providing for a recess spanning an election, the leadership might use the authority to reconvene Congress before the scheduled expiration of the recess. It might do so either before or after the election itself, but in either case, any portion of the reconvened session occurring after the election would be considered a lame-duck session. During the time since the 20th Amendment took effect, however, this course of action has not been taken.

If Congress adjourns sine die with contingent reconvening authority, on the other hand, the sine die character of the adjournment becomes final only if the leadership does not exercise this authority by the time the next session of Congress is slated to convene, pursuant to either the Constitution or law. If the authority is exercised, the existing session of the old Congress resumes, and the previous adjournment turns out not to have been sine die. Any post-election portion of this continuation of the previous session of Congress would be considered a lame-duck session. The Speaker of the House used this authority in 1998 to reconvene the chamber in a post-election continuation of a session that had previously been terminated by a conditional sine die adjournment.

==== Intermittent and pro forma sessions ====
A fourth way in which a lame-duck session can occur arises if Congress chooses not to authorize a recess spanning an election. In this case, the lame duck session occurs if Congress simply continues to meet throughout the pre-election period and afterwards. Any portion of the continuing session of Congress that takes place after the election would be considered a lame duck session. As Table 1 and the accompanying discussion shows, Congress has taken this course of action on three occasions since 1935.

On some occasions, under these conditions, each house has chosen to meet only on every third day during the period spanning the election (and sometimes throughout the post-election period as well, until sine die adjournment). In addition, it is not necessary that either house transact any business during these intermittent meetings. If, during a given day's session, no business is transacted, it becomes a pro forma session, meaning one held only "for the sake of formality." In this case, the formality being satisfied is the constitutional requirement that neither house recess for more than three days if the other has not consented to a recess.

==== Presidential call ====
A final means by which a lame-duck session could occur arises from the constitutional authorization for the president to convene Congress, "on extraordinary occasions," by calling a special session. If Congress convenes, pursuant to this call, after a sine die adjournment and before the next session is scheduled to begin, a new session of the existing Congress begins. This course of events has not occurred since 1935. On the other hand, if the president calls Congress back during a recess of an existing session, the existing session resumes. This course of events occurred in 1948 when President Harry Truman called Congress back for an extraordinary session in the middle of a recess for the national political conventions.

The extraordinary session called by President Truman did not constitute a lame-duck session because it both convened and recessed before the election. By the same means, however, a president might call an extraordinary session to convene at a date after the election and before the term of the sitting Congress ends. The president could do so whether Congress had only recessed its previous session or had adjourned it sine die. In either case, the post-election meeting of Congress would be considered a lame-duck session. No lame-duck session since 1935 has occurred through this means.

== Trends ==
=== Frequency ===
Lame-duck sessions were frequent in the years surrounding World War II, occurring in six of eight Congresses (76th through 83rd) between 1940 and 1954. None occurred from 1956 through and 1968. There were two in each of the next three decades. Another gap occurred from 1984 through 1992. Lame-duck sessions have occurred in the last seven Congresses in a row (105th–111th).

On one occasion, in 1954, only the Senate returned, and only to consider the censure of Senator Joseph McCarthy; and once, in 1998, only the House returned, principally to consider the impeachment of President Bill Clinton.

=== Methods used ===
Twelve lame-duck sessions have been preceded by a recess spanning the election, while the remaining three Congresses continued to meet intermittently, often in pro-forma sessions, during the election period. The latter schedule was used for the first two lame-duck sessions after the adoption of the 20th Amendment, which occurred shortly before or during World War II, in 1940 and 1942. It was again used only in 2002.

Congress suspended its session during the election period preceding 12 lame-duck sessions since 1935. On seven of these 12 occasions (1944, 1948, 1974, 1994, 1998, 2000, and 2004), the resolution providing for the break afforded contingent authority to the leadership to call Congress back before the scheduled resumption of the session. For the remaining five lame-duck sessions (1950, 1954, 1970, 1980, and 1982), Congress did not afford the leadership this authority.

Ten of these 12 election breaks represented recesses of the ongoing session of Congress. The remaining two cases were those mentioned above, in which only one house returned after the election. In 1954, the House adjourned sine die, and the Senate recessed (with no contingent reconvening authority), permitting the Senate to deal with the censure of Senator McCarthy in a lame-duck session. In 1998, both houses adjourned sine die with contingent reconvening authority. The House leadership then used the reconvening authority to call the chamber back to address the question of impeachment. This last instance is the only occasion on which a lame-duck session has convened pursuant to contingent authority of the leadership.

=== Timing ===
Since 1970, when Congress has recessed before a lame-duck session, the beginning of the recess has most often occurred in early to mid-October. The latest that Congress has ever continued to meet before recessing for an election was in 2000 (106th Congress), when the Senate left on November 2 and the House on November 3. Prior to 1970, by contrast, each of the four election recesses preceding a lame-duck session began in September or August. The earliest start of an election recess was August 7, 1948 (80th Congress). In this case, Congress had recessed its regular session on June 20, scheduling itself to reconvene on December 31, but President Truman had called Congress back into an extraordinary session on July 26.

Most commonly, lame-duck sessions have convened in the latter half of November. The latest date of reconvening after an election was that of the 80th Congress on December 31, 1948. Except for years when Congress took no election recess, the earliest reconvening of both houses occurred in 1980 when the 97th Congress returned on November 12, but in 1954 (83rd Congress), the Senate alone returned on November 8. Congress also reconvened on relatively early dates in 2000 (106th Congress), when the House returned on November 13 and the Senate on November 14, and in 1944 (78th Congress), when both houses returned on November 14.

Lame-duck sessions have most often adjourned sine die in about mid-December, or at least before Christmas. The 76th Congress, however, did not close until January 3, 1941, when the 77th Congress was to convene. This termination represents the latest sine die adjournment among the 15 lame-duck sessions. Other late terminations occurred in the 81st and 91st Congresses, both of which adjourned sine die on January 2 (1951 and 1971, respectively). The earliest end of a lame-duck session occurred in 2002 (107th Congress), when the House adjourned sine die on November 22, the Senate having done so two days earlier.

=== Length ===
Lame-duck sessions since 1935 have typically lasted about a month. The average length from commencement to closing has been 28 calendar days; the median, 33 (that is, half the lame-duck sessions were longer than 33 days and half shorter). Eight of the 15 lame-duck sessions have lasted between 25 and 37 calendar days; only three have exceeded this range. The longest was the first (76th Congress), which lasted 58 days, meeting (usually every third day) between November 7, 1940 (the day after election day), and January 3, 1941. The 77th Congress (1942) followed a similar pattern, but adjourned sine die after 48 calendar days. The lame-duck session of the 91st Congress reached 45 calendar days by remaining in session until January 2, 1971. The shortest lame-duck session occurred in the 80th Congress when both houses returned solely to close the session on December 31, 1948. Other unusually short lame-duck sessions included those of 1994 (103rd Congress) and 1998 (105th Congress, House only), each of which lasted only three calendar days.

The length of the recess preceding a lame-duck session has also varied. On the 12 occasions since 1935 when Congress recessed for the election, the recess typically lasted between one month and two. Nine of the 12 election recesses fell between 30 and 64 days in length, with the mean length of all 12 recesses being 54 days and the median 51. The only election recess shorter than 30 days occurred in 2000 when the 106th Congress recessed for only nine days around the election. The longest election recess occurred in 1948 (80th Congress), with 145 days elapsing between the end of the special session called by President Truman and the largely pro forma reconvening and adjournment on December 31. The only other election recess longer than 64 days occurred in 1954 (83rd Congress) and lasted 79 days.

== Sessions since 1935 ==
Primary sources, including the Congressional Record and Congressional Directory, and secondary sources such as the Congressional Quarterly Weekly Report, CQ Almanac, and, for the earlier years, The New York Times, formed the foundation for these descriptions. Internet-based sources were also utilized.

=== 1940s–1950s ===
==== 76th Congress, 3rd session (1940–1941) ====
After the first session of the 76th Congress adjourned in August 1939, President Franklin D. Roosevelt called Congress into an extraordinary session in September to address the threat of war in Europe, and this session lasted into November. Thus, the annual session that began on January 3, 1940, was the third session of the 76th Congress. It, too, was dominated by the international situation. The President requested the largest peacetime defense program to that point in American history, and by the end of the summer, Congress had enacted $13 billion in defense authorizations and appropriations, a military draft, income tax revisions, an excess profits tax, and related measures.

In June, July, and again in September 1940, the President expressed the view that Congress need not remain in session any longer. Some congressional leaders, however, believed that Congress should "stand by" in session in case of an emergency. Congress met regularly through mid-October, then limited itself to two or three meetings per week until January 3, 1941; there was no extended recess for the November 1940 elections. The session thus became the longest in history up to that point.

During the lame-duck period following the election, little was undertaken; the Congressional Record from November 4, 1940, through January 3, 1941, covers fewer than 500 pages, and quorums were often hard to raise. The administration declined to send major new proposals (such as a defense production board, aid to Britain, new taxes, and an increase in the debt limit) to Capitol Hill until the 77th Congress would convene in January. Work was also impeded because both the House and Senate had to meet in substitute quarters while their chambers in the Capitol underwent repairs. Among the more notable actions of this lame-duck period were the decision to sustain the veto of a measure to limit regulatory agency powers and the publication of a committee report on sabotage of the defense effort.

==== 77th Congress, 2nd session (1942) ====
In the wartime year of 1942, Congress again remained in session continuously through the election, adjourning sine die on December 16. Congress generally followed a regular schedule of daily meetings throughout the period, except near the election, when it met every third day.

Activities in the lame duck portion of the 77th Congress were affected by the knowledge that the 78th Congress, to begin in January, would contain a much narrowed Democratic majority. Congress declined to take final action to approve the Third War Powers Bill or a bill to expand the Reconstruction Finance Corporation, including an agricultural parity rider attached to the latter. Other questions left to the next Congress included comprehensive national service legislation, placing a ceiling on net personal income through the tax code, curbing the powers of regulatory agencies, and planning for censorship of communications with U.S. territories. A bill to abolish poll taxes passed the House, but fell to a filibuster in the Senate.

Congress did pass legislation to adjust overtime pay for government workers, and to provide for the military draft of 18- and 19-year-old men (although Congress deferred deciding whether to require a full year's training before sending them into combat).

By mid-December, quorums became difficult to obtain and leaders of both parties agreed that nothing further could be brought up before the start of the 78th Congress in January 1943.

==== 78th Congress, 2nd session (1944) ====
Two years later, with World War II still in progress, Congress recessed for the national party conventions and recessed again for the elections. The latter recess began on September 21, 1944. Congress returned on November 14 and remained in session until December 19. Accordingly, 1944 marks the first instance after ratification of the 20th Amendment of a separate and distinct meeting of Congress during its lame duck period.

Among the issues facing the post-election session were questions of peacetime universal military training; extension of the War Powers Act and the reciprocal trade system; a scheduled increase in Social Security taxes; and a rivers and harbors appropriations bill. Congress also debated congressional reform issues, including restructuring the committee system and increasing congressional pay. Postwar reconstruction and a renewal of domestic programs were also mentioned as possible subjects for action.

Ultimately, Congress deferred several issues until the start of the 79th Congress, including universal military training, the Bretton Woods monetary agreements, the Reciprocal Trade Act, and changes to the Social Security system. Several other measures could not be completed, including a rivers and harbors bill, a Senate-passed bill making major changes in congressional procedures; and a pay increase for postal workers. A bill delaying the Social Security tax increase was enacted, however, as were a renewal of the War Powers Act and a bill increasing the congressional clerk-hire allowance. In addition, the Senate confirmed the nomination of Edward R. Stettinius as Secretary of State.

==== 80th Congress, 2nd session (1948) ====
Congress recessed in August 1948, before the national party conventions, with the intention of returning only on December 31 to bring the 80th Congress to a formal conclusion, unless earlier called back by congressional leaders. During the convention recess, however, President Harry S Truman called Congress back in extraordinary session to deal with a series of legislative priorities he considered urgent. This occurrence represents the only time since the adoption of the 20th Amendment that the President has convened Congress in an extraordinary session.

Congress met pursuant to this call from July 27 to August 7, but then recessed again under the same terms as before. The leadership did not exercise its option to reconvene Congress during this new recess, and Congress met again only on December 31. This session, the shortest lame duck session under the 20th Amendment, met for just under an hour and a half, then adjourned sine die.

During the brief session, both chambers approved a measure extending for 60 days the life of the Commission on Organization of the Executive Branch of Government (Hoover Commission). The Senate also extended for 30 days the life of the Special Small Business Committee, and both houses swore in new Members elected or appointed to full unexpired terms.

==== 81st Congress, 2nd session (1950–1951) ====
With the Korean War at a critical juncture in the fall of 1950, congressional leaders announced in late September that after the election Congress would reconvene in late November. Until November, Congress would be available to meet should the President call an emergency session. Congress recessed on September 23 and convened for the lame duck session on November 27.

As the lame duck session met, Chinese troops crossed into Korea, and General Douglas A. MacArthur warned Congress that the United Nations faced "an entirely new" war in the region. The Korean War and the possible use of atomic weapons dominated congressional attention through the session. Nevertheless, President Truman presented congressional leaders with a list of 13 proposals, including five he described as of "greatest urgency." The five included several measures favored by congressional leaders: aid to Yugoslavia and supplemental appropriations for defense and atomic energy. The President also asked Congress to act on an excess profits tax, an extension of federal rent controls, and statehood for Hawaii and Alaska.

Congress stayed in session through the New Year. It approved the rent control extension and a $38 million famine relief bill for Yugoslavia. In the week before the Christmas holidays, it completed work on an $18 billion defense supplemental appropriations bill, the excess profits tax, and a civil defense program.

Efforts to obtain a vote on statehood for Alaska were abandoned after a week of intermittent Senate debate on a motion to take up the measure. The 81st Congress adjourned sine die on January 2, 1951, and the 82nd Congress convened the next day.

==== 83rd Congress, 2nd session (1954) ====
Prior to the 1954 congressional election, the House adjourned sine die on August 20, but the Senate recessed on that date and then reconvened on November 8. The Senate met for the sole purpose of considering the recommendation of a select committee to censure Senator Joseph R. McCarthy for improprieties committed in the course of his investigations into allegations of communist influence in the federal government. Made over a period of more than five years, Senator McCarthy's allegations had eventually led to investigations of McCarthy himself, and the Senate had assigned the issue to a select committee chaired by Senator Arthur V. Watkins (R-UT). This lame duck session was the first time since passage of the 20th Amendment that only one chamber returned to session after an election.

The Senate select committee submitted its censure resolution on November 9, 1954. The first count of the two-count resolution was approved on December 1, and final action was completed the following day. Press reports speculated that the Senate might consider matters other than the McCarthy censure resolution, including a number of pending treaties and nominations, but the Senate took action only on the McCarthy censure resolution and adjourned finally on December 2.

=== 1970s–1980s ===
==== 91st Congress, 2nd session (1970–1971) ====
Congressional leaders called a post-election session in 1970 for the first time in almost 20 years to complete action on a list of pending legislation, including electoral reform, the Family Assistance Plan (the Nixon Administration's principal welfare reform proposal), occupational safety and health, equal rights for women, manpower training, and funds for the supersonic transport plane (SST). Seven regular appropriations bills also remained to be enacted. Congress convened the lame duck session on November 16, 1970.

Congress stayed in session until January 2, 1971, less than 24 hours before the constitutional deadline of noon on January 3, when the 92nd Congress convened. It kept largely to the agenda the congressional leadership had set before the recess in October, but failed to approve many administration proposals, including the Family Assistance Plan. That bill, with other controversial measures, had been attached to a Social Security bill in the Senate. The SST received only interim funding. President Richard M. Nixon strongly criticized what he termed "major failures" of the lame duck session.

Congress did complete work on two of the seven regular appropriations bills and a measure dealing with foreign aid and foreign military sales. It also passed the Clean Air Act Amendments of 1970, which established deadlines for the reduction of certain pollutants from new automobiles, and a major housing bill, which included a new program of federal crime insurance and created the Community Development Corporation.

President Nixon vetoed four measures during the lame duck session, including a $9.5 billion federal manpower training and public service employment bill. Congress did not override any of these vetoes.

==== 93rd Congress, 2nd session (1974) ====
Delayed in the consideration of major legislation by the extraordinary events of 1973 and 1974—the Watergate investigations, the resignation of Vice President Spiro T. Agnew, the nomination and confirmation of Gerald R. Ford to be vice president, and the resignation of President Nixon and succession of President Ford—Congress reconvened on November 18, 1974, in an effort to clear a long list of important items.

Although congressional leaders had indicated that only the most critical bills would be considered, including approval of the nomination of Nelson A. Rockefeller to be vice president, President Ford greeted the returning Congress with a 10-page list of legislation he wanted passed before the session expired. In the end, Congress did consider a wide range of issues before it adjourned on December 20, 1974, but its actions were not always to President Ford's liking.

The Rockefeller nomination was approved by mid-December, but Congress overrode presidential vetoes of both a vocational rehabilitation bill and a measure amending the Freedom of Information Act. Congress also approved, and the President signed, a bill that nullified a prior agreement giving former President Nixon control over the tapes and papers of his administration.

In other actions, Congress approved a long-delayed trade reform bill giving the President broad authority to negotiate trade agreements, act on trade barriers, and provide import relief to workers, industries, and communities; established a federal policy for research on development of non-nuclear sources of energy; and cleared legislation making continuing appropriations for federal agencies whose regular appropriations had not been enacted.

==== 96th Congress, 2nd session (1980) ====
In 1980, some observers contended that postponing final congressional action on a lengthy agenda of major issues until a post-election session would accomplish two goals: first, it would delay potentially difficult pre-election votes on budget matters, and second, it would allow incumbents extra time to campaign. The large Republican gains on election day were thought to complicate the prospects for a productive lame duck program, however, especially with such important issues as budget reconciliation, several major appropriations bills, and landmark environmental legislation still left for consideration.

In fact, during the lame duck session, from November 12 to December 16, 1980, Congress completed action on many of the issues that had been left unfinished in the regular session, including the following: a budget resolution and a budget reconciliation measure; five regular appropriations bills, although one was subsequently vetoed; a second continuing resolution was approved to continue funding for other parts of the government; an Alaska lands bill and a "superfund" bill to help clean up chemical contamination; a measure extending general revenue sharing for three years; a measure that made disposal of low-level nuclear waste a state responsibility; and changes to military pay and benefits, and authority for the President to call 100,000 military reservists to active duty without declaring a national emergency.

==== 97th Congress, 2nd session (1982) ====
In 1982, with urging from President Ronald W. Reagan, congressional leaders called for the second session of the 97th Congress to reconvene after the congressional election. The Senate met from November 30 to December 23, 1982, and the House from November 30 to December 21. Congress recessed for the election on October 1.

In calling for Congress to return, President Reagan expressed concern that only three of 13 appropriations bills had been cleared for his signature at the time Congress recessed. Dominated by economic concerns—particularly those related to budget and deficit issues—the second session of the 97th Congress was notable for the political tension between the Republican president and Senate, on the one hand, and the Democratic House, on the other.

Congressional leaders indicated they would finish nine of 10 outstanding money bills. But by the end of December, Congress had completed only four, and needed to enact a large continuing resolution to fund remaining government operations for FY1983. Concerned about recession and rising unemployment, House Democrats added a $5.4 billion jobs program to the continuing resolution, but agreed to remove it when the President threatened a veto.

The lame duck session was acrimonious in both chambers, but especially in the Senate, where frequent filibusters caused some all night sessions. The Senate voted on eight cloture motions in December. The most contentious filibuster came late in the month over a measure to increase the gasoline tax. The measure was approved just two days before Christmas.

In addition to completing work on some appropriations bills and the continuing resolution, the House approved a controversial 15% pay raise for itself. An immigration reform bill, favored by the White House and the congressional leadership, stalled when opponents filed hundreds of amendments designed to slow chamber action. The leadership was eventually forced to pull the bill from the floor.

In other decisions, Congress refused to fund production and procurement of the first five MX intercontinental missiles, the first time in recent history that either house of Congress had denied a President's request to fund production of a strategic weapon. Congress also passed a long-sought nuclear waste disposal bill.

=== 1990s–2000s ===
==== 103rd Congress, 2nd session (1994) ====
In 1994, Congress recessed on October 8 and then reconvened on November 28 for the sole purpose of passing a bill implementing a new General Agreement on Tariffs and Trade (GATT). Although the bill received strong support in both chambers during the regular session, opponents in the Senate had kept the measure from reaching a vote on the floor. In the short lame duck session, the House passed the bill on November 29 and the Senate on December 1. Both chambers then adjourned sine die.

==== 105th Congress, 2nd session (1998) ====
In 1998, both the House and Senate adjourned sine die on October 21, 1998. The adjournment resolution gave contingent authority not only to the bicameral leadership to reconvene Congress, but also to the Speaker to reconvene the House. This last authority was granted in anticipation of action to impeach President William J. Clinton. The House convened on December 17, 1998, to consider a resolution of impeachment (H.Res. 611). On December 19, the House adopted Articles I and III of the resolution by votes of 228–206 and 221–212. It then, by a vote of 228–190, adopted a resolution appointing and authorizing House managers for the Senate impeachment trial. The House then adjourned sine die.

On December 17, 1998, the House agreed, as well, to a resolution expressing support for the men and women engaged in a military action in the Persian Gulf.

==== 106th Congress, 2nd session (2000) ====
Because final action on several appropriations bills had not been completed, Congress remained in session into the first days of November, the closest to an election that it had worked since 1942. On November 3, Congress adopted S.Con.Res. 160, authorizing recesses of the House until November 13 and the Senate until November 14. When the two houses returned, with the presidential election undecided, they approved a short-term continuing resolution and the District of Columbia Appropriations Act, and then agreed to a further recess until December 5.

After reconvening on December 5, Congress agreed to a series of five short-term continuing resolutions while final decisions on the remaining appropriations were being negotiated. During this sequence of events, the Senate recessed on December 11 after providing, by unanimous consent, that when the fourth in this series of continuing resolutions was received from the House, it would automatically be deemed passed in the Senate. Finally, on December 15, both chambers completed action on FY2001 appropriations measures by agreeing to the conference report on the omnibus appropriations bill. Congress then adjourned sine die pursuant to H.Con.Res. 446.

During the lame duck session, Congress also cleared the Presidential Threat Protection Act, the Striped Bass Conservation Act, and the Intelligence Authorization Act. It also sent President Clinton a bankruptcy reform measure, which the President subsequently pocket vetoed.

==== 107th Congress, 2nd session (2002) ====
Congress met in intermittent or pro forma sessions during the pre-election period in 2002, but returned to a full schedule of business on November 12 with two priorities: finish work on 11 appropriations bills and consider creation of a Department of Homeland Security (DHS), a measure at the top of President George W. Bush's legislative agenda. A bill to create the DHS had passed the House in late July, 2002, but the Senate did not act until after the election. The Senate passed a similar version of the measure on November 19, and the House agreed to the Senate amendment on November 22. President Bush signed the bill into law on November 25.

Congress, however, was unable to resolve its appropriations differences. The House passed the fifth in a series of continuing resolutions on November 13, and the Senate agreed to the measure on November 19. This measure funded the government at FY2002 levels through January 11, 2003. The Defense Appropriations bill and Military Construction Appropriations bill were the only appropriations measures completed by Congress in 2002.

In addition to the DHS, Congress completed action on, and the President signed into law, several other significant measures, including the Defense Authorization Act, the Intelligence Authorization Act, and measures regulating terrorism insurance and seaport security. The Senate adjourned sine die on November 20 and the House on November 22, 2002.

==== 108th Congress, 2nd session (2004) ====
A lame duck session was considered necessary in 2004 because many appropriation bills had not yet even received Senate action and Congress had not cleared an increase in the debt limit. Conferees also had reached no agreement over legislation to consolidate intelligence activities under a new national director, as recommended by the September 11 commission.

The post-election environment was viewed as favorable to action on an omnibus appropriations measure, by facilitating adherence to caps on domestic discretionary spending, on which the administration insisted, as well as the elimination of many authorizing provisions. Congress initially cleared the measure on November 20, but, because it subsequently had to direct corrections in the enrollment of the bill, President Bush was able to sign it only on December 8, the day of the sine die adjournment. Similarly, although Congress could reach no final agreement on a congressional budget resolution, which would have advanced action to increase the debt limit, post-election conditions enabled the increase to be enacted as a freestanding measure.

During the lame duck period, the administration intensified efforts to persuade House conferees on the intelligence bill to accept modifications in provisions to maintain military control over its own intelligence, keep intelligence funding confidential, and control immigration. The conference report cleared Congress on December 8 and was signed into law on December 17.

Post-election conditions also permitted the resolution of conference deadlocks over several other reauthorizations, including the Individuals with Disabilities Education Act, a moratorium on internet taxation, and authority for satellite television systems to carry network programming. The last of these was enacted as one of the few legislative riders to be included in the omnibus appropriation bill. Failure to resolve policy disagreements, however, doomed several other reauthorizations, including the 1996 welfare reform and a highway bill, although the latter had also been delayed by demands in the Senate for assurances about the role to be played by minority conferees. Finally, a ban on assault weapons expired when the House declined to act on a measure renewing it.

==== 109th Congress, 2nd session (2006) ====
The 109th Congress reconvened on November 13, 2006, largely because it had only cleared two FY2007 appropriations bills prior to the election, funding the Department of Defense and the Department of Homeland Security. A continuing resolution funding the rest of the government was set to expire on November 17. Another top priority for the session was addressing a number of expiring tax benefits. Democrats had gained control of both houses in the November election, and the President and Democratic party leaders expressed hopes of cooperation and bipartisanship leading into the lame duck session.

Despite this optimism and several instances of cooperation, the Congress ultimately did not achieve its primary goal of passing further appropriations measures. Congress opted to fund the government through two successive extensions of the continuing resolution, with H.J.Res. 100 continuing funding through December 8 and H.J.Res. 102 continuing funding through February 15, 2007. Congress also cleared a package of tax benefit extensions, including those for research and development and for education, which was paired with a trade package that included benefits for undeveloped countries and agreements with Vietnam.

Other notable legislation included a bill that allowed President George W. Bush to negotiate an agreement with India permitting cooperation on its development of nuclear power for the first time in thirty years. In addition, Congress passed a bill to overhaul the United States Postal Service and a Veterans’ Affairs package authorizing funds for major medical projects and information technology upgrades. Finally, the Senate confirmed Robert M. Gates as Secretary of Defense to replace Donald Rumsfeld, who stepped down the day following the elections.

==== 110th Congress, 2nd session (2008–2009) ====
The 110th Congress reconvened on November 6, 2008, just two days after the election that gave Democrats wider majorities in both the House and Senate, and ushered in a new Democratic President. The November 6 session, however, along with 14 other sessions from then through January 2, 2009, continued a series of pro forma sessions of the Senate that began in October and were intended to foreclose opportunities for outgoing President George W. Bush to make recess appointments to Federal offices.

The Senate met for substantive business on only seven days during the post-election period. The House, which had adjourned sine die, reconvened on November 19, pursuant to authority granted to its leadership in the adjournment resolution, but met on only five days during the post-election period.

The main legislative business of the lame duck session involved further responses to spreading disruptions of the financial system that had become evident during the campaign period. Before the election, Congress had enacted P.L. 110-343, establishing a $700 billion package of aid to the financial services industry. In the lame duck session, Congress considered legislation to assist America's three largest auto-making companies which were in danger of bankruptcy.

On December 10, the House passed H.R. 7321, which provided $14 billion in loans to automakers by using funds from an existing program. However, opposition in the Senate effectively prevented a vote on the measure. The President subsequently provided $13.4 billion in loans to the automakers out of funds from the financial industry aid package.

Among the few other major measures that came up for a vote was a pension bill that postponed employee pension funding rules for companies and granted a moratorium on the annual distributions for retirement accounts as part of an effort to stave off lay-offs and assist retirees.

=== 2010s–2020s ===
==== 111th–112th Congresses (2010–2012) ====
During lame duck session of the 111th Congress, the Don't Ask, Don't Tell Repeal Act of 2010 and the Tax Relief, Unemployment Insurance Reauthorization, and Job Creation Act of 2010 were both signed into law. The former ended the military's don't ask, don't tell policy, while the latter bill extended the Bush tax cuts for two years and extended unemployment benefits and a FICA payroll tax cut for one year. Democrats also tried to pass the DREAM Act, but the bill failed to pass the 60-vote hurdle needed to invoke cloture.

During the lame duck session of the 112th Congress, the American Taxpayer Relief Act of 2012 was signed into law. The act made permanent the majority of the Bush tax cuts.

==== 113th–115th Congresses (2014–2018) ====
These Congresses also met during the lame duck session.

==== 116th Congress, 2nd session (2020–2021) ====
As of November 18, 2020, the Senate has held 15 roll call votes since the 2020 election, confirming six district court nominees and one nominee to the Court of International Trade. Since 1897, the Senate during lame-duck sessions has not confirmed the judicial nominees of the defeated party's outgoing president with the exception of Stephen Breyer to the First Circuit in 1980. One of the judges confirmed was 33-year-old Kathryn Kimball Mizelle, the youngest judge nominated by President Trump and rated "Not Qualified" by the American Bar Association due to the "short time she has actually practiced law and her lack of meaningful trial experience."

In addition to the judicial nominees, the Senate rejected a cloture motion on Judy Shelton's nomination to the Federal Reserve Board of Governors following the opposition of Republicans Lamar Alexander, Susan Collins and Mitt Romney; Alexander was unable to vote and two Republicans who would have voted for her (Chuck Grassley and Rick Scott) were quarantining after exposure to the novel coronavirus.

In December 2020, President Trump vetoed the Defense Appropriation act and threatened to pocket-veto the COVID-relief/omnibus act. The lame-duck Congress overrode the first and voted to agree to some of his objections to the second.

==== 117th Congress, 2nd session (2022) ====
In addition to various nominations, Congress passed the Respect for Marriage Act (RFMA), the National Defense Authorization Act (NDAA) for Fiscal Year 2023, and the omnibus Consolidated Appropriations Act, 2023 during the lame duck session.

RFMA partially codified the Supreme Court's ruling in Obergefell v. Hodges that legalized same-sex marriage nationwide. The omnibus, besides its primary purpose of funding the U.S. government, also included the Electoral Count Reform And Presidential Transition Improvement Act of 2022 to safeguard elections from subversion and $44.9 billion in aid to Ukraine.
