= Certificate of ascertainment =

Official document identifying appointed electors in US presidential elections

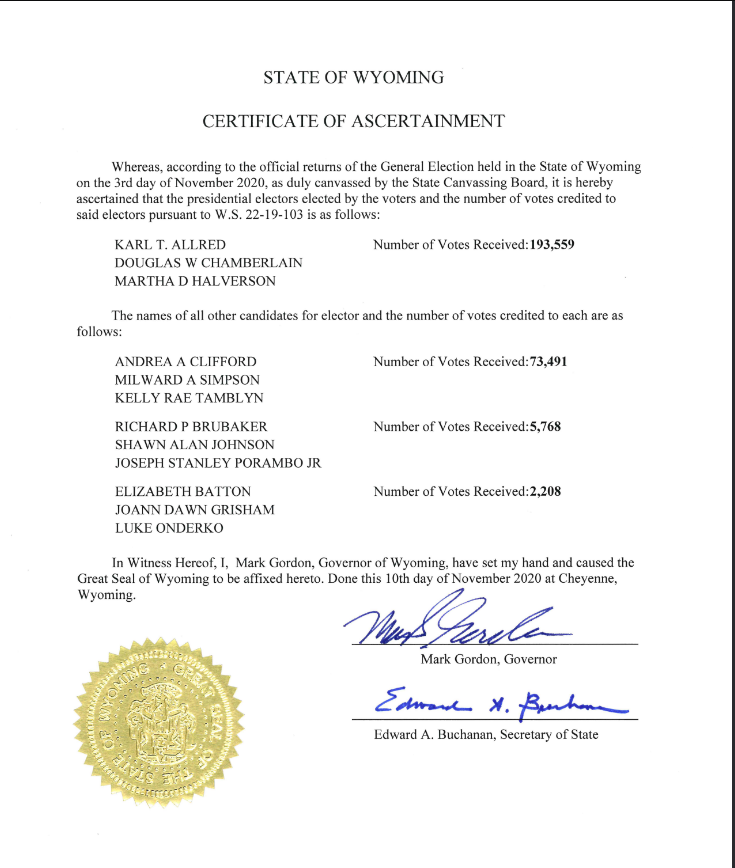
Wyoming's certificate of ascertainment for the 2020 United States presidential election. Note that neither political parties nor their tickets are mentioned.

In the United States, a certificate of ascertainment is an official document that identifies a state's appointed electors for U.S. President and Vice President, and the final vote count for each candidate that received popular votes.

== Procedure ==
After a presidential election, the ascertainment is submitted by the governor of each state (and by the mayor of the District of Columbia) to the Archivist of the United States and others, in accordance with 3 U.S.C. §§ 6–14 the Electoral Count Act, and the Electoral Count Reform and Presidential Transition Improvement Act of 2022. Within the United States' electoral system, the certificates "[represent] a crucial link between the popular vote and votes cast by electors".

The certificates must bear the state seal and the governor's signature. Each state is free to choose the appearance and layout of the certificate. Staff from the Office of the Federal Register ensure that each certificate contains all legally required information. States are required to produce either seven original certificates with two certified copies, or nine original certificates; of these, one original and either two more originals or two copies, are sent to the Archivist via registered mail or a commercial carrier. Both the House and the Senate receive one of the copies.

When each state's electors meet to vote (on the third Monday of December), they sign and record their vote on six "certificates of the vote", which are then paired with the six remaining certificates of ascertainment. One pair of certificates is sent to the president of the Senate; two pairs are sent to the Archivist; two pairs are sent via registered mail to the state's secretary of state; and one pair is sent to the chief judge of the closest United States district court. One of each of the two pairs sent to the Archivist and the secretary of state is designated for public inspection, while the others (and the chief judge's copy) are "held subject to the order of the President of the United States Senate". The Archivist must receive the certificates by the fourth Wednesday in December, and may take "extraordinary measures to retrieve duplicate originals" otherwise.

The Vice President, as President of the Senate, opens the certificates in alphabetical order by state during a joint session of Congress in the House chamber on January 6 (except 2021 when it is rescheduled to the following day due to the Capitol attack) and gives them to one of four "tellers" (two from the House and two from the Senate), who tally the vote while seated at the clerks' desks.

== See also ==
- Electoral Count Reform Act of 2022
