= Electoral Count Act =

United States law on the counting of electoral votes

Electoral Count Act of 1887
- Long title: An act to fix the day for the meeting of the electors of President and Vice-President, and to provide for and regulate the counting of the votes for President and Vice-President, and the decision of questions arising thereon.
- Enacted by: the 49th United States Congress
- Effective: February 3, 1887; 139 years ago

Citations
- Public law: Pub. L. 49–90
- Statutes at Large: 24 Stat. 373 through 24 Stat. 375 (3 pages)

Legislative history
- Signed into law by President Grover Cleveland on February 3, 1887

Major amendments
- Electoral Count Reform and Presidential Transition Improvement Act of 2022

United States Supreme Court cases
- Bush v. Gore

The Electoral Count Act of 1887 (ECA) (Pub. L. 49–90, 24 Stat. 373, later codified at Title 3, Chapter 1) is a United States federal law that added to procedures set out in the Constitution of the United States for the counting of electoral votes following a presidential election. In its unamended form, it last governed at the time of the 2021 United States Electoral College vote count. The Act has since been substantially amended by the Electoral Count Reform and Presidential Transition Improvement Act of 2022.

The Act was enacted by Congress in 1887, ten years after the disputed 1876 presidential election, in which several states submitted competing slates of electors and a divided Congress was unable to resolve the deadlock for weeks. Close elections in 1880 and 1884 followed, and again raised the possibility that with no formally established counting procedure in place, partisans in Congress might use the counting process to force a desired result.

The Act aimed to minimize congressional involvement in election disputes, instead placing the primary responsibility to resolve disputes upon the states. The Act set out procedures and deadlines for the states to follow in resolving disputes, certifying results, and sending the results to Congress. If a state followed these "safe harbor" standards and the state's governor properly submitted one set of electoral votes, the Act stated that this "final" determination "shall govern." However, making or use of "any false writing or document" in the implementation of this procedure was a felony punishable by 5 years imprisonment by 18 U.S. Code 1001 under Chapter 47 Fraud and False Statements. The Act relegated Congress to rejecting electoral votes in only a narrow class of disputes: when a state presented more than one set of electors, when "the electors' votes were not 'regularly given'", or when "the governor had not 'lawfully certified' the electors' appointment". Congress could reject votes under the Act for specific defects: "if a state submits multiple sets of electoral votes", if there were "electors who were constitutionally ineligible to hold the elector's office, who balloted corruptly, or who balloted in a way that violated post-appointment constitutional or statutory requirements", if "the electors' gubernatorial certification resulted from ministerial error", or if "the electors' election was itself so irregular as to be fraudulent or violate constitutional norms".

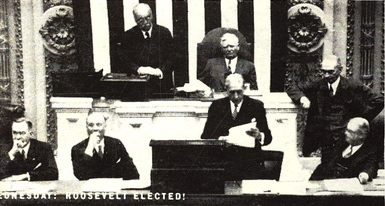
The counting of ballots under the act made the cover of the first issue of Newsweek in 1933

The central provisions of the law were never seriously tested in a disputed election. Since the bill was enacted, some have doubted whether the Act could bind a future Congress. Since the Constitution gives Congress the power to set its own procedural rules, it is possible that simple majorities of the House and Senate could set new rules for the joint session convened to count electoral votes. In the contentious 2000 U.S. presidential election, the law's timing provisions did play a role in court decisions, such as Bush v. Gore. The law has been criticized since it was enacted, with an early commenter describing it as "very confused, almost unintelligible." Modern commenters have stated that the law "invites misinterpretation", observing that it is "turgid and repetitious", and that "[i]ts central provisions seem contradictory."

Under the Twelfth Amendment, the vice president (as President of the Senate) opens the electoral certificates. The act clarified the vice president's limited role in the count. Both houses could overrule the vice president's decision to include or exclude votes, and under the Act even if the chambers disagree, the governor's certification, not the vice president, broke the tie. On many occasions, the vice president has had the duty of finalizing his/her party's defeat, and his/her own on some of those occasions. Charles Curtis, Richard Nixon, Hubert Humphrey, Walter Mondale, Dan Quayle, Al Gore, Mike Pence, and Kamala Harris all notably presided over counts that handed them a loss.

The Electoral Count Reform and Presidential Transition Improvement Act of 2022 made changes to the procedures laid out in the Electoral Count Act, along with adding clarifications on the role of the vice president. The proposal was included in the Consolidated Appropriations Act, 2023, which passed during the final days of the 117th United States Congress. The bill was signed into law by President Joe Biden on December 29, 2022. Simple majorities of a new House and Senate could also set new rules for a subsequent joint session convened to count electoral votes unless constitutional provisions were to be enacted.

== Background ==
=== Electoral College ===
The president and vice president of the United States are formally elected by the Electoral College. The Constitution gives each state the power to appoint its electors "in such Manner as the Legislature thereof may direct". All states have been using some form of popular election since 1868. The electors are "appointed" at the national election held on Election Day, which occurs "on the Tuesday next after the first Monday in November". After Election Day, the electors chosen in each state must then "meet and give their votes on the first Monday after the second Wednesday in December", with meetings of electors typically held in each state capital.

The Twelfth Amendment, ratified in 1804, requires the electors to "make distinct lists of all persons voted for as President, and of all persons voted for as Vice-President, and of the number of votes for each, which lists they shall sign and certify, and transmit sealed to the seat of the government of the United States, directed to the President of the Senate". It also specifies, as did the clause in Article II, that "the President of the Senate shall, in the presence of the Senate and House of Representatives, open all the certificates and the votes shall then be counted."

In discussions of the law, the term "state" includes the District of Columbia, and the term "governor" includes the mayor of the District of Columbia. The District of Columbia appoints electors pursuant to the Twenty-third Amendment.

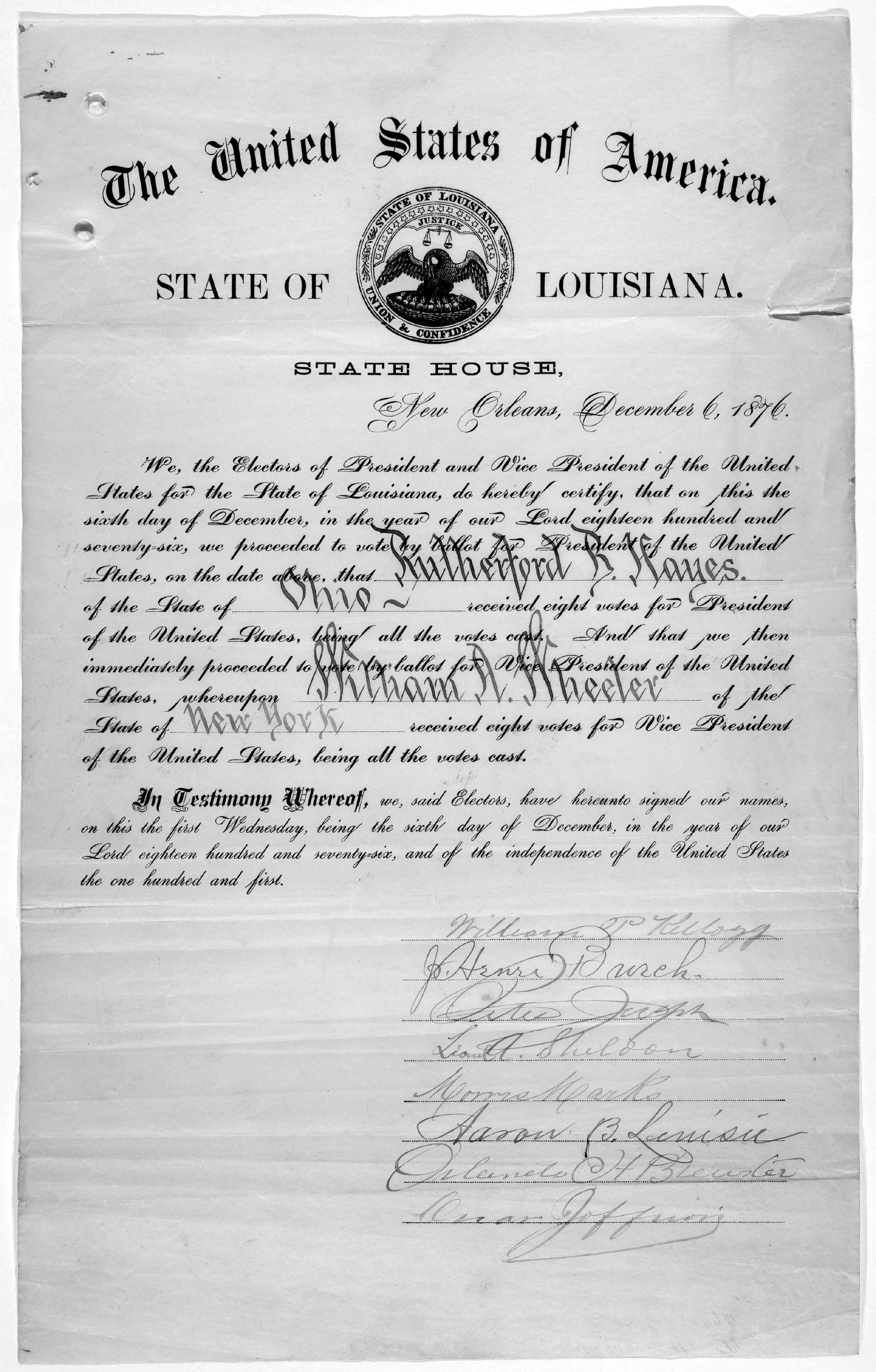
Pre-Electoral Count Act 1876 Louisiana electoral vote certificate for Rutherford B. Hayes

=== Pre-enactment history ===
During the nation's first century, at least "three great questions" about the electoral vote counting provisions in the Constitution frequently arose:

First, does the Constitution give the President of the Senate sole power to exercise whatever discretion the count involves, or are the two Houses of Congress the final judge of the validity of votes? Secondly, is the power to count merely the power to enumerate votes given by electors declared by state authority to have been appointed, or is there power to determine the correctness of the state authority's declaration and to examine the validity of the acts of the electors? Thirdly, whatever the scope of the power, how is the evidence necessary to a decision to be presented, and by what means is the decision to be made?

In 1865, Congress asserted "total power over the electoral vote" with the adoption of the Twenty-second Joint Rule. Enacted by strong Republican majorities in the wake of the Civil War, the rule provided simply that if any question arose about a state's electoral votes, the affirmative consent of both the House and Senate was required before the state's votes would be counted.

=== Enactment ===
The act was proposed soon after the extremely contentious 1876 presidential election and the Hayes-Tilden crisis, primarily in order to guide electoral disputes in a divided congress, which before the act might have resulted in the disenfranchisement of the state in question or alternatively a unilateral decision by the President of the Senate, the Vice President.

The Republican Senate passed four versions of the act, in 1878, 1882, 1884, and 1886, before its enactment. The earlier versions all failed in the House of Representatives which was mainly controlled by Democrats, who had a greater sensitivity toward states' rights. States' rights was a focal point of discussion on the legislation, as there was significant debate over the powers of Congress to determine the validity of electoral votes and set rules for the states.

The drafting of the act involved large amounts of passionate debate over many of its provisions. The primary questions debated were the "relative balance of power between federal and state authority concerning the counting of electoral votes" and the "distribution of congressional oversight across... the two chambers... and within the federal judiciary."

In 1886, the Democratic House passed a version of the act similar to the ones passed by the Senate previously, which was then enacted by a Republican Senate and Democratic House with minor concessions to the Democratic position as "a compromise measure in an atmosphere relatively free of partisan pressures" on February 4, 1887. Under the law, while Congress "claimed full power to validate votes, its role was limited to cases in which a state had failed to settle its own disputes and to questions beyond state competence." The act was stewarded through the Senate by George Frisbie Hoar throughout its many versions.

== State determination of controversies ==
Section 2 (now 3 U.S.C. § 5) gives each state an opportunity to resolve disputes relating to the appointment of electors if a state has enacted a law before Election Day that provides for a "final determination" of such disputes by "judicial or other methods or procedures," and such "determination" is made "at least six days before the time fixed for the meeting of electors." Such determination "shall be conclusive, and shall govern in the counting of the electoral votes ... so far as the ascertainment of the electors appointed by such State is concerned."

In the ruling of Bush v. Gore, the United States Supreme Court stated "the state legislature's power to select the manner for appointing electors is plenary; it may, if it so chooses, select the electors itself, which indeed was the manner used by state legislatures in several States for many years after the framing of our Constitution. ... The State, of course, after granting the franchise in the special context of Article II, can take back the power to appoint electors."

=== Safe harbor ===
Section 2 does not require a state to make a final determination by that date in order for its electoral votes to ultimately be counted by Congress. Rather, the Supreme Court has stated that the section "creates a 'safe harbor' insofar as congressional consideration of its electoral votes is concerned. If the state legislature has provided for final determination of contests or controversies by a law made prior to Election Day, that determination shall be conclusive if made at least six days prior to said time of meeting of the electors." In addition, since the section "contains a principle of federal law that would assure finality of the State's determination if made pursuant to a state law in effect before the election, a [state] legislative wish to take advantage of the 'safe harbor' would counsel against any construction of [state law] that Congress might deem to be a change in the law."

==== 2000 election ====
During the 2000 election recount, the U.S. Supreme Court in Bush v. Palm Beach County Canvassing Board remanded the election contest to the Florida Supreme Court, asking it to consider the implications of this section and the "safe harbor." Later, in Bush v. Gore, the U.S. Supreme Court observed that the state court had said that "the [state] legislature intended the State's electors to 'participate fully in the federal electoral process,' as provided in 3 U.S.C. § 5." With the deadline (safe harbor) date having arrived, the Court held that because Florida did not have a recount procedure in place that would both meet the deadline and comply with due process standards (as identified by the majority), the recounts ordered by the state court would be terminated. This effectively ended the election contest after Al Gore declined to pursue further litigation.

==== 2020 election ====
On December 3, 2020, Supreme Court Justice Samuel Alito set a deadline of December 8 (the safe-harbor date for 2020) for Pennsylvania officials to respond to a request to throw out the state's mail-in voting results, or possibly the entire Pennsylvania election in Representative Mike Kelly's suit at the Supreme Court. On December 8, the Supreme Court denied the application for a writ of injunction.

On December 7, 2020, Texas Attorney General Ken Paxton filed a suit in the Supreme Court, Texas v. Pennsylvania, alleging that Georgia, Michigan, Pennsylvania and Wisconsin violated both various federal and state laws by changing their election procedures in the run-up to the election. Numerous parties and states filed either in support of Texas or opposing it. Attorneys general of 20 states, two territories, the District of Columbia, and other various parties (only states and the District have voting electors) filed an opposing motion to dismiss the Texas lawsuit. Attorneys general from 18 states, members of defendant state legislatures, and other various parties filed in support of Texas; six of those states filed to join the lawsuit. The attorneys general of Ohio and Arizona filed neutral motions noting that the United States Supreme Court has a duty to rule on the matter however both expressed no further opinion. The Defendant state attorneys general argued that their claims are incorrect and would disenfranchise voters, while Plaintiffs argued that their mishandling of the election dilutes legal votes with fraudulent votes. The US Supreme Court affirmed that it had jurisdiction over the matter on December 11, 2020, but denied the motion for leave to file a bill of complaint for "lack of standing".

On December 27, 2020, Texas Representative Louis Gohmert filed a suit in US District Court seeking to give Vice President Mike Pence full authority to declare which slate of electors would be accepted by Congress. According to the National Review, even at the time the bill was enacted, some in Congress doubted whether the Act can bind a future Congress. The district court dismissed the suit for lack of standing on January 1, 2021. The dismissal was upheld by an appeals court panel the next day.

== Ascertainment process ==
During the election of 1876, Congress received electoral votes from multiple slates of electors in several Southern states. While the Twelfth Amendment describes how electors must meet and cast their votes, it did not foresee multiple competing slates of electoral votes from the same state. To help avoid this problem in future elections, Section 3 of the Electoral Count Act created an "ascertainment" process to help Congress determine who the state's valid electors are, including a role for the governor.

=== Certificate of ascertainment ===
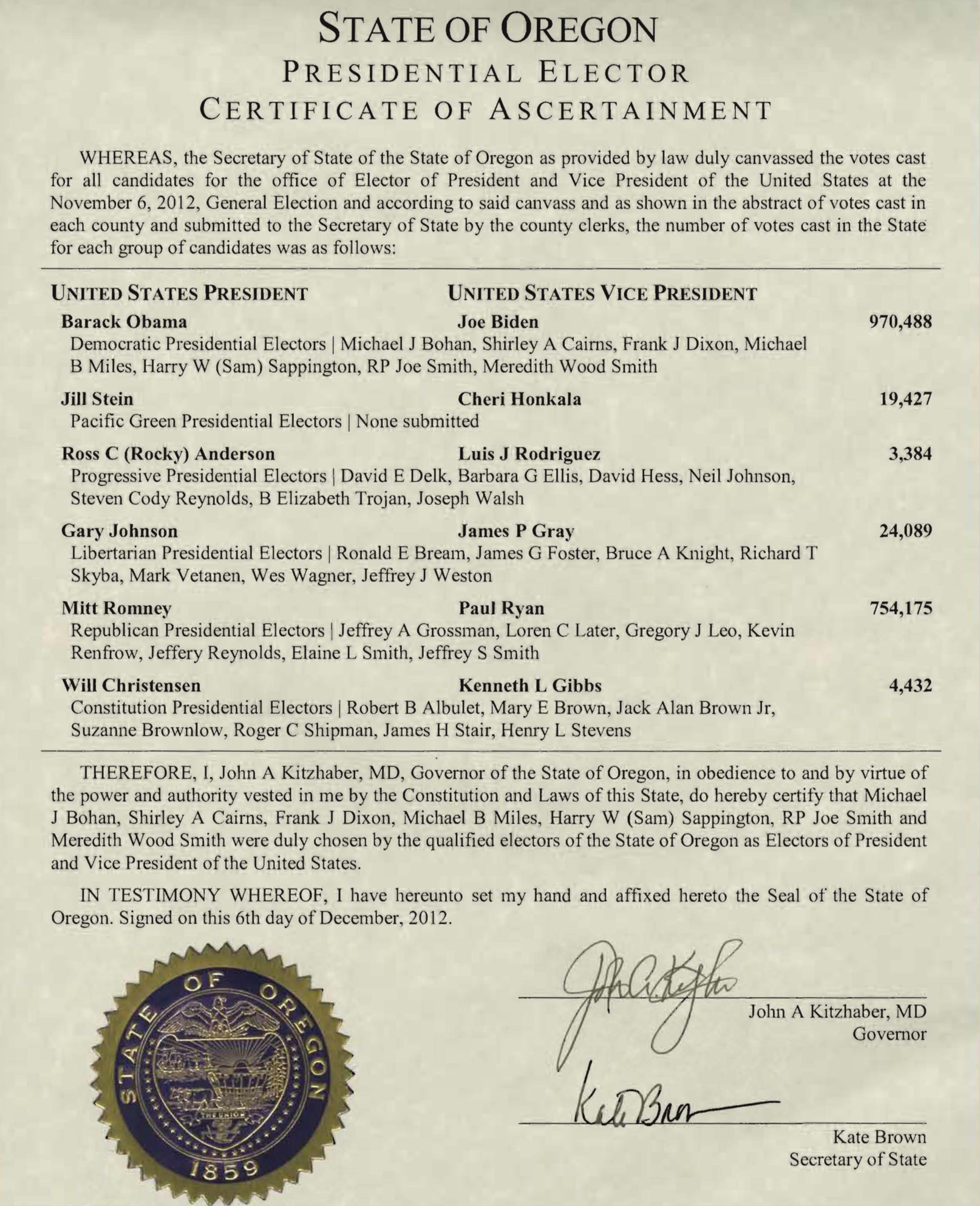
2012 Oregon Certificate of Ascertainment

Section 3 (now 3 U.S.C. § 6) requires the governor of each State to prepare seven original copies of a "certificate of ascertainment", each under the seal of the state, which identifies the electors appointed by the state and the votes they received, as well as the names of all other candidates for elector and the votes they received. The electors that are being appointed are determined "under and in pursuance of the laws of such State providing for such ascertainment." The name of the presidential candidate and vice-presidential candidate do not need to appear on the certificate; neither do the number of votes. The certificates only need to state the names of the slate of electors. Each state is free to choose the appearance and layout of the certificate. The Office of the Federal Register ensure that each certificate contains all legally required information, but substantive legal issues must be decided by the Congress and the Courts.

The certificate must be issued "as soon as practicable after the conclusion of the appointment of electors in [a] State by the final ascertainment, under and in pursuance of the laws of such State providing for such ascertainment ...." The certificates must be prepared as soon as possible after election day and copies must be delivered to the electors on or before the day on which they are required to meet and cast their votes. Details of the processing of the completed certificates varies between elections but, generally, sets of certificates must be sent to various state and federal officials including, by registered mail, to the Archivist of the United States. The Archivist will transmit sets to the House and Senate before the Electoral College meets.

=== Certificate of final determination ===
External image
- 2020 Presidential Election Certificates of Vote and Certificates of Ascertainment

If an election had been contested, 3 U.S.C. § 6 also provides that "if there shall have been any final determination in a state in the manner provided for by [state] law of a controversy or contest," then the governor must, "as soon as practicable after such determination," communicate, "under the seal of the State ... a certificate of such determination in form and manner as the same shall have been made."

Notably, the relevant clause in 3 U.S.C. § 6 differs substantively from the original clause in Section 3 of the 1887 law, as shown below:

- Old version: "if there shall have been any final determination in a State of a controversy or contest as provided for in section two of this act, it shall be the duty of the governor [to transmit a certificate of such determination etc.]"
- New version: "if there shall have been any final determination in a State in the manner provided for by law of a controversy or contest concerning the appointment of all or any of the electors of such State, it shall be the duty of the governor [etc.]"

Under the original version, the clause appears to apply only in situations where the final determination satisfies the Section 2 "safe harbor." The current version requires a certificate to be sent regardless of whether the safe harbor applies. The difference may be relevant since Section 4 (now 3 U.S.C. § 15) prohibits Congress from rejecting any electors "whose appointment has been lawfully certified to according to [3 U.S.C. § 6]." (See Substantive counting rules below.)

This process was used by the state of Florida following the 2000 election when it submitted a "Certificate of Final Determination of Contests Concerning the Appointment of Presidential Electors" that was signed by the governor and secretary of state. As narrated by an attorney in the Office of the Federal Register at the time:

[O]n December 12, the Supreme Court announced its decision in favor of Governor Bush.... While other lawyers argued over the full meaning of the Court's decision in Bush v. Gore, the Office of the Federal Register pored over it for a procedural path to formally end the dispute over Florida's electors. Because federal law did not account for a "re-ascertainment" of electors after a partial recount of votes, we had to devise a new form of document to suit the Court's opinion. The Florida Secretary of State submitted this unique final determination to us, and from our procedural point of view, the Florida electoral fight came to an end.

=== Certificate of vote ===
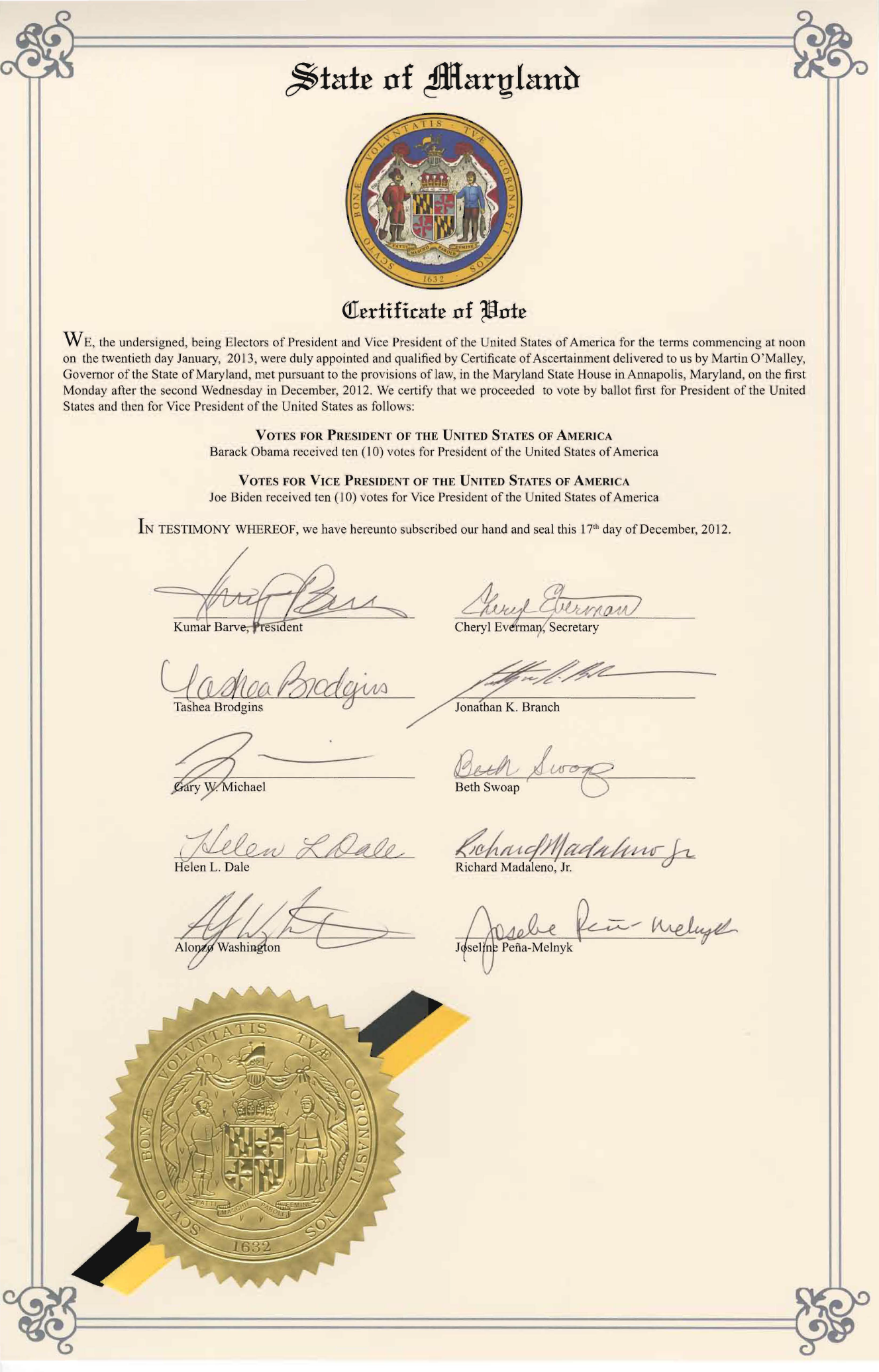
The 2012 Certificate of Vote issued by Maryland's delegation to the Electoral College

The electors meet to vote on the first Monday after the second Wednesday of December. As noted above, the Twelfth Amendment simply requires the electors to sign, certify, seal, and transmit their votes (now known as the "certificate of vote") to the president of the Senate. However, a clause in Section 3 required the governor to deliver certificates of ascertainment to the electors, to be "inclosed and transmitted" by them along with their votes. The electors must now make and sign six certificates of vote, and annex to each one of the list of electors that has been "furnished to them by direction of the governor." These are sent along with the certificates of ascertainment to the president of the Senate, the Archivist, the state's secretary of state, and the chief judge of the closest United States district court. One of each of the two pairs sent to the Archivist and the secretary of state are designated for public inspection, while the others (and the Chief Judge's copy) are "held subject to the order of the President of the United States Senate". The Archivist must receive the certificates by the fourth Wednesday in December, and may take "extraordinary measures to retrieve duplicate originals" otherwise.

=== Role of the Archivist ===
Section 3 originally required the transmission of certificates to the Secretary of State. The current law (3 U.S.C. § 6) assigns the relevant duties to the Archivist of the United States. The law requires the Archivist to preserve the certificates for one year, make them "a part of the public records of his office," and make them "open to public inspection." At the first meeting of the new Congress, the Archivist must transmit to both houses "copies in full of each and every such certificate so received." In modern practice, these and other administrative tasks related to the Electoral College are handled by the Office of the Federal Register (OFR) within the National Archives and Records Administration.

In the current era, OFR mails information packets to the state governors in the fall of each election year. After the election, OFR attorneys "carefully vet the facial legal sufficiency" of the certificates they have received. If correctable errors are discovered, they try to remedy them before Congress convenes the joint session to count the votes. While this process is not set out in statute, "the logic of the law" leaves it to the Office "to inform the officers of the House and Senate of any irregularities and to coordinate state and federal actions for the final counting of votes."

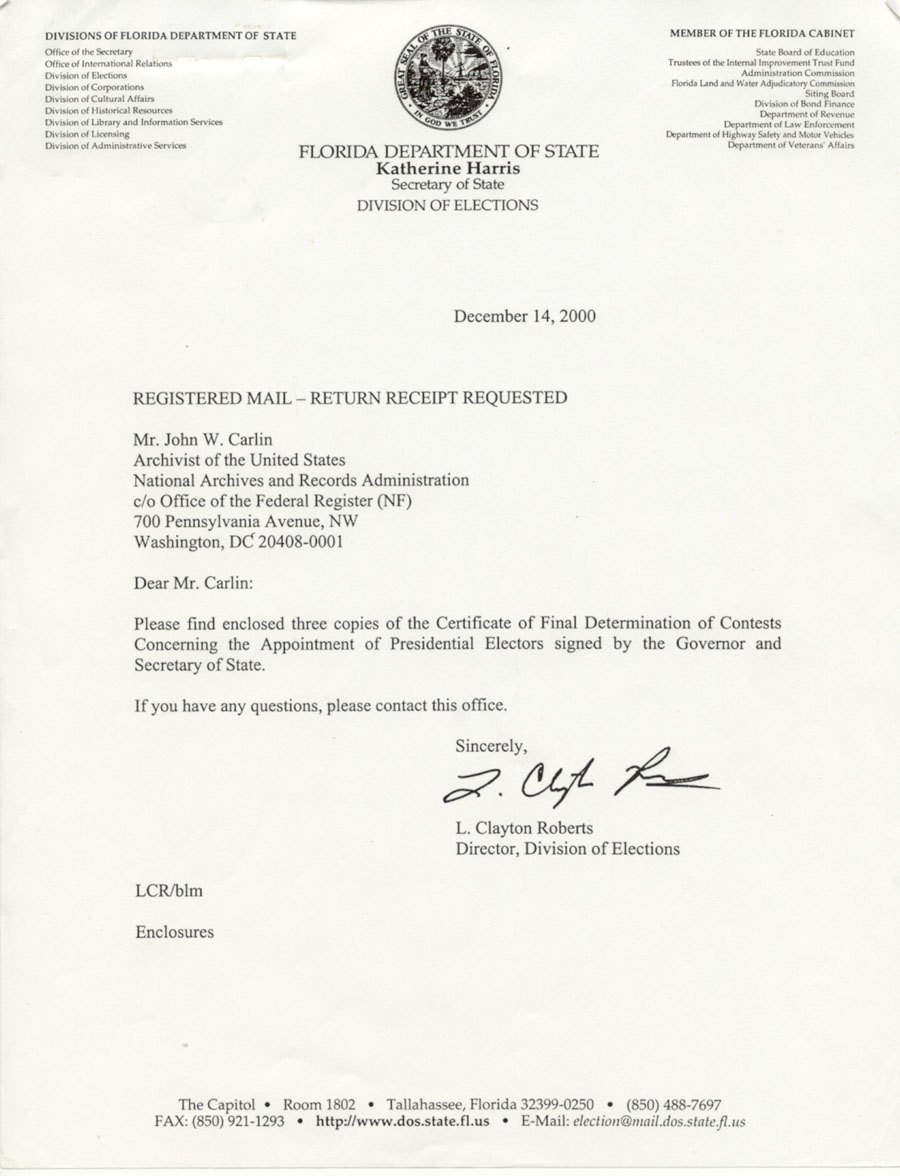
Florida's director of the Division of Elections forwarded that state's Certificate of Final Determination of Electors to Archivist John Carlin on December 14, 2000.

There are "more than a few things that can go wrong." OFR attorneys must sometimes track down "bewildered bureaucrats" surprised to learn of their duties, with some state officials even claiming that their state has "abolished" the Electoral College. In some instances, federal officials including members of Congress have been chosen to serve as electors, in violation of Article II which states that "no Senator or Representative, or person holding an office of trust or profit under the United States, shall be appointed an elector." OFR has retrieved certificates from a variety of places, "rummaged through mailbags" on Christmas Eve, called on state police to help find electors who forgot to sign the Certificate of Vote, etc., to correct problems before Congress meets to count the votes.

Following the 2000 election, the Florida Legislature contacted OFR seeking to learn the technical process to revoke the ascertainment of electors certified by the secretary of state, and replace it with a new set of electors to be appointed directly by the Legislature under Article II of the Constitution. OFR advised that while there was no precedent for such a "do-over," it would "work out a way to follow the Constitution and federal law." The Supreme Court decision in Bush v. Gore made the matter moot.

== Counting procedures ==
Section 4 of the Electoral Count Act (now 3 U.S.C. § 15) provides both detailed procedures and counting rules for specific situations. It significantly expands upon the Twelfth Amendment, which states only that "The President of the Senate shall, in the presence of the Senate and House of Representatives, open all the certificates and the votes shall then be counted."

This central section of the Electoral Count Act has been significantly criticized. It is a "mammoth section some 814 words in length" that makes for difficult parsing, and "[m]any of its substantive rules are set out in a single sentence that is 275 words long."

=== Procedures for joint session ===
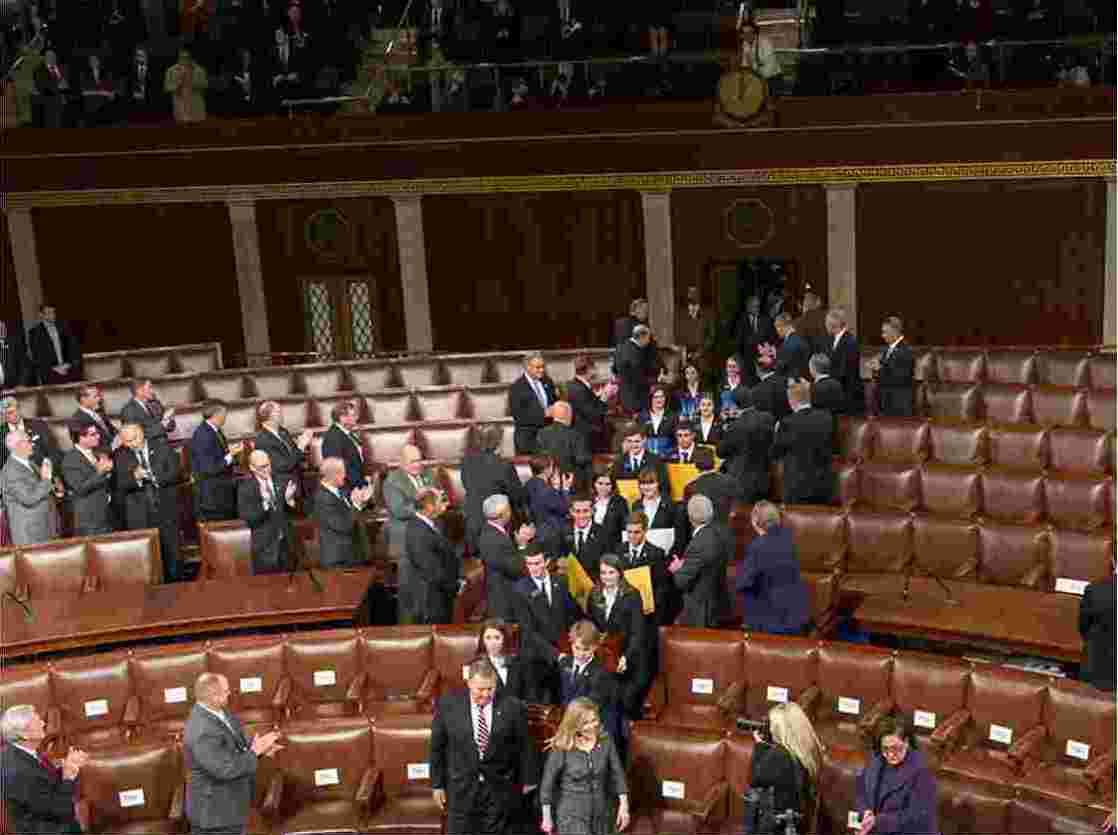
Electoral votes are counted in a joint session of Congress, 2017

Under Section 4 (3 U.S.C. § 15), Congress is required to be in session on January 6 following the election to count the votes, although this date can be changed by law. Due to the 20th Amendment, the joint session is conducted by the new Congress whose term begins on January 3, rather than the outgoing lame-duck Congress. The Senate and House must meet in the House Chamber at "1 o'clock in the afternoon" on January 6, and the president of the Senate – the sitting vice president of the United States – is the presiding officer. Section 7 (3 U.S.C. § 16) specifies the seating arrangements in the House chamber.

Two tellers must be "previously appointed" by the Senate and two tellers by the House of Representatives. The president of the Senate must open all the "certificates" and "papers purporting to be certificates" of the electoral votes, and hand them to the four tellers as they are opened. The certificates and papers must be "opened, presented, and acted upon in the alphabetical order of the States, beginning with the letter A." The tellers, "having read the [papers] in the presence and hearing of the two Houses," must "make a list of the votes as they shall appear from the ... certificates."

If there are any objections to the returns from any state (see Substantive counting rules below), they must be resolved before the process can continue to the next state: "No votes or papers from any other State shall be acted upon until the objections previously made to the votes or papers from any State shall have been finally disposed of." For an objection to be considered and voted on, it must be in writing and made by at least one representative and one senator. This has happened only four times. The first time was in 1969, with an objection to a faithless elector in North Carolina. The second was on January 6, 2005, with a formal challenge to Ohio's electoral votes. Two objections were made at the 2021 United States Electoral College vote count. On January 6, 2021, an objection was made to Arizona's electoral votes by Representative Paul Gosar and Senator Ted Cruz, and on January 7, an objection was made to Pennsylvania's electoral votes by Representative Scott Perry and Senator Joshua Hawley. In 2022, with the passage of the Electoral Count Reform and Presidential Transition Improvement Act of 2022, the requirement was raised to require signatures from one-fifth of the members of each chamber.

=== Debate rules ===
The structure of the Electoral Count Act's procedural provisions generally requires that any questions arising during the counting process be determined by the two houses acting separately, rather than by both houses together on the House floor. Section 5 (now 3 U.S.C. § 18) states that "the President of the Senate shall have power to preserve order; and no debate shall be allowed and no question shall be put by the presiding officer except to either House on a motion to withdraw." Section 6 (now 3 U.S.C. § 17) states that whenever the two Houses have separated "to decide upon an objection ... or other question arising in the matter," each senator and representative may "speak to such objection or question" for five minutes, and not more than once. After the debate has lasted two hours, the presiding officer of each House must "put the main question without further debate." Once the two houses have both voted, "they shall immediately again meet, and the presiding officer shall then announce the decision of the questions submitted."

Section 7 (now 3 U.S.C. § 16) states that the joint session cannot be dissolved "until the count of electoral votes shall be completed and the result declared." No recess can be taken "unless a question shall have arisen in regard to counting any such votes, or otherwise under [Title 3, Chapter 1]," in which case either House, acting separately, can recess itself until 10:00 am the next day (Sunday excepted). But if the counting of the electoral votes and the declaration of the result have not been completed before the fifth calendar day after the joint session began, "no further or other recess shall be taken by either House."

=== Role of the vice president ===
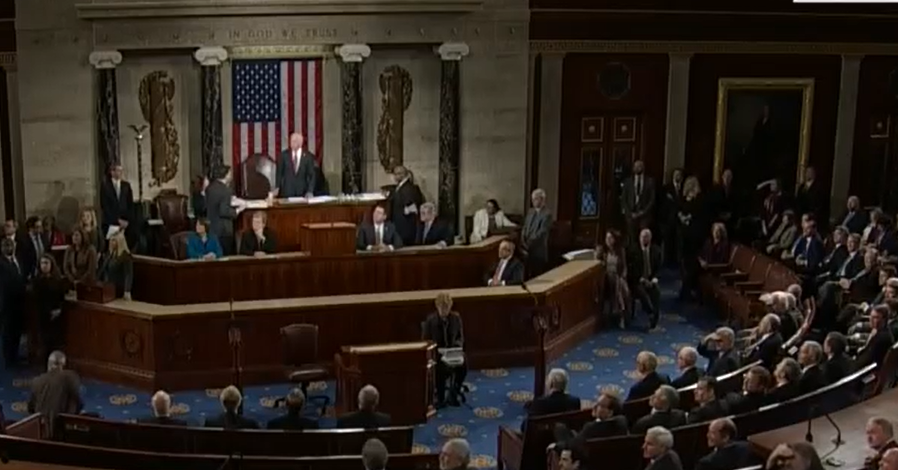
Biden presiding over the 2017 electoral college vote counting

The Constitution instructs that electoral votes must be sent to the president of the Senate – who is the sitting vice president of the United States – and that the Senate president must "open all the certificates" in the presence of both houses. However, the sitting vice president is sometimes a candidate for president in the election, is often a candidate for re-election to the vice presidency, and is almost always a partisan with a keen interest in the outcome. Recognizing this, one key purpose of the Electoral Count Act's procedural provisions is "to drain away as much power as possible from the Senate president, whom the [law] appoints to preside at the joint session when Congress counts the votes."

As the custodian for papers, the Senate president is required by the Constitution to "open all the certificates," which the Act further describes as "all the certificates and papers purporting to be certificates." In doing so, the goal of the Act "was to reduce the Senate President's discretionary power as gatekeeper to the absolute minimum...." Indeed, in one case from 1889, papers sent as a "practical joke" were presented to the joint session. Whether the Senate president can be required to present or not present any particular paper is an open question, but one commentator argues that concurrent action by both houses would settle the matter while disagreement between the houses would see the Senate president's decision upheld.

The Electoral Count Act's provisions governing debate and procedure, prescribed to be followed by the Senate president as the presiding officer during the joint session, are unusually specific (see above), with one early commentator describing them as "exhaustive" and as good "as human wit can divine." These provisions "seem designed to drain as much power as possible away from the Chair and give it to the two houses." After the 2000 election, Vice President Al Gore ruled that a number of procedural motions were out of order by extending the Act's formal requirements for substantive objections – that is, to be presented in writing and signed by both a Representative and a Senator – to procedural questions. This suggests that if procedural motions and appeals were made in that manner, they would be allowed and the two houses would have to separate to consider them.

== Substantive counting rules ==
The structure of Section 4 (3 U.S.C. § 15) separates the substantive counting rules primarily in two sentences. The first describes the rule for making objections, and includes limits on congressional rejection of votes where "but one return [from the state] has been received." The second, very lengthy sentence relates to situations where "more than one return or paper purporting to be a return" has been received."

=== Single return ===
Under Section 4 (3 U.S.C. § 15), upon reading of "any certificate or paper, the president of the Senate shall call for objections, if any." Every objection must be made in writing, and must "state clearly and concisely, and without argument," the ground for the objection. It must be signed by at least one senator and one member of the House of Representatives before the objection can be received. Once all objections to any vote or paper from a state have been received and read, the Senate withdraws and the two houses consider the objections separately.

However, when considering such objections, Section 4 requires that – assuming "but one return [from the state] has been received" – no electoral votes from electors whose appointment has been "lawfully certified" under the ascertainment process (see above) can be rejected. The two houses may only reject a vote or votes if both houses agree that such vote(s) have not been "regularly given" by an individual elector or electors. Under the law, Congress may still reject a state's electors if both houses decide to do so, but only when they determine either that the appointment of electors was not "lawfully certified" by the governor under the ascertainment process, or that the votes themselves were not "regularly given" by the electors.

The phrase "regularly given" is generally understood as referring to issues regarding an elector's actual vote, rather than whether the elector has been properly appointed. It could include, for example, situations where an elector cast a particular vote because of bribery or corruption, or mistake or fraud. It may also include situations where the elector did not vote in accordance with applicable constitutional and statutory requirements.

Notably, this portion of Section 4 applies to all cases where a single return is received, regardless of whether the safe harbor under Section 2 (3 U.S.C. § 5) applies or not. Since safe harbor determinations are supposed to be "conclusive," there is some tension between the provisions since Section 4 still allows for Congress to reject a state's votes. One commentator finds the conflict "more apparent than real," arguing that Section 4 only allows for rejection of safe-harbor electoral votes in cases involving "the electors' post-ascertainment conduct" and to "constitutional infirmities in their status as electors or in the votes they cast."

==== History ====
This provision of the law was designed to resolve the significant question in the nineteenth century regarding the proper role of Congress in reviewing controversies about which electors a state had appointed. It has been described as reflecting a balance between giving Congress unfettered ability to reject a state's electoral votes vs. deferring to state determinations, which was a significant topic of discussion during the Reconstruction era.

===== 1968 =====
The first time an objection occurred was in 1969, in response to a faithless elector from North Carolina who voted for George Wallace instead of Richard Nixon. Representative James O'Hara and Senator Edmund Muskie raised the objection, which was subsequently rejected by each chamber by a vote of 170–228 in the House and 33–58 in the Senate.

===== 2004 =====
After the 2004 United States presidential election, Senator Barbara Boxer of California joined Representative Stephanie Tubbs Jones of Ohio in filing a congressional objection to the certification of Ohio's Electoral College votes due to alleged irregularities including disqualification of provisional ballots, alleged misallocation of voting machines, and disproportionally long waits in poor and predominantly African-American communities. The Senate voted the objection down 1–74; the House voted the objection down 31–267.

===== 2020 =====
Following on attempts to overturn the 2020 United States presidential election leading up to congressional certification, Representative Paul Gosar and Senator Ted Cruz filed an objection to the certification of the electoral votes of Arizona. The two houses withdrew and debated the objection, but were evacuated during an attack on the Capitol by pro-Trump protesters. After the crowd was expelled and the Capitol secured, the question was taken up again and the Senate rejected it 6–93 and the House rejected it 121–303. Representative Scott Perry and Senator Josh Hawley later filed an objection to the electoral votes of Pennsylvania with the result that the objection was rejected 7–92 in the Senate and 138–282 in the House.

=== Multiple returns ===
In cases where multiple returns have been submitted from a state, Section 4 (3 U.S.C. § 15) seeks "[to direct] Congress away from an open ended search for the proper return, and towards the simpler issues of identifying the state's final determination authority and whether that institution had reached its decision according to the terms and conditions of [3 U.S.C. § 5]." It seeks to "reduce to a minimum the cases where any difference can properly arise." In one sentence of 275 words, the law appears to envision three different scenarios:

If there are multiple returns yet only one is compliant with the safe harbor, then the safe harbor return must be counted as the true return, assuming the votes have been "regularly given" by the electors. If more than one return, or paper purporting to be a return, from a state is received by the president of the Senate, then the only votes to be counted are those that have been "regularly given" by those electors (or their validly-appointed successors) who are shown by the "determination" mentioned in 3 U.S.C. § 5 ("safe harbor") to have been appointed, assuming the determination has been made.

If two or more returns from a state can claim the safe harbor, then neither will be counted unless both houses agree to count one of them as the true return supported by state law. In case the question arises "which of two or more ... State authorities determining what electors have been appointed, as mentioned in [3 U.S.C. § 5], is the lawful tribunal of such State," then votes "regularly given" will only be counted from electors that the two houses, acting separately, concurrently decide is supported by "the decision of such State so authorized by its law." This appears to be Congress' response to the problem of dueling state governments that arose during the election of 1876.

If there are multiple returns yet none can claim the safe harbor, one return can be counted if both houses agree it complies with state law, and were "regularly given" by the electors. If there has been "no such determination of the question in the State aforesaid," votes will only be counted that the two houses concurrently decide were cast by "lawful electors appointed in accordance with the laws of the State," unless the two Houses, acting separately, concurrently decide "such votes not to be the lawful votes of the legally appointed electors of such State." Read in isolation, it would mean that one return can be counted as the true return if both houses agree it complies with state law, unless both houses further agree the votes themselves were not "regularly given" by the electors.

However, this critical sentence then follows: "But if the two Houses shall disagree in respect of the counting of such votes, then ... the votes of the electors whose appointment has been certified by the executive of the State, under the seal thereof, shall be counted."

==== Scope of governor's tiebreaker ====
Commentators have differed over the interplay between the governor's "tiebreaker" sentence and the lengthy 275-word sentence that precedes it. There is broad agreement that the tiebreaker must modify the third scenario of multiple returns where none can claim the safe harbor. However, a possible ambiguity involves the second scenario in which multiple returns do claim the safe harbor:

One conceptual possibility is that this new sentence operates upon the immediately preceding clause, the one concerning what to do when none of multiple returns are claimed to have Safe Harbor status. The other conceptual possibility is that this new sentence operates upon all preceding clauses involving multiple returns, both when none claim Safe Harbor status and when more than one so claim.

L. Kinvin Wroth, writing in 1960, stated that the tiebreaker only applies to the third scenario, in which there has been no safe harbor determination by state authorities. Thus, in the second scenario where two returns claiming the safe harbor are received, "[i]f the Houses cannot agree ... no vote from the state in question is counted. This result follows regardless of the governor's action." In 2001, a Congressional Research Service report authored by Jack Maskell "embraced Wroth's view of the statute, citing and quoting Wroth's article extensively." Maskell's CRS report also added more arguments based on the legislative history of the Electoral Count Act.

For example, Senator George Hoar, who introduced the tiebreaker as a floor amendment, mentions it only in the context of the third scenario where there is no safe harbor determination. Senator Hoar stated that "if the amendment which I have proposed shall be adopted no case can arise under this bill of rejecting the vote of any State except in the single case of dual State governments," seemingly referring to the second scenario above. Hoar said the bill tells a State: "Appoint your own judicature in your own fashion to determine this question; if you do not do it, we shall assume that you desire that the certificate of your governor shall determine it."

In contrast, Stephen A. Siegel argues textually that based on punctuation, the tiebreaker provision should be read "as relating to the entire preceding sentence, not just to the clause after the final semicolon." Siegel viewed the main purpose of amendments that led to the tiebreaker being added as being to "respond to congressmen concerned about the power of one house of Congress to disenfranchise a state when there were multiple returns." He reads the legislative history differently, and notes that the conference report states as follows:

The general effect of all [the reconciling amendments], and of the bill as report ..., is to provide for the decision of all questions that may arise as to its electoral vote to the State itself, and where, for any reason, that fails, then the Houses circumscribe their power to the minimum under any circumstances to disfranchise a State, and such result can only happen when the State shall fail to provide the means for the final and conclusive decision of all controversies as to her vote.

Siegel also argues that if the two Houses disagree about whether a return claiming the safe harbor has actually satisfied the safe harbor requirements, the Wroth–Maskell reading would prevent them from counting any other return. That is, "a return that claims (safe harbor) status may not trump all, but it does forestall all," which Siegel argues is not what Congress could have intended.

==== History ====
These provisions were a reaction to the problem of multiple returns encountered in the 1876 United States presidential election, before the Electoral Count Act was passed. From four states – Florida, Louisiana, South Carolina and Oregon – two sets of returns were transmitted to Washington, D.C.

Hawaii became a state in 1959. In its first presidential election in 1960, Vice President Richard Nixon was understood to have won the popular vote by a narrow 141 vote margin: Governor William Quinn certified the Republican electors, and they cast Hawaii's three electoral votes for Nixon. When the election was challenged in court, the Democratic electors cast three electoral votes for President-elect John F. Kennedy, but cast them later than the safe harbor deadline. A certification for the Democratic votes was issued when a recount resulted in Kennedy being declared winner by 115 votes. When both Democratic and Republican electoral votes from Hawaii were presented for counting, Senate President Nixon, in accordance with a prior court ruling, suggested that the Democratic votes "be considered as the lawful electors from the State of Hawaii ... [i]f there be no objection in this joint convention". The votes for Kennedy were then counted by Congress.

In 2020, several Republican groups, including some groups of electors slated by the Republican Party and defeated in popular voting, cited the Hawaii precedent and held events naming alternative electors who would vote for Donald Trump. None of these electors was appointed as an elector by any organ of state government, or certified as electors by their state governors. Moreover, all states except Wisconsin had certified their results by the "safe harbor" deadline, which under the Act is "conclusive." None of those certifications included these alternative electors. Observers, including the conservative National Review, described these electors as "extralegal," "bizarro," and "hav[ing] no actual significance."

== Results ==
Once the votes have been "ascertained and counted in the manner and according to the rules ... provided" by the Act, "the results ... shall be delivered [by the tellers] to the president of the Senate." The Senate president "shall thereupon announce the state of the vote, which announcement shall be deemed a sufficient declaration of the persons, if any, elected President and Vice-President of the United States." An earlier version of the bill would have required the Senate president to announce "the names of persons, if any, elected," but the phrase was stricken with the Conference Report explaining that the reason for the change was "to prevent the President from doing more than announcing the state of the vote as ascertained and delivered to him by the tellers...."

=== Majority of electors ===
To be elected by the electoral college, the Constitution requires that a candidate receive "a majority of the whole number of Electors appointed." One early virtue of this wording was that if certain states decided not to participate in the election by failing to appoint any electors, a president could still be elected by a majority of those who were appointed.

However, when Congress rejects a state's electoral vote, or chooses not to count any of multiple competing returns, "the effect that decision has on the denominator that determines whether a candidate has more than fifty percent of the electoral vote is an entirely open issue." For example, if there are currently 538 total votes, and all votes from a state that appointed 20 electors are rejected, a majority could either remain as 270 votes out of 538, or be reduced to 260 votes out of 518. Historical precedent is split, and in those previous cases where a state's electors were rejected or considered for rejection (for example, in 1872), it has never determined whether the winning candidate had achieved a majority. "Perhaps because the diversity of strongly held views might imperil the delicate web of compromises supporting the [Electoral Count Act], Congress avoided addressing the issue in the [Electoral Count Act]."

A future joint session "might be called upon to address the effect of this situation" without clear precedents. While Congress would likely be able to decide the issue by a vote of both houses during a future session, if one house finds that a candidate has achieved a majority and the other house disagrees, the Electoral Count Act provides no default rule nor any path forward. The Senate president's role is strictly limited by the Act to receiving the tellers' lists and "announc[ing] the state of the vote.". The Senate president does not announce "the names of persons elected," since Congress specifically rejected that option as explained above.

If no candidate is determined to have a majority, then the contingent election procedure described in the Twelfth Amendment would be used. The House, voting by state delegation, would elect the president as happened in 1824, and the Senate would elect the vice president as happened in 1836.

=== Failure to complete process ===
By imposing strict limits on procedures, debate, and recesses, the Electoral Count Act is designed to help Congress achieve an election result before the term of the outgoing president ends. Nevertheless, if no new president (or vice president) has been elected by that time, the Twentieth Amendment and the Presidential Succession Act would mean that the Speaker of the House would be sworn in as acting president. Notably, Section 1 of the amendment makes clear that the terms of the outgoing president and vice president shall end on January 20 at noon; they cannot be extended except by constitutional amendment.

One commentator has described situations in which ambiguities under the Electoral Count Act could cause the two houses to disagree about whether the electoral count has been completed, or to disagree about whether a new president has been chosen, and describes a situation where this could lead to competing claims to the presidency.

== Constitutionality ==
At least one commentator, Vasan Kesavan, has argued at length that the Electoral Count Act is unconstitutional, arguing that the counting scheme must be established by way of constitutional amendment:

This article argues that the Electoral Count Act, specifically 3 U.S.C. § 15, is unconstitutional. The Electoral Count Act violates the text and structure of the Constitution in multiple ways. For example, where is the font of express or implied power to pass the Electoral Count Act? Where does Congress have the power to regulate the manner of presidential election? Where do the Electoral College Clauses provide for bicameralism in counting electoral votes? What gives the 49th Congress (of 1887) the authority to bind future Congresses and joint conventions in counting electoral votes? More generally: What gives the joint convention the power to judge the validity of electoral votes? The counting function seems to be arithmetic and ministerial. If the joint convention could judge electoral votes, it could reject enough votes to thwart the electors' will or trigger a contingency election for President in the House of Representatives and for Vice President in the Senate, thereby arrogating to the two Houses of Congress the power to appoint the Nation's two highest executive officers.

However, Kesavan admits:

The prevailing wisdom, in the Supreme Court and elsewhere, is that the Electoral Count Act is constitutional.

=== Gohmert et al. v. Pence ===
==== District Court ====
On December 27, 2020, seeking to change results expected from counting of electoral votes required to take place on January 6, 2021, Texas Representative Louie Gohmert and several Arizona Republicans filed a lawsuit in the U.S. District Court seeking a declaration that the Electoral Count Act was unconstitutional and that Vice President Pence had the full freedom to reject any and all electoral vote certificates unilaterally, with no recourse to appeal by either House of Congress. The Justice Department, representing Pence in his official capacity, responded with an argument that the issues raised by the suit should be addressed to the House and Senate, not to the Vice President; not doing so, the department said, represented a "walking legal contradiction" as Gohmert was suing the person whose power he sought to further. In an amicus brief, the House of Representatives concurred. On January 1, 2021, Judge Jeremy Kernodle dismissed the case saying all of the plaintiffs lack standing and therefore the court "is without subject matter jurisdiction".

==== Court of Appeals ====
On appeal, the three-judge panel of the Fifth Circuit Court of Appeals dismissed the case on January 2, finding, for the same reasons as did the district court, that "no plaintiff has... standing."

==== Supreme Court ====
On January 6, 2021, the plaintiffs (acting as applicants) petitioned Justice Alito for an administrative stay, which was referred to the full court. The applicants asked that the court direct the vice president to refrain from invoking the dispute-resolution provisions of the ECA, pending resolution of a petition of a writ of certiorari. On January 7, the application was denied by the court. The entire case became moot because the counting of electoral votes commenced on January 6 and completed in the early morning of January 7.

== Clarifications and revisions ==
In 1961, Vice President Richard Nixon, acting as presiding officer of the joint session for counting the electoral votes of the 1960 U.S. presidential election, suggested that congress follow a ruling allowing the certification of late-filed votes against him, which congress did. In 1969, Hubert Humphrey recused himself from the count. In 2001, 2017 and again in 2021, incumbent vice presidents who were also executive candidates, overruled objections to counting the certificates of votes that were favorable to their opponents.

Some of the provisions of the bill (2022 bill revision):

- Identify each state's governor as responsible for submitting certificates of ascertainment, unless otherwise specified by state laws or constitutions.
- Provide for expedited review, including a three-judge panel with a direct appeal to the Supreme Court, of certain claims related to a state's certificate identifying its electors.
- Require Congress to defer to slates of electors submitted by a state's executive pursuant to the judgments of state or federal courts.
- Clarify that the vice president cannot solely determine, accept, reject, or otherwise adjudicate disputes over electors.
- Raise objection threshold from one member of each chamber to 20% of each chamber.
- Prohibit state legislatures from modifying the mandated election period unless necessitated by "extraordinary and catastrophic" events.
