= Title 3 of the United States Code =

U.S. federal statutes on the role of the President

Title 3 of the United States Code outlines the role of the President of the United States in the United States Code. It was enacted by the Title 3 U.S.C. "The President" Act, 1948

== Chapter 1—Presidential Elections and Vacancies ==
This chapter deals with elections for President every four years, and vacancies.

Chapter 1: Presidential Elections and Vacancies

1. § 1. Time of appointing electors
2. § 2. Repealed
3. § 3. Number of electors
4. § 4. Vacancies in electoral college
5. § 5. Certificate of ascertainment of appointment of electors
6. § 6. Duties of Archivist
7. § 7. Meeting and vote of electors
8. § 8. Manner of voting
9. § 9. Certificates of votes for President and Vice President
10. § 10. Sealing and endorsing certificates
11. § 11. Transmission of certificates by electors
12. § 12. Failure of certificates of electors to reach President of the Senate or Archivist of the United States; demand on State for certificate
13. § 13. Same; demand on district judge for certificate
14. § 14. Repealed
15. § 15. Counting electoral votes in Congress
16. § 16. Same; seats for officers and Members of two Houses in joint session
17. § 17. Same; limit of debate in each House
18. § 18. Same; parliamentary procedure at joint session
19. § 19. Vacancy in offices of both President and Vice President; officers eligible to act
20. § 20. Resignation or refusal of office
21. § 21. Definitions
22. § 22. Severability

== Chapters 2–5 ==
- Chapter 2: Office and Compensation of President
- Chapter 3: Protection of the President; United States Secret Service Uniformed Division
- Chapter 4: Delegation of Functions
- Chapter 5: Extension of Certain Rights and Protections to Presidential Offices
