= Presidential Succession Act =

Law regarding the order of succession to United States president

The United States Presidential Succession Act is a federal statute establishing the presidential line of succession. Article II, Section 1, Clause 6 of the United States Constitution authorizes Congress to enact such a statute:

Congress may by Law provide for the Case of Removal, Death, Resignation or Inability, both of the President and Vice President, declaring what Officer shall then act as President, and such Officer shall act accordingly, until the Disability be removed, or a President shall be elected.

Congress has enacted a Presidential Succession Act on three occasions: 1792 (1 Stat. 239), 1886 (24 Stat. 1), and 1947 (61 Stat. 380). The 1947 Act was last revised in 2006.

Although none of these succession acts have ever been invoked, an invocation was a distinct possibility on several occasions. However, the future likelihood that a person in the line of succession beyond the vice president will be called upon under normal circumstances to be acting president has diminished greatly due to the Twenty-fifth Amendment's provision for filling vice presidential vacancies.

== Presidential Succession Act of 1792 ==
Article II, Section 1, Clause 6 of the Constitution authorizes Congress to declare who should act as president if both the president and vice president died or were otherwise unavailable to serve during their terms of office. Legislation to establish such a line of succession was introduced in December 1790 in the United States House of Representatives, in the 1st Congress. When brought up for discussion the following month, the president pro tempore of the United States Senate and the speaker of the House of Representatives were proposed; the United States secretary of state and the chief justice of the United States were as well. Lawmakers failed to reach consensus on who should be the statutory successor. Naming the secretary of state was unacceptable to most Federalists, as they did not want the office's then-occupant, Thomas Jefferson, the leader of the growing anti-administration opposition that would become the Democratic-Republican Party, placed so close to the presidency. Constitutional and policy objections were raised to naming the president pro tempore of the Senate or the speaker of the House, as it was assumed the individual would retain their office and seat in Congress while temporarily performing duties of the presidency; similar separation of powers concerns were also raised regarding the chief justice.

The matter was raised again when the 2nd Congress convened later in 1791. On November 30, the Senate approved legislation titled "An act relative to the election of a President and Vice President of the United States, and declaring the officer who shall act as President in case of vacancies in the offices both of President and Vice President", which was sent to the House for concurrence. It contained a provision naming the president pro tempore of the Senate, or, if that office were vacant, the speaker of the House as acting president if a vacancy arose in both the presidency and vice presidency. Various representatives, including a number of the Constitution's framers, criticized the arrangement as being contrary to their intent. As a result, after a contentious debate, on February 15, 1792, the House struck out the president pro tempore and speaker and inserted the secretary of state in their place. The Senate rejected the House change a few days later, and the House relented. The bill became law on March 1, 1792, with the signature of President George Washington.

The Presidential Succession Act of 1792, sections 9 and 10 of a larger act regarding the election of the president and vice president, provided that the president pro tempore of the Senate would be first in line for the presidency should the offices of the president and the vice president both be vacant. The speaker of the House was second in line. Section 9 provided that the statutory successor would serve in an acting capacity until a new president could be elected. (Note: Under the original procedure for choosing the President and Vice President prescribed by Article II, Section 1, Clause 3, of the Constitution, each presidential elector cast two votes for President; at least one of the individuals voted for had to be from a state different from the elector's. The individual with the majority of votes became President, and the runner-up became Vice President.) If such a double vacancy occurred, Section 10 directed the secretary of state to notify the governor of each state of the vacancies and of the special election to fill them. This special election would take place no fewer than two months later. The persons elected president and vice president in such a special election would have served a full four-year term beginning on March 4 of the next year; no such election ever took place.

=== Potential implementation ===
While the succession provisions of the 1792 Act were never invoked, there were ten instances when the vice presidency was vacant:

- April 20, 1812 – March 4, 1813 (318 days) following the death of George Clinton
- November 23, 1814 – March 4, 1817 (2 years, 101 days) following the death of Elbridge Gerry
- December 28, 1832 – March 4, 1833 (66 days) following the resignation of John C. Calhoun
- April 4, 1841 – March 4, 1845 (3 years, 334 days) following the accession of John Tyler to the presidency
- July 9, 1850 – March 4, 1853 (2 years, 238 days) following the accession of Millard Fillmore to the presidency
- April 18, 1853 – March 4, 1857 (3 years, 320 days) following the death of William R. King
- April 15, 1865 – March 4, 1869 (3 years, 323 days) following the accession of Andrew Johnson to the presidency
- November 22, 1875 – March 4, 1877 (1 year, 102 days) following the death of Henry Wilson
- September 19, 1881 – March 4, 1885 (3 years, 166 days) following the accession of Chester A. Arthur to the presidency
- November 25, 1885 – March 4, 1889 (3 years, 99 days) following the death of Thomas A. Hendricks

In each case, had the incumbent president died, resigned, been removed from office or been disabled during one of these vice presidential vacancies, the president pro tempore of the Senate would have become the acting president. Such a double vacancy nearly occurred on three occasions:

- In 1844, President John Tyler narrowly missed being one of the several people killed when a gun on the newly built USS Princeton exploded during a ceremonial cruise. Had Tyler died, Senate President pro tempore Willie Person Mangum would have become acting president.
- In 1865, the conspirators in the assassination of Abraham Lincoln planned, but failed, to assassinate Vice President Andrew Johnson and Secretary of State William H. Seward as well. Had Johnson also been killed, Senate President pro tempore Lafayette S. Foster would have become acting president.
- In 1868, after President Andrew Johnson was impeached by the House of Representatives, the Senate came one vote short of removing Johnson from office in his impeachment trial. Had he been removed, President pro tempore Benjamin Wade would have become acting president, as the vice-presidency remained vacant after Johnson succeeded to the presidency.

As a consequence of the sometimes lengthy vacancies in the office of vice president, the person serving as president pro tempore of the Senate garnered heightened importance, for although he did not assume the vice presidency, he was then next in line for the presidency. Several who served during these vacancies were referred to informally as "Acting Vice President".

== Presidential Succession Act of 1886 ==
Presidential Succession Act of 1886
- Other short titles: Act of January 19, 1886
- Long title: An Act to provide for the performance of the duties of the office of President in case of the removal, death, resignation, or inability both of the President and Vice-President.
- Enacted by: the 49th United States Congress
- Effective: January 19, 1886

Citations
- Public law: Chapter 4
- Statutes at Large: 24 Stat. 1

Codification
- Acts amended: Presidential Succession Act of 1792

Legislative history
- Introduced in the Senate as S. 471 by R‑MA George Frisbie Hoarth on December 14, 1885; Committee consideration by Senate Committee on the Judiciary; Passed the Senate on December 17, 1885 (Voice vote); Passed the House on January 15, 1886 (185–88); Signed into law by President Grover Cleveland on January 19, 1886

The death of President James A. Garfield on September 19, 1881—after his lengthy incapacity following an assassination attempt—resulted in Vice President Chester A. Arthur ascending to the presidency. Upon Arthur becoming president, the offices of vice president, president pro tempore of the Senate, and speaker of the House of Representatives were vacant.

However, a new president pro tempore of the Senate was named on October 10, 1881, and a new speaker of the House of Representatives was named in December 1881.

In 1884, Grover Cleveland was elected president, with Thomas A. Hendricks being elected vice president. Hendricks' death in November 1885, just eight months into his term, once again left no direct successor, which forced Congress to address the inadequacies of the 1792 Succession Act.

A bill to transfer the succession from congressional officers to members of the Cabinet was introduced in the Senate by George Hoar in 1882. It was passed by the Senate the following year, but failed in the House. Hoar laid out several reasons why the succession statute needed to be changed: among them, that the four-year term of a president elected in a special election might be out of sync with the congressional election cycle, resulting in "confusion and trouble". He also pointed out the negative constitutional and practical implications of having the president pro tempore and the speaker in the line of succession. To buttress this argument, he pointed out that since the federal government began operations 96 years earlier in 1789, six secretaries of state had gone on to be elected president, serving in that office for 36 of those 96 years. (Note: The six secretaries of state who had become president were: Thomas Jefferson, James Madison, James Monroe, John Q. Adams, Martin Van Buren and James Buchanan. John Tyler was the only president pro tempore to become president, and James K. Polk the only Speaker.) Reintroduced shortly after the death of Vice President Hendricks, Senator Hoar's bill was passed by the Senate after vigorous debate, in December 1885, and by the House one month later. It became law on January 19, 1886, with President Cleveland's signature.

The Presidential Succession Act of 1886 substituted the Cabinet secretaries—listed in the order in which their department was created—for the president pro tempore and speaker in the line of succession. It provided that in case of the removal, death, resignation or inability of both the president and vice president, such officer would "act as President until the disability of the President or Vice-President is removed or a President shall be elected."

It mandated that if Congress were not then in session nor due to meet within twenty days, the acting president was to call a special session of Congress, giving no less than twenty days' notice. It also stipulated that for a member of the Cabinet to act as president, he had to have been appointed by and with the advice and consent of the Senate and be eligible to the office of president, and not under impeachment. This last provision also repealed the 1792 Act's provision for a double-vacancy special election.

=== Potential implementation ===
While it never became necessary to invoke the 1886 Act, the vice presidency was vacant at the time of its adoption, and would become vacant five more times during the 61 years that it was in effect:

- November 21, 1899 – March 4, 1901 (1 year, 103 days) following the death of Garret Hobart.
- September 14, 1901 – March 4, 1905 (3 years, 171 days) following the accession of Theodore Roosevelt to the presidency.
- October 30, 1912 – March 4, 1913 (125 days) following the death of James S. Sherman.
- August 2, 1923 – March 4, 1925 (1 year, 214 days) following the accession of Calvin Coolidge to the presidency.
- April 12, 1945 – January 20, 1949 (3 years, 283 days) following the accession of Harry S. Truman to the presidency.

Had the president died, resigned, been removed from office or been disabled during one of these vacancies, the secretary of state would have become the acting president. Although such circumstances never arose, President Woodrow Wilson apparently drew up a plan (given the turmoil of World War I) whereby, if his Republican opponent Charles Evans Hughes had won the 1916 election, then Wilson would have dismissed his secretary of state, Robert Lansing, and recess-appointed Hughes to the post before Wilson and Vice President Thomas R. Marshall both resigned, thus allowing President-elect Hughes to serve as acting president until his March 4, 1917 inauguration. Wilson's narrow victory over Hughes rendered the plan moot.

Also of note is that 1940 Republican presidential nominee Wendell Willkie and vice presidential nominee Charles L. McNary both died in 1944 (October 8 and February 25, respectively), the first (and as of 2026 only) time both members of a major-party presidential ticket died during the term for which they sought election. Had they been elected, Willkie's death would have resulted in the secretary of state becoming acting president for the remainder of the term ending on January 20, 1945.

== Presidential Succession Act of 1947 ==
Presidential Succession Act of 1947
- Long title: An Act To provide for the performance of the duties of the office of President in case of the removal, resignation, death, or inability both of the President and Vice President.
- Enacted by: the 80th United States Congress
- Effective: July 18, 1947

Citations
- Public law: Pub. L. 80–199
- Statutes at Large: 61 Stat. 380

Codification
- Acts repealed: Presidential Succession Act of 1886 (Pub. L. 49–4, Session 1; 24 Stat. 1)
- Titles amended: U.S. Code: Title 3 – The President
- U.S.C. sections created: § 24; now 3 U.S.C. § 19 by Act of Congress June 25, 1948 (62 Stat. 672)
- U.S.C. sections amended: §§ 21 and 22 (1940 edition)

Legislative history
- Introduced in the Senate as S. 564 by Kenneth S. Wherry (R–NE); Passed the Senate on June 27, 1947 (50 to 35); Passed the House on July 10, 1947 (365 to 11); Signed into law by President Harry S. Truman on July 18, 1947

Major amendments
- Modifications to § 19 (d)(1): Pub. L. 80–253, § 311; 61 Stat. 509 (1947); Pub. L. 89–174, § 6(a); 79 Stat. 669 (1965); Pub. L. 89–670, § 10(a); 80 Stat. 948 (1966); Pub. L. 91–375 § 6(b); 84 Stat. 775 (1970); Pub. L. 95–91, title VII, § 709(g); 91 Stat. 609 (1977); Pub. L. 96–88, title V, § 508(a); 93 Stat. 692 (1979); Pub. L. 100–527, § 13(a); 102 Stat. 2643 (1988); Pub. L. 109–177 (text) (PDF), title V, § 503; 120 Stat. 247 (2006)

In June 1945, two months after becoming president upon Franklin D. Roosevelt's death, Harry S. Truman sent a message to Congress urging the revision of the Presidential Succession Act of 1886. He recommended that the speaker of the House and president pro tempore of the Senate be restored to, and given priority in, the presidential line of succession over members of the Cabinet. The arrangement reflected Truman's belief that the president should not have the power to appoint to office "the person who would be my immediate successor in the event of my own death or inability to act", and that the presidency should, whenever possible, "be filled by an elective officer". Cabinet officials are appointed by the president, whereas the speaker and the president pro tempore are elected officials. (Note: "When President Roosevelt died in office, April 12, 1945, and was succeeded by Vice President Truman, the man next in line of succession to the presidency was Edward R. Stettinius, Jr., then Secretary of State. Next after Stettinius came Henry Morgenthau, Jr., then Secretary of the Treasury. Neither had ever held an elective office; neither commanded any considerable following among the people. This was the situation when President Truman sent a special message to Congress, June 19, urging early revision of the Presidential Succession Act of 1886 'in the interest of orderly, democratic government'.") He also recommended that a provision be made for election of a new president and vice president should vacancies in both of those offices occur more than three months before the midterm congressional elections.

A bill incorporating the president's proposal was introduced in the House on June 25, 1945, by Hatton W. Sumners and approved—minus the special election provision—four days later by a wide margin. The measure was forwarded to the Senate, which took no action on it during the balance of the 79th Congress. Truman renewed his request in 1947, when the 80th Congress convened following the 1946 midterm elections. Early in 1947, Senator Kenneth S. Wherry introduced a bill in the Senate which, like the previous 1945 version, put the speaker and the president pro tempore second and third in the succession order respectively, and contained no provision for a special election. After considerable debate the measure was approved on June 27, 1947, by a vote of 50 to 35. Forwarded to the House, the legislation engendered little debate, and was passed on July 10 by a vote of 365 to 11. President Truman signed the bill into law on July 18.

The Presidential Succession Act of 1947 restored the speaker of the House and president pro tempore of the Senate to the line of succession—in reverse order from their positions in the 1792 act—and placed them ahead of the members of the Cabinet, who are positioned once more in the order of the establishment of their department: secretary of state, secretary of the treasury, secretary of war, attorney general, postmaster general, secretary of the navy, and secretary of the interior. Three Cabinet secretaries were added to the lineup, reflecting the creation of three Cabinet-level departments post-1886: secretary of agriculture, secretary of commerce, and secretary of labor. The act stipulates, that in order for either the speaker or the president pro tempore to become acting president, he or she must meet the requirements for presidential eligibility, and must, prior to acting as president, resign from office, including from Congress.

Like the 1886 act, this statute specifies that only Cabinet members who are constitutionally eligible to the office of president, and not under impeachment by the House at the time the powers and duties of the presidency devolve upon them, may become the acting president. However, unlike the 1886 act, this statute mandates that any Cabinet officer who accedes to the powers and duties of the presidency resign their Cabinet post. It also contains a clause stipulating that any Cabinet officer acting as president may be "bumped" from office (supplanted) by a qualified individual higher up the line of succession, a provision not contained in either of the earlier succession acts.

The 1886 and 1947 acts diverge in one other way. The 1886 act describes "such officers as shall have been appointed by the advice and consent of the Senate to the offices therein named" as being eligible to serve as acting president, whereas the 1947 act describes "officers appointed, by and with the advice and consent of the Senate" as being eligible. The less explicit 1947 language raises the question of whether acting secretaries are in the line of succession. The nonpartisan Continuity of Government Commission, in a 2009 report, said "[r]ead literally, this means that the current act allows for acting secretaries to be in the line of succession as long as they are confirmed by the Senate for a post (even for example, the second or third in command within a department)." Although a case for their inclusion can be made, it is not clear whether acting secretaries are indeed in the line of succession.

The 1947 act established that a person who becomes an acting president under the act will earn the same compensation given to the president. Additionally, based on authority granted by Section 3 of the Twentieth Amendment, the act applies to situations where the president-elect, alone or together with the vice president-elect, fails to meet the qualifications for the office of president. Based on that same authority, the act also applies to situations in which there is neither a president-elect nor a vice president-elect on Inauguration Day.

=== Revisions ===
The 1947 act has been modified by a series of incidental amendments to reflect the creation of new federal departments. Less than two weeks after the Act was enacted, Truman signed the National Security Act of 1947 into law. This statute (in part) merged the Department of War (renamed as the Department of the Army) and the Department of the Navy into the National Military Establishment (renamed Department of Defense in 1949), headed by the secretary of defense. It also included a provision substituting the secretary of defense for the secretary of war in the line of succession and striking out the secretary of the navy.

In 1953, a new Cabinet department was created; this led to the creation of a new position behind the secretary of labor in the line of succession: the secretary of health, education and welfare. In 1965, another new Cabinet department was created; the secretary of housing and urban development joined the line of succession. The secretary of transportation was added the following year. In 1970 and 1977, respectively, the postmaster general was removed as a result of the Postal Reorganization Act, and the secretary of energy was inserted at the end of the list. In 1979, when the Department of Health, Education, and Welfare was divided by the Department of Education Organization Act, its secretary was replaced in the order of succession by the secretary of health and human services, and the new secretary of education was added in the last position. In 1988 and 2006, respectively, the secretary of veterans affairs and then the secretary of homeland security were added, becoming the 16th and 17th statutory successors (including the vice president) to the powers and duties of the presidency.

When the Department of Homeland Security was created in 2002, the act creating it did not contain a provision adding the new department's secretary into the line of presidential succession. Secretaries of newly created cabinet-level departments are not automatically included, but must be specifically incorporated. Companion bills to include the secretary of homeland security (SHS) in the line of succession were introduced in the 108th Congress (in 2003) and again in the 109th (in 2005) by Senator Mike DeWine and Representative Tom Davis. Both bills strayed from tradition, however, by proposing to place the SHS in the line of succession directly after the attorney general (rather than at the end of the line). Proponents of placing the SHS high in the order of succession (eighth overall, as opposed to seventeenth) argued that, given the department's many responsibilities in the areas of security and national preparedness, the officer responsible for disaster relief and security could be expected to possess the relevant knowledge and expertise to capably function as acting president following a catastrophic event; the same could not be said of every cabinet secretary. Referred to committee, no action was taken on these proposals. The matter remained unresolved until March 2006, when the USA PATRIOT Improvement and Reauthorization Act added the secretary of homeland security to the presidential line of succession, at the end.

=== Potential invocations ===
While it has not become necessary to invoke the 1947 Act, the vice presidency was vacant at the time of its adoption, and has been vacant three more times since:

- November 22, 1963 – January 20, 1965 (1 year, 59 days) following Lyndon B. Johnson succeeding to the presidency
- October 10, 1973 – December 6, 1973 (57 days) following Spiro Agnew resigning the vice presidency
- August 9, 1974 – December 19, 1974 (132 days) following Gerald Ford succeeding to the presidency

Had the president died, resigned, been removed from office, or been disabled during one of these vacancies the speaker of the House would have become acting president. The nation faced the prospect of such a double-vacancy in the autumn of 1973. With the future of Richard Nixon's presidency in doubt on account of the Watergate scandal, and with the vice presidency vacant following Spiro Agnew's resignation, there was a possibility that Speaker of the House Carl Albert might become acting president. Recourse in this case to the 1947 Act was not necessary, because Section 2 of the Twenty-fifth Amendment, ratified only six years earlier, established a mechanism for filling an intra-term vice presidential vacancy, and House Minority Leader Ford was appointed. As a result, rather than Speaker Albert becoming acting president when Nixon resigned on August 9, 1974, Vice President Ford became president on that date.

The Twenty-fifth Amendment also established a procedure for responding to presidential disabilities whereby a vice president could assume the powers and duties of the presidency as acting president. Its procedures for declaring a temporary disability have been invoked on four occasions by three presidents.

During the September 11, 2001 terrorist attacks, the Secret Service carried out its plan for ensuring the continuity of government, which in part called for gathering up persons in the presidential line of succession and taking them to a secure location, to guarantee that at least one officer in the line of succession would survive the attacks. Speaker of the House Dennis Hastert and several other congressional leaders went; President pro tempore of the Senate Robert Byrd did not, choosing instead to be taken to his Capitol Hill home. Vice President Dick Cheney and Secretary of Transportation Norman Mineta went into an underground bunker at the White House; a few Cabinet members were out of the country that day.

=== Designated successor ===
There is a long history, dating back to the Cold War era, of keeping a designated successor away from events at which numerous high-ranking federal officers—including the president, vice president, congressional leaders, and Cabinet members—will be gathered. This is done to ensure that there is always someone available to assume the reins of government if all the other officers are killed at the event. For example, Secretary of Agriculture Sonny Perdue was the Cabinet member so designated when President Donald Trump delivered his 2018 State of the Union Address. Perdue was taken to a secure location several hours beforehand, and remained there throughout the event. Although any cabinet secretary could be selected, the person appointed has usually come from one of the newer departments low in the line of succession. The person chosen must also meet the constitutional requirements to serve as president.

=== Constitutionality ===
The 1947 act has been widely criticized over the years as unconstitutional. Akhil Amar, who is a legal scholar in constitutional law, has called it "a disastrous statute, an accident waiting to happen". There are two main areas of concern.

==== Meaning of "officer" ====
There are concerns regarding the constitutionality of having members of Congress in the line of succession. The Constitution's Succession Clause—Article II, Section 1, Clause 6—specifies that only an "Officer" may be designated as a presidential successor. Constitutional scholars from James Madison to the present day have argued that the term "Officer" refers to an "Officer of the United States", a term of art that excludes members of Congress. During a September 2003 joint hearing before the U.S. Senate's Committee on Rules and Administration and Committee on the Judiciary, M. Miller Baker said:

The 1947 Act is probably unconstitutional because it appears that the Speaker of the House and the President pro tempore of the Senate are not "Officers" eligible to act as President within the meaning of the Succession Clause. This is because in referring to an "Officer", the Succession Clause, taken in its context in Section 1 of Article II, probably refers to an "Officer of the United States", a term of art under the Constitution, rather than any officer, which would include legislative and state officers referred to in the Constitution (e.g., the reference to state militia officers found in Article I, Section 8). In the very next section of Article II, the President is empowered to "require the Opinion, in writing, of the principal Officer in each of the executive Departments" and to appoint, by and with the advice and consent of the Senate, "Officers of the United States". These are the "Officers" to whom the Succession Clause probably refers. This contextual reading is confirmed by Madison's notes from the Constitutional Convention, which reveal that the Convention's Committee of Style, which had no authority to make substantive changes, substituted "Officer" in the Succession Clause in place of "Officer of the United States", probably because the Committee considered the full phrase redundant.

In "Is the Presidential Succession Law Constitutional?", Akhil Amar and Vikram Amar refer to the Incompatibility Clause (Article I, Section 6, Clause 2)—which bars officials in the federal government's executive branch from simultaneously serving in either the U.S. House or Senate—as evidence that members of the Congress cannot be in the Presidential line of succession.

==== Bumping ====
The current act is also controversial because it provides that an officer who is acting as president due to the disability or failure to qualify of an officer higher in the order of succession does so only until the other officer's disability or disqualification is removed. If this happens, the previously entitled officer can "bump" the person then acting as president. During testimony in 2004 before the United States House Judiciary Subcommittee on the Constitution and Civil Justice, Akhil Reed Amar stated that this provision violates "the Succession Clause, which says that an officer named by Congress shall 'act as President ... until the Disability be removed, or a President shall be elected'".

In its 2009 report, the Continuity of Government Commission argued that as well as going against the language of the Constitution, bumping violates the doctrine of separation of powers by undermining the independence of the executive from the Congress:

The Constitution on its face seems to stipulate that once a person is deemed to be acting president by the Presidential Succession Act, he or she cannot be replaced by a different person. This interpretation makes some logical sense as the provision would presumably prevent the confusion that would arise if the presidency were transferred to several different individuals in a short period of time. It would also seemingly prevent Congress from exercising influence on the executive branch by threatening to replace a cabinet member acting as president with a newly elected Speaker of the House.

On a practical level, it has been argued that this provision could result in there being multiple acting presidents in a short period of time during a national crisis and weaken the public legitimacy of successors. In a January 2011 Roll Call op-ed, Representative Brad Sherman wrote,

[The bumping provision] creates a game of musical chairs with the presidency and would cause great instability. In a time of national crisis, the nation needs to know who its president is.

== Table of statutory successors ==
Statutory presidential successors
Succession Act of 1792	Succession Act of 1886	Succession Act of 1947 (as amended)
• President pro tempore of the Senate • Speaker of the House	• Secretary of State • Secretary of the Treasury • Secretary of War • Attorney General • Postmaster General • Secretary of the Navy • Secretary of the Interior	• Speaker of the House • President pro tempore of the Senate • Secretary of State • Secretary of the Treasury • Secretary of War, 1947 → Secretary of Defense • Attorney General • Postmaster General, 1947–1970 • Secretary of the Navy, 1947 • Secretary of the Interior • Secretary of Agriculture • Secretary of Commerce • Secretary of Labor • Secretary of Health, Education, and Welfare, 1965–1979 → Secretary of Health and Human Services • Secretary of Housing and Urban Development, since 1965 • Secretary of Transportation, since 1966 • Secretary of Energy, since 1977 • Secretary of Education, since 1979 • Secretary of Veterans Affairs, since 1988 • Secretary of Homeland Security, since 2006
