= Twelfth Amendment to the United States Constitution =

1804 amendment regulating presidential elections

The Twelfth Amendment (Amendment XII) to the United States Constitution provides the procedure for electing the president and vice president. It replaced the procedure in Article II, Section 1, Clause 3, under which the Electoral College originally functioned. The amendment was proposed by Congress on December 9, 1803, and was ratified by the requisite three-quarters of state legislatures on June 15, 1804. The new rules took effect for the 1804 presidential election and have governed all subsequent presidential elections.

Initially under the Constitution, each member of the Electoral College cast two electoral votes, with no distinction between electoral votes for president or for vice president. The presidential candidate receiving the greatest number of votes—provided that number was at least a majority of the electors—was elected president, while the presidential candidate receiving the second-most votes was elected vice president. In cases where no individual won the votes of a majority of the electors, as well as in cases where multiple persons won the votes of a majority but tied for the most votes, the House of Representatives would hold a contingent election to select the president. In cases where multiple candidates tied for the second-most votes, the Senate would hold a contingent election to select the vice president. The first four presidential elections were conducted under these rules.

The original system allowed the 1796 and 1800 presidential elections to elect a president and vice-president who were political opponents, constantly acting at cross-purposes. This was the case as John Adams (Federalist) had to deal with Thomas Jefferson (Democratic-Republican) as his vice president. There was also the danger of two or more candidates tying in the electoral college. This was the case in 1800 when Jefferson and Aaron Burr, though both Anti-Federalist, were indeed tied in the college. This spurred legislators to amend the presidential election process to require each member of the Electoral College to cast one electoral vote for president and one electoral vote for vice president. Under the new rules, a contingent election is still held by the House of Representatives if no candidate wins the presidential electoral vote of a majority of the electors, but there is no longer any possibility of multiple candidates winning presidential electoral votes from a majority of electors, and it is provided that no individual constitutionally ineligible to the office of president would be eligible to serve as vice president.

== Text ==
The Electors shall meet in their respective states, and vote by ballot for President and Vice-President, one of whom, at least, shall not be an inhabitant of the same state with themselves; they shall name in their ballots the person voted for as President, and in distinct ballots the person voted for as Vice-President, and they shall make distinct lists of all persons voted for as President, and all persons voted for as Vice-President and of the number of votes for each, which lists they shall sign and certify, and transmit sealed to the seat of the government of the United States, directed to the President of the Senate;

The President of the Senate shall, in the presence of the Senate and House of Representatives, open all the certificates and the votes shall then be counted;

The person having the greatest number of votes for President, shall be the President, if such number be a majority of the whole number of Electors appointed; and if no person have such majority, then from the persons having the highest numbers not exceeding three on the list of those voted for as President, the House of Representatives shall choose immediately, by ballot, the President. But in choosing the President, the votes shall be taken by states, the representation from each state having one vote; a quorum for this purpose shall consist of a member or members from two-thirds of the states, and a majority of all the states shall be necessary to a choice. And if the House of Representatives shall not choose a President whenever the right of choice shall devolve upon them, before the fourth day of March next following, then the Vice-President shall act as President, as in the case of the death or other constitutional disability of the President. (Note: (Note: This provision was superseded by Sections 1, 2, and 3 of the Twentieth Amendment in 1933.))

The person having the greatest number of votes as Vice-President, shall be the Vice-President, if such number be a majority of the whole number of Electors appointed, and if no person have a majority, then from the two highest numbers on the list, the Senate shall choose the Vice-President; a quorum for the purpose shall consist of two-thirds of the whole number of Senators, and a majority of the whole number shall be necessary to a choice. But no person constitutionally ineligible to the office of President shall be eligible to that of Vice-President of the United States.

== Background ==
Under the original procedure for the Electoral College, as provided in Article II, Section 1, Clause 3, each elector cast two electoral votes, with no distinction made between electoral votes for president and electoral votes for vice president. The two people chosen by the elector could not both inhabit the same state as that elector. This prohibition was designed to keep electors from voting for two "favorite sons" of their respective states. The person receiving the greatest number of votes, provided that number constituted a majority of the electors, was elected president.

There were two possible scenarios in which the House of Representatives would need to hold a contingent election to select the president. If there were more than one individual who received the same number of votes, and such number equaled a majority of the electors, the House would choose one of them to be president. If no individual had a majority, then the House would choose from the five individuals with the greatest number of electoral votes. In both sets of circumstances, each state delegation had one (en bloc) vote. A candidate was required to receive an absolute majority, more than half of the total number of states, in order to be chosen as president.

Selecting the vice president was a simpler process. Whichever candidate received the second greatest number of votes for president became vice president. The vice president, unlike the president, was not required to receive votes from a majority of the electors. In the event of a tie for second place, the Senate would hold a contingent election to select the vice president from those tied, with each senator casting one vote. A candidate was required to receive an absolute majority, more than half of the total Senate membership, in order to be chosen as vice president.

The original electoral system worked adequately for the first two presidential elections because on both occasions George Washington was the unanimous choice of the electors for president; the only real contest was the election for vice president for which an overall majority was not required. George Washington's decision not to seek a third term and the emergence of partisan political activity exposed problems with the original procedure.

In the 1796 election, John Adams, the Federalist Party presidential candidate, received votes from a majority of electors. However, the Federalist electors scattered their second votes, resulting in the Democratic–Republican Party presidential candidate, Thomas Jefferson, receiving the second highest number of electoral votes and thus being elected vice president. It soon became apparent that having a vice president and a president unwilling to work together effectively was going to be a more significant problem than was originally realized. The most significant problem was that with the French Revolutionary Wars raging in Europe, it was immediately apparent that President Adams was going to pursue a pro-British foreign policy, much to the disgust of the strongly pro-French Vice President Jefferson.

On January 6, 1797, Federalist Representative William L. Smith of South Carolina responded to the 1796 result by presenting a resolution on the floor of the House of Representatives for an amendment to the Constitution requiring each elector to cast one vote for president and another for vice president. However, no action was taken on his proposal.

This set the stage for a crisis. In the 1800 election, both major parties attempted to prevent the problem that arose in 1796 by nominating separate presidential and vice presidential candidates on a party ticket. However, there was no way for the electors to distinguish between the two offices when they cast their votes, so if all the electors voted for their party tickets, the election would end in a tie between the two candidates from the most popular ticket.

The Democratic-Republicans, who had nominated Jefferson for president and Aaron Burr for vice president, managed to secure a majority of pledged electors. But the electoral margin was so slim that there was little room for error if the Democratic–Republicans were to avoid repeating the Federalists' miscues of 1796. Given the technical limitations of 18th-century communications, Democratic–Republican electors in each state were left to assume that an elector in some other state was the one responsible for casting the one abstention necessary to ensure the election of Burr to the vice presidency. In the event, all the Democratic–Republicans electors were so reluctant to be responsible for causing outgoing President Adams to be elected as vice president that every Democratic–Republican elector cast a vote for both Jefferson and Burr, resulting in a tie. This problem was termed later the Burr dilemma.

Consequently, a contingent presidential election was held in the House of Representatives. Federalist-controlled state delegations cast their votes for Burr in an effort to prevent Jefferson from becoming president. Neither Burr nor Jefferson was able to win on the first 35 ballots. With help from Alexander Hamilton, the gridlock was finally broken on the 36th ballot and Jefferson was elected president on February 17, 1801. This prolonged contingent election, combined with the increasing Democratic–Republican majorities in both the House and the Senate, set the stage for a constitutional amendment to alter this flawed system.

== Adoption ==
=== Journey to Congress ===
In March 1801, weeks after the election of 1800 was resolved, two amendments were proposed in the New York State Legislature that would form the skeleton of the Twelfth Amendment. Governor John Jay submitted an amendment to the state legislature that would require a district election of electors in each state. Assemblyman Jedediah Peck submitted an amendment to adopt designations for the votes for president and vice president. The two amendments were not considered until early 1802 because the state legislature took a break for the summer and winter. New York state senator DeWitt Clinton moved for the adoption of the amendment in January 1802. Shortly thereafter, Clinton won a vacant seat in the U.S. Senate, where he was instrumental in bringing the designation amendment to Congress. The process continued in New York on February 15 when Representative Benjamin Walker of New York proposed the designation and district election amendments to the House. Debate on the amendments began in May. The Democratic-Republicans wanted to decide on the amendment quickly, but the Federalists argued that the ideas needed more time than the current session allowed. Federalist Samuel W. Dana of Connecticut wanted to examine the necessity of a vice president. The amendment ultimately failed in the New York State Senate, but DeWitt Clinton brought the amendment discussion to the House of Representatives.

The Democratic–Republican majority decided to wait for the 8th Congress to debate the amendment as this would allow them a better chance of meeting the two-thirds votes requirement for needed to adopt a resolution for a proposed Constitutional amendment.

=== Congressional debate ===
==== House of Representatives ====
In 1803, on its first day, the 8th Congress considered the designation amendment. The first formulation of the amendment had the five highest electoral vote earners on the ballot in the House if no one candidate had a majority of the electoral votes. Democratic–Republican John Clopton of Virginia, the largest state in the Union, argued that having five names on the list for a contingency election took the power from the people, so he proposed that there be only two names on the list. On October 20, the House appointed a seventeen-member committee (one Representative from each state) to fine-tune the amendment.

The original proposal starting in the New York State Legislature would have, along with designation, put forward the idea of the district election of electors that Treasury Secretary Gallatin had supported. Shortly after the committee was formed, Federalist Benjamin Huger attempted to add a provision regarding district elections to the proposed amendment, but the committee ignored him.

The committee then submitted an updated version of the designation amendment to the House on October 23 that changed the number of candidates in a contingency election from five to three and allowed the Senate to choose the vice president if there were a tie in that race. Small Federalist states disliked the change from five to three because it made it far less likely that a small-state candidate would make it to a contingency election. Huger and New York Federalist Gaylord Griswold argued that the Constitution was a compromise between large and small states and the method chosen by the Framers is supposed to check the influence of the larger states. Huger even asserted that the Constitution itself was not a union of people, but a union of large and small states in order to justify the original framework for electing the president. Designation, argued Griswold and Huger, would violate the spirit of the Constitution by taking away a check on the power of the large states.

Next up for the Federalists was Seth Hastings of Massachusetts, who submitted the argument that the designation amendment rendered the vice presidency useless and advocated the elimination of the three-fifths clause. John C. Smith asked the inflammatory question of whether the proposed amendment was to help Jefferson get reelected. Speaker Nathaniel Macon called this inappropriate. Matthew Lyon of Kentucky denounced any reference to the three-fifths clause as mere provocation. The House proceeded to pass the resolution 88–31 on October 28, 1803.

Many Northern representatives argued for the elimination of the electoral college, and argued for direct election of the President by all U.S. voters.

==== Senate ====
By October 28, the Senate had already been discussing the designation amendment. Democratic–Republican DeWitt Clinton expected that the Senate, with a 24–9 Democratic–Republican majority would quickly pass the amendment. Federalist Jonathan Dayton proposed that the office of the vice president should be eliminated and his colleague, Uriah Tracy, seconded it. On the other side, Wilson Cary Nicholas was simply worried that Congress would not submit the amendment in time for the states to ratify it before the 1804 election. Despite Nicholas' concern, the Senate would not seriously deal with the amendment again until November 23.

Much as it had in the House, debate centered on the number of candidates in a contingency election and the philosophical underpinnings of the Constitution. Again, small Federalist states vehemently argued that three candidates gave too much power to large states to pick presidents. Senator Pierce Butler of South Carolina argued that the issues with the election of 1800 were unlikely to happen again and he would not advocate changing the Constitution simply to stop a Federalist vice president. John Quincy Adams argued that the change from five to three gave an advantage to the people that violated the federative principle of the Constitution. Rather than have the office of the president balanced between the states and the people, Adams felt designation of president and vice president would tip that scale in favor of the people.

Federalist senators argued for retaining the original procedure for the Electoral College. Senator Samuel White of Delaware claimed that the original procedure had not been given "a fair experiment" and criticized the proposed amendment for entrenching the two-party system which had taken over presidential elections.

In response, the Democratic–Republicans appealed to democratic principles. Samuel Smith of Maryland argued that the presidency ought to be as closely accountable to the people as possible. As such, having three candidates in a contingency election is far better than having five, because it would otherwise be possible to have the fifth best candidate become president. Also, designation itself would drastically cut down the number of elections that would reach the House of Representatives, and the president is then much more likely to be the people's choice. Another of Smith's arguments was simply the election of 1800. William Cocke of Tennessee took a different approach when he argued that the entire small state argument of the Federalists was simply out of self-interest.

One last order of business for the amendment was to deal with the possibility that the House would fail to choose a president by March 4. It was the least controversial portion of the Twelfth Amendment and John Taylor proposed that the vice president would take over as president in that peculiar occurrence, "as in case of the death or other Constitutional disability of the President".

It seemed clear all along that the Democratic–Republican dominance would render this a no-contest and the Democratic–Republicans were just waiting for all their votes to be present, but the Federalists had one last defense. A marathon session of debate from 11:00 a.m. to 10:00 p.m. was the order of the day on December 2, 1803. Most notably, Uriah Tracy of Connecticut argued in a similar vein as Adams when he invoked the federative principle of the Constitution. Tracy claimed the original procedure was formulated to give the small states a chance to elect the vice president, who would be a check on the president's powers. In essence, the states balanced the power of the people. However, this works only if you make it partisan, as Georgia (for example) was a Democratic–Republican small state.

=== Proposal and ratification ===
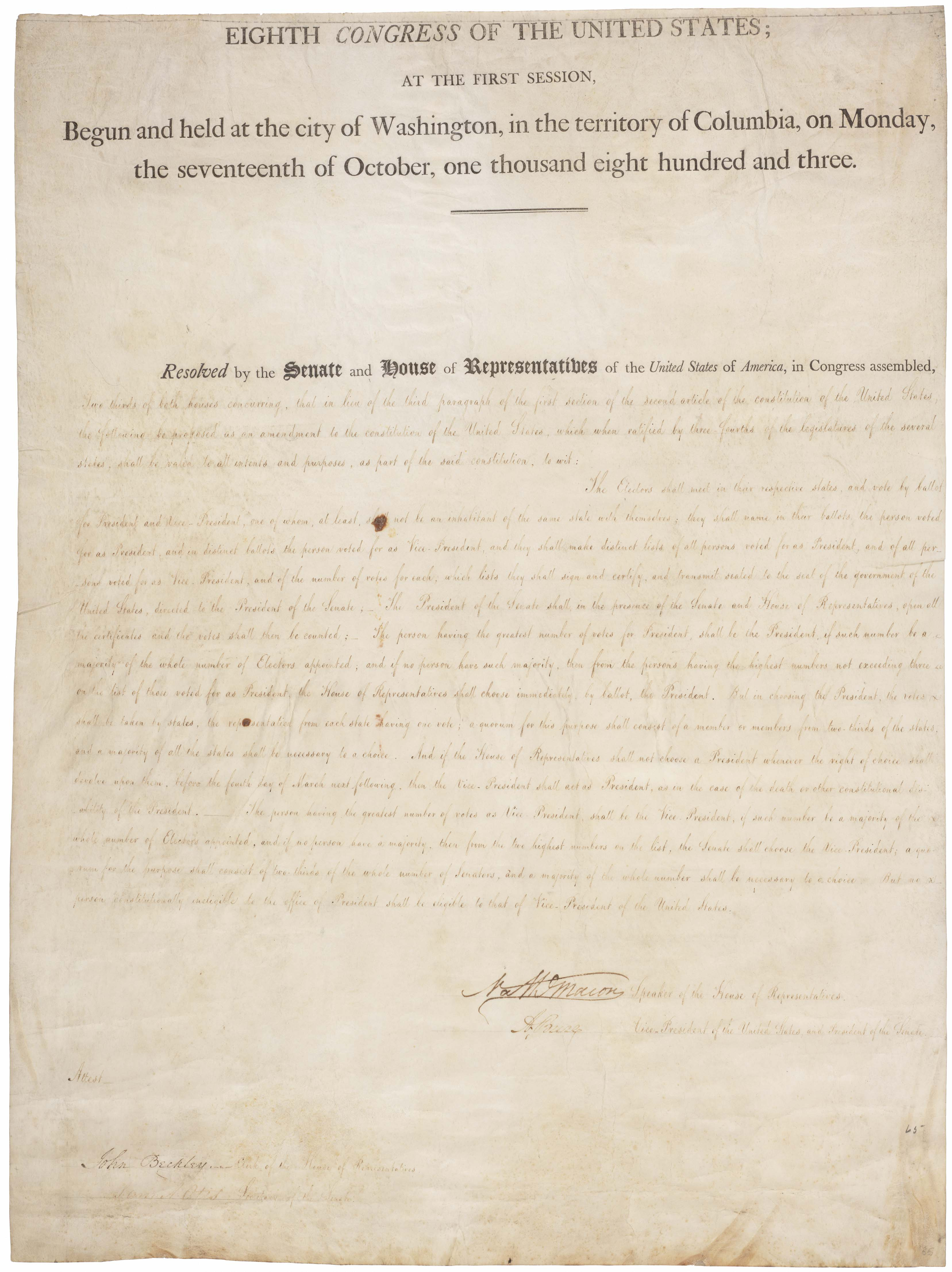
The Twelfth Amendment in the National Archives

The Twelfth Amendment was proposed by the 8th Congress on December 9, 1803, when it was approved by the House of Representatives by vote of 84–42, having been previously passed by the Senate, 22–10, on December 2. The amendment was officially submitted to the 17 states on December 12, 1803, and was ratified by the legislatures of the following states:

1. North Carolina: December 22, 1803
2. Maryland: December 24, 1803
3. Kentucky: December 27, 1803
4. Ohio: December 30, 1803
5. Pennsylvania: January 5, 1804
6. Vermont: January 30, 1804
7. Virginia: February 3, 1804
8. New York: February 10, 1804
9. New Jersey: February 22, 1804
10. Rhode Island: March 12, 1804
11. South Carolina: May 15, 1804
12. Georgia: May 19, 1804
13. New Hampshire: June 15, 1804
  Having been ratified by the legislatures of three-fourths of the several states (13 of 17), the ratification of the Twelfth Amendment was completed and it became a part of the Constitution. (Note: Ratification was probably completed on June 15, 1804, when the New Hampshire legislature ratified the amendment. However, the state's governor, John Taylor Gilman, vetoed the resolution of ratification on June 20, and the act failed to pass again by the two-thirds vote then required by the state constitution. Nevertheless, considering that the ratification prescribed by Article V of the Constitution specifies that amendments shall become effective "when ratified by the legislatures of three-fourths of the several States or by conventions in three-fourths thereof", it has been generally believed that an approval or veto by a governor is without legal effect.) It was subsequently ratified by:
14. Tennessee: July 27, 1804
15. Massachusetts: 1961 (Note: After having been rejected by the Massachusetts legislature on February 3, 1804.)

The amendment was rejected by Delaware, on January 18, 1804, and by Connecticut, on May 10, 1804. In a September 25, 1804, circular letter to the governors of the states, Secretary of State James Madison declared the amendment ratified by three-fourths of the states.

== Electoral College under the Twelfth Amendment ==
While the Twelfth Amendment did not change the composition of the Electoral College, it did change the process whereby a president and a vice president are elected. The new electoral process was first used for the 1804 election. Each presidential election since has been conducted under the terms of the Twelfth Amendment.

The Twelfth Amendment stipulates that each elector must cast distinct votes for president and vice president, instead of two votes for president. The amendment adapts the provision from the original Article II text that forbids an elector from casting both their presidential votes for inhabitants of their own state; under the Twelfth Amendment, one of the votes an elector casts—either their vote for president or their vote for vice-president—must be for someone who resides in a state other than the one where that elector lives. The upshot of this rule is that presidential candidates have refrained from selecting a running mate who lives in the same state that they do, lest they risk losing either the presidential or vice presidential votes from electors from their shared home state. For instance, at the beginning of 2000, Dick Cheney and George W. Bush were both legally residents of Texas; but, in preparation for being nominated as Bush's running mate, Cheney changed his legal residence to Wyoming, where he owned a home and which he had previously represented in Congress.

If no candidate for president has a majority of the total votes, the House of Representatives, voting by states and with the same quorum requirements as under the original procedure, chooses the president. This is the only proceeding in which the House votes by state delegation. The Twelfth Amendment requires the House to choose from the three highest receivers of electoral votes, compared to five under the original procedure.

The Twelfth Amendment requires a person to receive a majority of the electoral votes for vice president for that person to be elected vice president by the Electoral College. If no candidate for vice president has a majority of the total votes, the Senate, with each senator having one vote, chooses the vice president. The Twelfth Amendment requires the Senate to choose between the candidates with the "two highest numbers" of electoral votes. If multiple individuals are tied for second place, the Senate may consider them all. The Twelfth Amendment introduced a quorum requirement of two-thirds of the whole number of senators for the conduct of balloting. Furthermore, the Twelfth Amendment requires the Senate to choose a vice president by way of the affirmative votes of "a majority of the whole number" of senators.

To prevent deadlocks from keeping the nation leaderless, the Twelfth Amendment provided that if the House did not choose a president before March 4 (then the first day of a presidential term), the individual elected vice president would "act as President, as in the case of the death or other constitutional disability of the President". The Twelfth Amendment did not state for how long the vice president would act as president or if the House could still choose a president after March 4. Section 3 of the Twentieth Amendment, adopted in 1933, supersedes that provision of the Twelfth Amendment by changing the date upon which a new presidential term commences to January 20, clarifying that the vice president-elect would only "act as President" if the House has not chosen a president by January 20, and permitting Congress to statutorily provide "who shall then act as President, or the manner in which one who is to act shall be selected" if there is no president-elect or vice president-elect by January 20. It also clarifies that if there is no president-elect on January 20, whoever acts as president does so until a person "qualified" to occupy the presidency is elected to be president.

=== Interaction with the Twenty-second Amendment ===
The Twelfth Amendment explicitly states the constitutional requirements as provided for the president also apply to being vice president and the Twenty-second Amendment bars a two-term president from being elected to a third term, but it is unexplicit whether these amendments together bar any two-term president from later serving as vice president as well as from succeeding to the presidency from any point in the United States presidential line of succession. Some contend that the Twelfth Amendment concerns qualification for service, while the Twenty-second Amendment concerns qualifications for election, and thus a former two-term president is still eligible to serve as vice president. Some legal scholars propose the contention above would inadequately consider the opportunity it affords for one to serve as president more than two terms plus "[acting] as President, for more than two years," resulting in a violation of the Twenty-second Amendment.

The interaction between the two amendments has not been tested, as no twice-elected president has ever been nominated for the vice presidency. However, in striking down term limits imposed by state governments on members of Congress in U.S. Term Limits, Inc. v. Thornton (1995), the Supreme Court held that term limits amount to a qualification for holding public office referencing the 22nd Amendment, stating that "the Nation as a whole... has imposed a limit on the number of terms that the President may serve. Term limits, like any other qualification for office, unquestionably restrict the ability of voters to vote for whom they wish."

Hillary Clinton jokingly said during her 2016 presidential campaign that she had considered naming her husband, twice-elected former president Bill Clinton as her vice presidential running mate, but had been advised it would be unconstitutional. This constitutional ambiguity allowed for speculation in 2020 about whether twice-elected former president Barack Obama was eligible to be vice president.

== Elections since 1804 ==
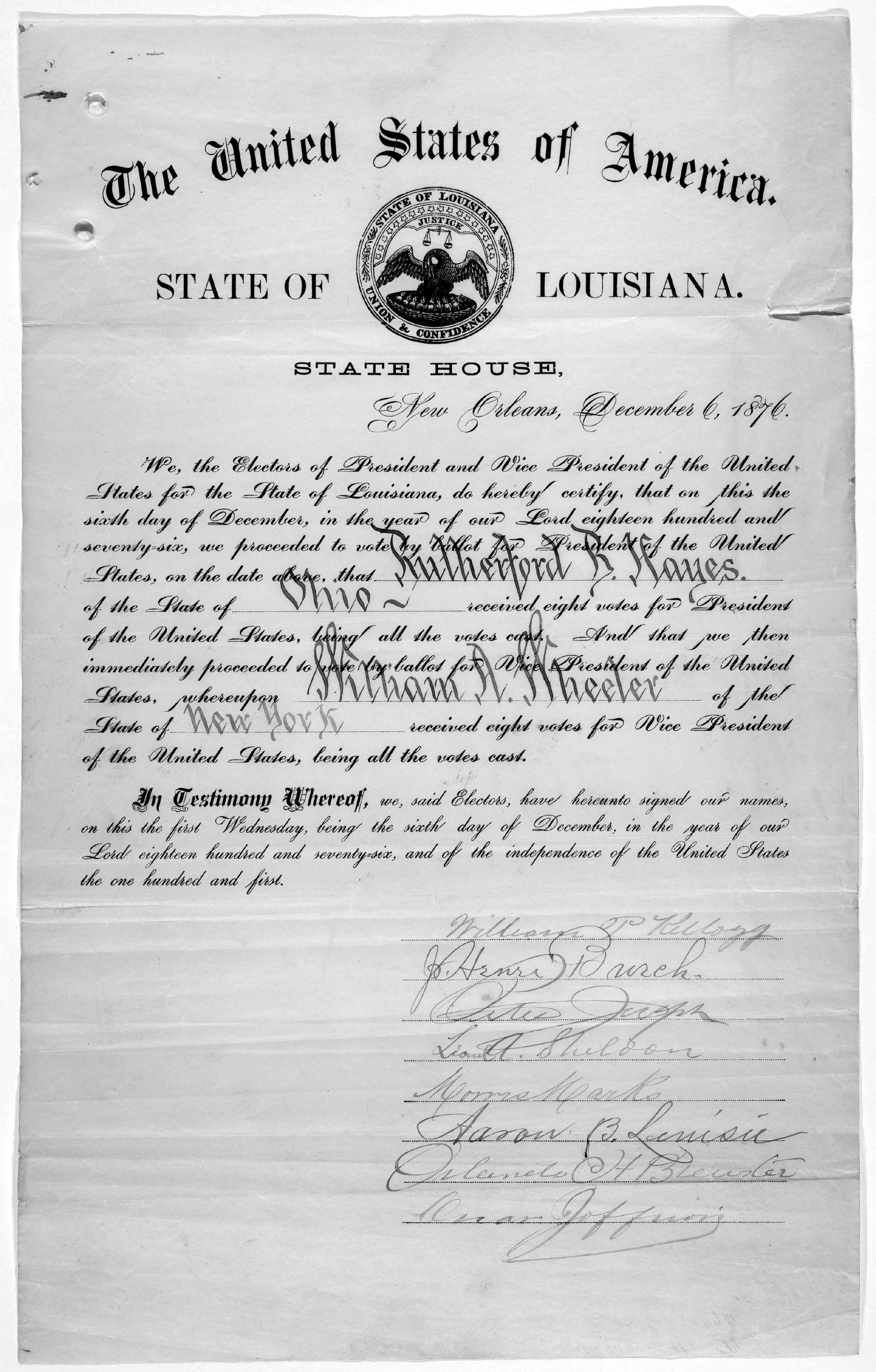
Certificate for the electoral vote for Rutherford B. Hayes and William A. Wheeler for the State of Louisiana

Starting with the election of 1804, each presidential election has been conducted under the Twelfth Amendment. Only once since then has the House of Representatives chosen the president in a contingent election, in the 1824 election as none of the four candidates won an absolute majority (131 votes required at the time) of electoral votes: Andrew Jackson received 99 electoral votes, John Quincy Adams (son of John Adams) 84, William H. Crawford 41, and Henry Clay 37.

As the House could consider only the top three candidates, Clay was eliminated, while Crawford's poor health following a paralytic stroke made his election by the House unlikely.

Jackson expected the House to vote for him, as he had won a plurality of both the popular (Note: Six states at that time chose their electors in the state legislature rather than by popular vote and so did not keep a count of votes for president.) and electoral votes. Instead, the House elected Adams on the first ballot with thirteen states, followed by Jackson with seven and Crawford with four. Clay had endorsed Adams for the presidency, which carried additional weight because Clay was the Speaker of the House. Adams subsequently appointed Clay as his Secretary of State, to which Jackson and his supporters responded by accusing the pair of making a "corrupt bargain". In the election for vice president, John C. Calhoun (the running mate of both Jackson and Adams) was elected outright, receiving 182 electoral votes.

In 1836, the Whig Party nominated four different candidates in different regions, aiming to splinter the electoral vote while denying Democratic nominee Martin Van Buren an electoral majority and forcing a contingent election. Ultimately Van Buren won the electoral college outright and the attempt to invoke the 12th Amendment proved fruitless.

The Whig strategy narrowly failed as Van Buren won an electoral vote majority and an apparent popular vote majority, winning Pennsylvania by 4,222 votes. In South Carolina, whose presidential electors were Whigs, no popular vote was held as the state legislature chose the electors.

The basis for the Whigs' strategy lay in a severe state-level Democratic Party split in Pennsylvania that propelled the Whig-aligned Anti-Masonic Party to statewide power. Party alignments by state in the House of Representatives suggest that any contingent election would have had an uncertain outcome, with none of the candidates (Van Buren, William Henry Harrison and Hugh White) having a clear path to victory.

In that same election, no candidate for vice president secured an electoral majority as the Democratic electors from Virginia refused to vote for Democratic vice presidential nominee, Richard Mentor Johnson, due to his relationship with a former slave, and instead cast their votes for William Smith.

As a result, Johnson received 147 electoral votes, one vote short of a majority, followed by Francis Granger with 77, John Tyler with 47 and Smith with 23. Thus, it became necessary for the Senate to hold a contingent election between Johnson and Granger for vice president, which Johnson won on the first ballot with 33 votes to Granger's 16.

Since 1836, no major U.S. party has nominated multiple regional presidential or vice presidential candidates in an election. However, since the Civil War, there have been two serious attempts by Southern-based parties to run regional candidates in hopes of denying either of the two major party tickets an electoral college majority. Both attempts (in 1948 and 1968) narrowly failed; in both cases, a shift in the result of two or three close states would have forced these respective elections into the House (for president) and Senate (for vice president).

In modern elections, a running mate is often selected in order to appeal to a different set of voters. A Habitation Clause issue arose during the 2000 presidential election contested by George W. Bush (running-mate Dick Cheney, who Bush selected) and Al Gore (running-mate Joe Lieberman), because it was alleged that Bush and Cheney were both inhabitants of Texas and that the Texas electors therefore violated the Twelfth Amendment in casting their ballots for both. Texas' 32 electoral votes were necessary in order to secure Bush and Cheney a majority in the Electoral College. With the Democrats picking up four seats in the Senate to equal the Republicans at 50 seats each in the chamber, the outcome of a contingent election in the Senate, especially if it had happened after the newly elected senators had been seated, would have been far from certain; in fact such an election in 2000, had it happened, would have determined which party controlled the Senate.

Bush's residency was unquestioned, as he was Governor of Texas at the time. However, Cheney and his wife had moved to Dallas five years earlier when he assumed the role of chief executive at Halliburton. Cheney had grown up in Wyoming, had represented it in Congress and had continuously maintained a residence in the state during his tenure at Halliburton. A few months before the election, he switched his voter registration and driver's license to Wyoming and put his home in Dallas up for sale. On July 21, 2000, Cheney changed his voter registration from Texas to Teton County, Wyoming. Three Texas voters challenged the election in a federal court in Dallas and then appealed the decision to the United States Court of Appeals for the Fifth Circuit, where it was dismissed.

== See also ==
- United States presidential eligibility legislation
