= Central Locator System =

American safety program

The Central Locator System (sometimes called the Central Locator Service) was a program of the United States' Federal Emergency Management Agency (FEMA) responsible for determining the identity of the President of the United States or the acting president, as well as his or her physical whereabouts. As of the late 2000s, it was slated to be replaced by the Internet Protocol Locator.

== Background ==
During the Cold War, U.S. government planners hypothesized that a major attack against the United States by an adversary using nuclear weapons could cause sufficient confusion that immediate military retaliation might be delayed if the incumbent president had been killed by enemy forces, or was incorrectly believed to have been killed by enemy forces due to his inability to communicate with the military chain of command. The system of Central Locators was created as authorities capable of correctly identifying the President of the United States should multiple persons in the presidential line of succession claim the office, as well as tracking the whereabouts of the principal officeholders in the line of succession to allow them to be quickly contacted should the need arise. It also tracked the planned and future movements of those in the presidential line of succession to ensure that not all potential successors would ever be within physical proximity of each other at the same time.

== Evolution of system ==
=== Manual monitoring ===
According to a 1970s-era Central Locator System handbook, each person in the line of succession was assigned a codename with which he or she could identify themselves to the Central Locator (for instance, the codename assigned to Senate president pro tempore James Eastland was "FOURFINGER", while Treasury Secretary George Shultz was given the codename "FENCING MASTER"). Individuals tracked by the system were required to provide multiple means of contact – including physical addresses, and home, office and mobile radio telephone numbers – and to notify the Central Locator any time they left the city of Washington, D.C., providing their itinerary and places of residence while traveling. During a national emergency, tracked persons were instructed to contact the Central Locator using either landline phone or the Defense Communications System and provide details on their exact whereabouts. In the event of a mass call event that prevented persons in the line of succession from reporting their location to the Central Locator, they were authorized to call the telephone operator and use the message precedence order "FLASH" to override other line traffic and force through a call.

=== Semi-automated monitoring ===
By 2009, the Central Locator System had evolved into a semi-automated system in which "input station users" – designated persons on the staff of each potential presidential successor – would log updates on the whereabouts of the potential successor they were assigned to track into a computerized system which, in turn, could be accessed by "Observer Station users located throughout the United States".

=== Automated monitoring ===
As of the late 2000s, the Central Locator System was slated for replacement by the Internet Protocol Locator.

== See also ==
- Designated survivor
