= Acting President of the United States =

Person acting as U.S. president when the office holder is incapacitated

An acting president of the United States is a person who lawfully exercises the powers and duties of the president of the United States despite not holding the office in their own right. There is an established presidential line of succession in which officials of the United States federal government may be called upon to be acting president if the incumbent president becomes incapacitated, dies, resigns, or is removed from office (by impeachment by the House of Representatives and subsequent conviction by the Senate) during their four-year term of office; or if a president-elect has not been chosen before Inauguration Day or has failed to qualify by that date.

Presidential succession is referred to multiple times in the U.S. Constitution: Article II, Section 1, Clause 6, the Twentieth Amendment, and the Twenty-fifth Amendment. The vice president is the only officeholder explicitly named in the Constitution as a presidential successor. The Article II succession clause authorizes Congress to designate which federal officeholders would accede to the presidency if the vice president were unable to do so, a situation which has never occurred. The current Presidential Succession Act was adopted in 1947 and last revised in 2006. The order of succession is as follows: the vice president, the speaker of the House of Representatives, the president pro tempore of the Senate, and then the eligible heads of the federal executive departments who form the president's Cabinet in the order of creation of the department, beginning with the secretary of state.

The vice president immediately assumes the presidency in the event of the death, resignation, or removal of the president from office. Similarly, if a president-elect were to die during the transition period or decline to serve, the vice president-elect would become president on Inauguration Day. A vice president may also serve as acting president if the president becomes incapacitated. If both the presidency and vice presidency were to become vacant, the statutory successor would act as president but would not formally assume the office. To date, three vice presidents have briefly served as acting president without assuming the office of President.

== Constitutional provisions ==
=== Eligibility ===
The qualifications for acting president are the same as those for the office of president. Article II, Section 1, Clause 5 of the Constitution prescribes three eligibility requirements for the presidency. At the time of taking office, one must be a natural-born citizen of the United States, at least thirty-five years old, and a resident of the United States for at least fourteen years.

=== Succession ===
Article II, Section 1, Clause 6 makes the vice president first in the line of succession. It also empowers Congress to provide by law who would act as president in the case where neither the president nor the vice president were able to serve.

Two constitutional amendments elaborate on the subject of presidential succession and fill gaps exposed over time in the original provision.

- Section 3 of the Twentieth Amendment declares that if the president-elect dies before their term begins, the vice president-elect becomes president on Inauguration Day and serves for the full term to which the president-elect was elected, and also that, if on Inauguration Day, a president has not been chosen or the president-elect does not qualify for the presidency, the vice president-elect acts as president until a president is chosen or the president-elect qualifies. It also authorizes Congress to provide for instances in which neither a president-elect nor a vice president-elect have qualified. Acting on this authority, Congress incorporated "failure to qualify" as a possible condition for presidential succession into the Presidential Succession Act of 1947.
- Sections 3 and 4 of the Twenty-fifth Amendment provide for situations in which the president is temporarily or indefinitely unable to discharge the powers and duties of their office.
  - The former section enables the president to voluntarily transfer their powers and duties (but not the office itself) to the vice president (who becomes acting president), by notifying the president pro tempore of the Senate and the speaker of the House of Representatives. The vice president remains acting president until such a time that the president is able to discharge their powers and duties again.
  - The latter section provides a mechanism to remove the president's powers and duties without their consent. It is invoked when the vice president and a majority of the 15 Cabinet secretaries write to the Senate president pro tempore and the House speaker to notify them that the president is unable to discharge their powers and duties. The vice president then immediately assumes the role of acting president. Should the president declare that they are still capable of discharging their powers and duties, the vice president and Cabinet secretaries can write a second letter to Congress, reaffirming their position. If this letter is received within four days, then the matter is debated and voted on by Congress (with any attempt to permanently install the vice president as acting president requiring a two-thirds majority of each house). If no such letter is received within the time limit or the vote does not pass in Congress within 21 days, then the president reassumes his powers and duties.

== History ==
=== Before the Twenty-fifth Amendment ===
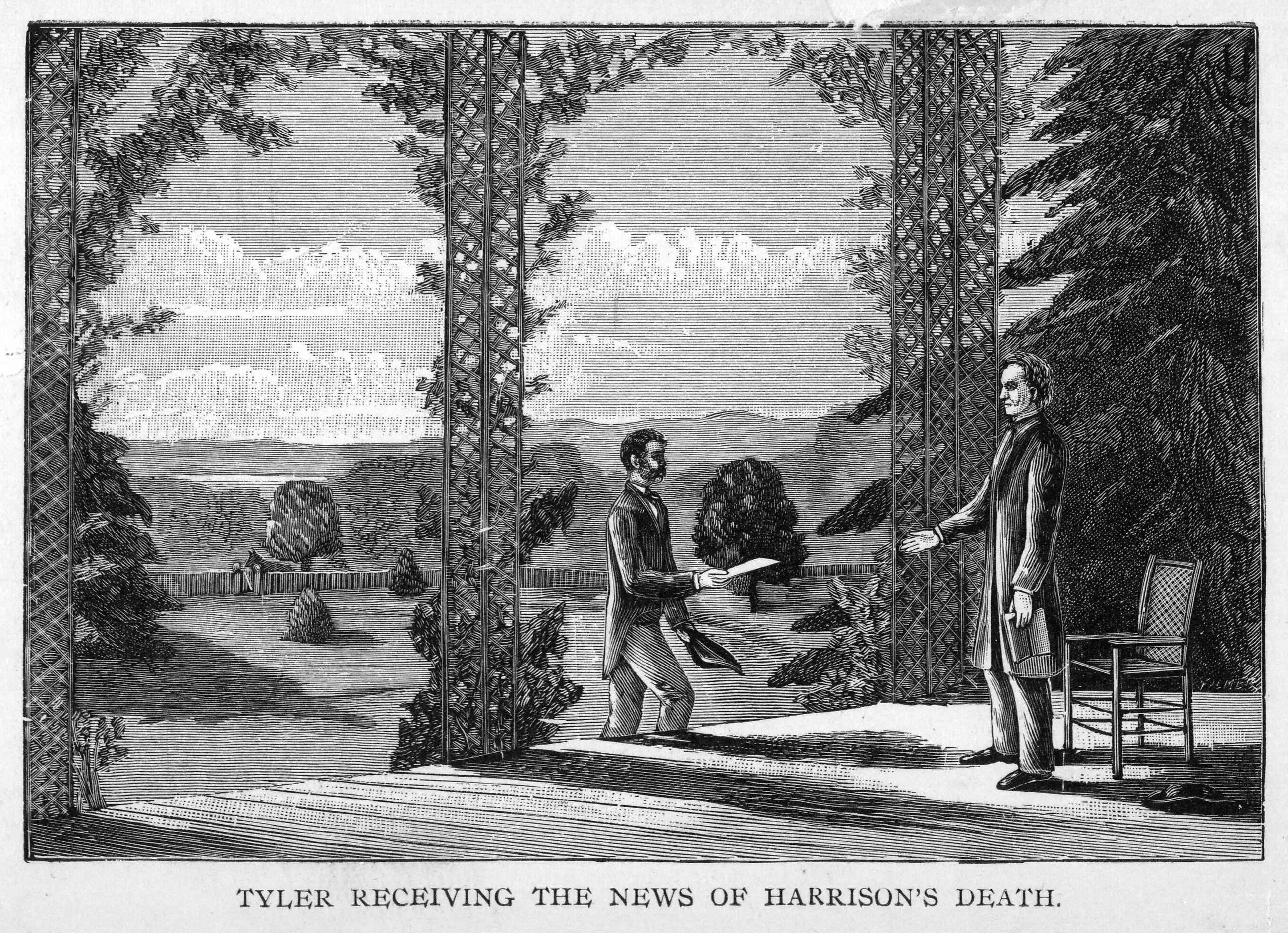
1888 illustration of John Tyler receiving notification of William Henry Harrison's death

On April 4, 1841, only one month after his inauguration, William Henry Harrison died and was the first U.S. president to die in office. Afterward, a constitutional crisis ensued over the Constitution's ambiguous presidential succession provision (Article II, Section 1, Clause 6).

Shortly after Harrison's death, his Cabinet met and decided that John Tyler, Harrison's vice president, would assume the responsibilities of the presidency under the title "Vice-President acting President". Instead of accepting this proposed title, however, Tyler asserted that the Constitution gave him full and unqualified powers of the presidency and had himself sworn in as president; this set the Tyler Precedent for the orderly transfer of power following a president's death. Nonetheless, several members of Congress, such as representative and former president John Quincy Adams, felt that Tyler should be a caretaker under the title of "acting president", or remain vice president in name. Senator Henry Clay saw Tyler as the "vice-president" and his presidency as a mere "regency".

Throughout, Tyler remained resolute in his claim to the title of president and in his determination to exercise the full powers of the presidency. The Senate and House confirmed Tyler as president via resolution. The precedent he set in 1841 was followed subsequently on seven occasions when an incumbent president died prior to the presidential succession being enshrined in the Constitution through section 1 of the Twenty-fifth Amendment.

Though the precedent regarding presidential succession due to the president's death was set, questions concerning presidential "inability" remained unanswered, such as what constituted an inability, who determined the existence of an inability, and whether a vice president becomes president for the rest of the presidential term in the case of an inability or if they are merely "acting as president". Due to this lack of clarity, later vice presidents were hesitant to assert any role in cases of presidential inability.

On two occasions, in particular, the operations of the executive branch were hampered due to the fact that there was no constitutional basis for declaring that the president was unable to function:

- For 79 days in 1881, between the shooting of President James A. Garfield in July and his death in September. Congressional leaders urged Vice President Chester A. Arthur to step up and exercise presidential authority while the president was disabled, but he declined, fearful of being labeled a usurper. Aware that he was in a delicate position and that his every action was placed under scrutiny, he remained secluded in his New York City home for most of the summer.
- October 1919 – March 1921, when President Woodrow Wilson suffered a debilitating stroke. Nearly blind and partially paralyzed, he spent the final 17 months of his presidency sequestered in the White House. Vice President Thomas R. Marshall, the cabinet, and the nation were kept in the dark concerning the severity of the president's illness for several months by First Lady Edith Wilson, the president's personal physician, and his secretary. Marshall was pointedly afraid to ask about Wilson's health, or to preside over cabinet meetings, fearful that he would be accused of "longing for his place."

=== Since the Twenty-fifth Amendment ===
Proposed by the 89th Congress and subsequently ratified by the states in 1967, the Twenty-fifth Amendment, as noted above, established formal procedures for addressing instances of presidential disability and succession. As of 2026, the powers of the president have only been transferred in accordance with Section 3, covering the voluntary transfer of powers and duties. Section 4, covering the involuntary transfer of powers and duties, has not been invoked since the amendment came into force. Three vice presidents have served as acting president on four occasions, each one while the president underwent a medical procedure under general anesthesia.

Vice presidents who served as acting president
Acting president	Date	Start/end times	President	Event
George H. W. Bush	July 13, 1985	11:28 am – 7:22 pm EDT	Ronald Reagan	Colon cancer surgery
Dick Cheney	June 29, 2002	7:09 am – 9:24 am EDT	George W. Bush	Colonoscopy
Dick Cheney	July 21, 2007	7:16 am – 9:21 am EDT	George W. Bush	Colonoscopy
Kamala Harris	November 19, 2021	10:10 am – 11:35 am EST	Joe Biden	Colonoscopy
