= Continuity of Government Commission =

Private, non-partisan think tank (2002–2011)

The Continuity of Government Commission was a nonpartisan think tank established in 2002 in the United States by the American Enterprise Institute (AEI) and the Brookings Institution following the September 11, 2001, terrorist attacks. Its purpose was to examine how the three branches of the U.S. federal government might reconstitute themselves after a catastrophic attack (decapitation strike) on the nation's capital, and to make recommendations for constitutional and statutory changes that would facilitate the continuity of government. Former presidents Jimmy Carter and Gerald Ford served as its honorary co-chairmen.

== Recommendations ==
In 2003 the Commission published its first report, which dealt with the death or incapacitation of several members of Congress in the event of a terrorist attack. It recommended a constitutional amendment to allow Congress to legislate for the temporary appointment of members of both houses of Congress in case a large number of members were either killed or rendered unable to perform their duties. The United States Senate already is covered by measures that allow replacements to be readily made to fill vacancies. The commission warned that it takes an average of four months to stage the special election needed to fill a vacancy in the United States House of Representatives, which meant that an attack on members of the House could kill or incapacitate so many members of the body that it would not be able to operate at all and might appear illegitimate if it did so. A major attack could mean that Congress would have to confirm a Vice President or fill a vacancy on the Supreme Court of the United States without the needed quorum to perform its obligations. The Commission's recommendations were based on already existing state constitutional provisions which allow for succession of state legislators.

In 2009, its second report recommended amending the rules for succession to the presidency, by removing members of Congress from the line of succession, and including people who do not normally reside in Washington, D.C. in case of a catastrophic attack on the city.

Also in 2009 the Commission published a "mini-report" summarizing its First Report, and criticizing as inadequate legislation enacted by Congress in 2005 to deal with the event of a catastrophic attack on Congress.

In 2011 its third full report dealt with measures to keep the Supreme Court in operation in the event that its membership falls below a quorum (that is, fewer than six justices). The Commission recommended creating an "emergency interim court" of senior judges which could hear cases instead of the Supreme Court, with a right of appeal to the Supreme Court once the Supreme Court was quorate again.

After publishing its third report the Commission was dissolved.

== Members ==
In addition to former presidents Jimmy Carter and Gerald Ford serving as the Commission's honorary co-chairmen, other members have included former elected officials, academics, cabinet officials and senior policy advisers such as Philip Bobbitt, Lloyd Cutler, Kenneth Duberstein, Charles Fried, Newt Gingrich, Jamie Gorelick, Nicholas Katzenbach, Lynn Martin, Kweisi Mfume, Robert H. Michel, Leon Panetta, Donna Shalala and Alan K. Simpson.

== Influence in other countries ==
Having reviewed the Commission's 2003 recommendations, the Australian government released plans in 2005 under which members of Parliament who survived an attack would be moved to a secure bunker that would allow them to maintain the functions of government, and also addressed the issues of mass vacancies caused by such an attack.
