= Twentieth Amendment to the United States Constitution =

1933 amendment changing term dates for elected federal officials

The Twentieth Amendment (Amendment XX) to the United States Constitution moved the beginning and ending of the terms of the president and vice president from March 4 to January 20, and of members of Congress from March 4 to January 3. It also has provisions that determine what is to be done when there is no president-elect. The Twentieth Amendment was adopted on January 23, 1933.

The amendment reduced the presidential transition and the "lame duck" period, by which members of Congress and the president serve the remainder of their terms after an election. The amendment established congressional terms to begin before presidential terms and that the incoming Congress, rather than the outgoing one, would hold a contingent election if the Electoral College deadlocked regarding either the presidential or vice presidential elections.

== Text ==
Section 1. The terms of the President and Vice President shall end at noon on the 20th day of January, and the terms of Senators and Representatives at noon on the 3d day of January, of the years in which such terms would have ended if this article had not been ratified; and the terms of their successors shall then begin.

Section 2. The Congress shall assemble at least once in every year, and such meeting shall begin at noon on the 3d day of January unless they shall by law appoint a different day.

Section 3. If, at the time fixed for the beginning of the term of the President, the President-elect shall have died, the Vice President-elect shall become President. If a President shall not have been chosen before the time fixed for the beginning of his term, or if the President-elect shall have failed to qualify, then the Vice President-elect shall act as President until a President shall have qualified; and the Congress may by law provide for the case wherein neither a President-elect nor a Vice President-elect shall have qualified, declaring who shall then act as President, or the manner in which one who is to act shall be selected, and such person shall act accordingly until a President or Vice President shall have qualified.

Section 4. The Congress may by law provide for the case of the death of any of the persons from whom the House of Representatives may choose a President whenever the right of choice shall have devolved upon them, and for the case of the death of any of the persons from whom the Senate may choose a Vice President whenever the right of choice shall have devolved upon them.

Section 5. Sections 1 and 2 shall take effect on the 15th day of October following the ratification of this article.

Section 6. This article shall be inoperative unless it shall have been ratified as an amendment to the Constitution by the legislatures of three-fourths of the several States within seven years from the date of its submission.

== Historical background ==
=== Original text of the Constitution ===
Article I, Section 4, Clause 2 of the Constitution states that Congress must meet at least once a year. The default date specified is the first Monday in December, though Congress is empowered to set another date and the president can summon special sessions.

The original text of the Constitution set a duration for the terms of federal elected officials, but not the specific dates on which those terms would begin or end. In September 1788, after the necessary nine states had ratified the Constitution, the Congress of the Confederation set March 4, 1789, as the date "for commencing proceedings" of the newly reorganized government. Although the new Congress and presidential administration did not begin operating until April, March 4 was designated as the official start of the newly elected officials' terms, and thus the starting point for the terms of their successors. The Constitution did not specify a date for federal elections; however, by the second presidential election in 1792, Congress had enacted a law requiring presidential electors to be chosen in November or early December. In 1845, the 28th Congress narrowed the appointment in each State of Electors (of President and Vice President) to a single day: The "Tuesday next after the first Monday in the month of November". Congressional elections were generally held on the same day.

=== Issues ===
The result of these scheduling decisions was that there was a long, four-month lame duck period between the election and inauguration of the new president. For Congress, the situation was perhaps even more awkward. Because Article I, Section 4, Clause 2 mandated a Congressional meeting every December, after the election but before Congressional terms of office had expired, a lame-duck session was required by the Constitution in even-numbered years; the next session was not required until the next December, meaning new members of Congress might not begin their work until more than a year after they had been elected. Special sessions sometimes met earlier in the year, but this never became a regular practice, despite the Constitution allowing for it. In practice, Congress usually met in a long session beginning in Decembers of odd-numbered years, and in a short lame-duck session in December of even-numbered years.

The long lame-duck period might have been a practical necessity at the end of the 18th century, when any newly elected official might require several months to put his affairs in order and then undertake an arduous journey from his home to the national capital, but it eventually had the effect of impeding the functioning of government in the modern age. From the early 19th century, it also meant a lame-duck Congress and presidential administration would fail to adequately respond to a significant national crisis in a timely manner. Each institution could do this on the theory that, at best, a lame-duck Congress or administration had neither the time nor the mandate to tackle problems, whereas the incoming administration or Congress would have both the time and a fresh electoral mandate, to examine and address the problems the nation faced. These problems very likely would have been at the center of the debate of the just-completed election cycle.

This dilemma was seen most notably in 1861 and 1933, after the elections of Abraham Lincoln and Franklin D. Roosevelt, respectively, plus the newly elected senators and representatives. Under the Constitution at the time, these presidents had to wait four months before they and the incoming Congresses could deal with the secession of Southern states and the Great Depression respectively.

== Proposal and ratification ==
The Twentieth Amendment,
National Archives

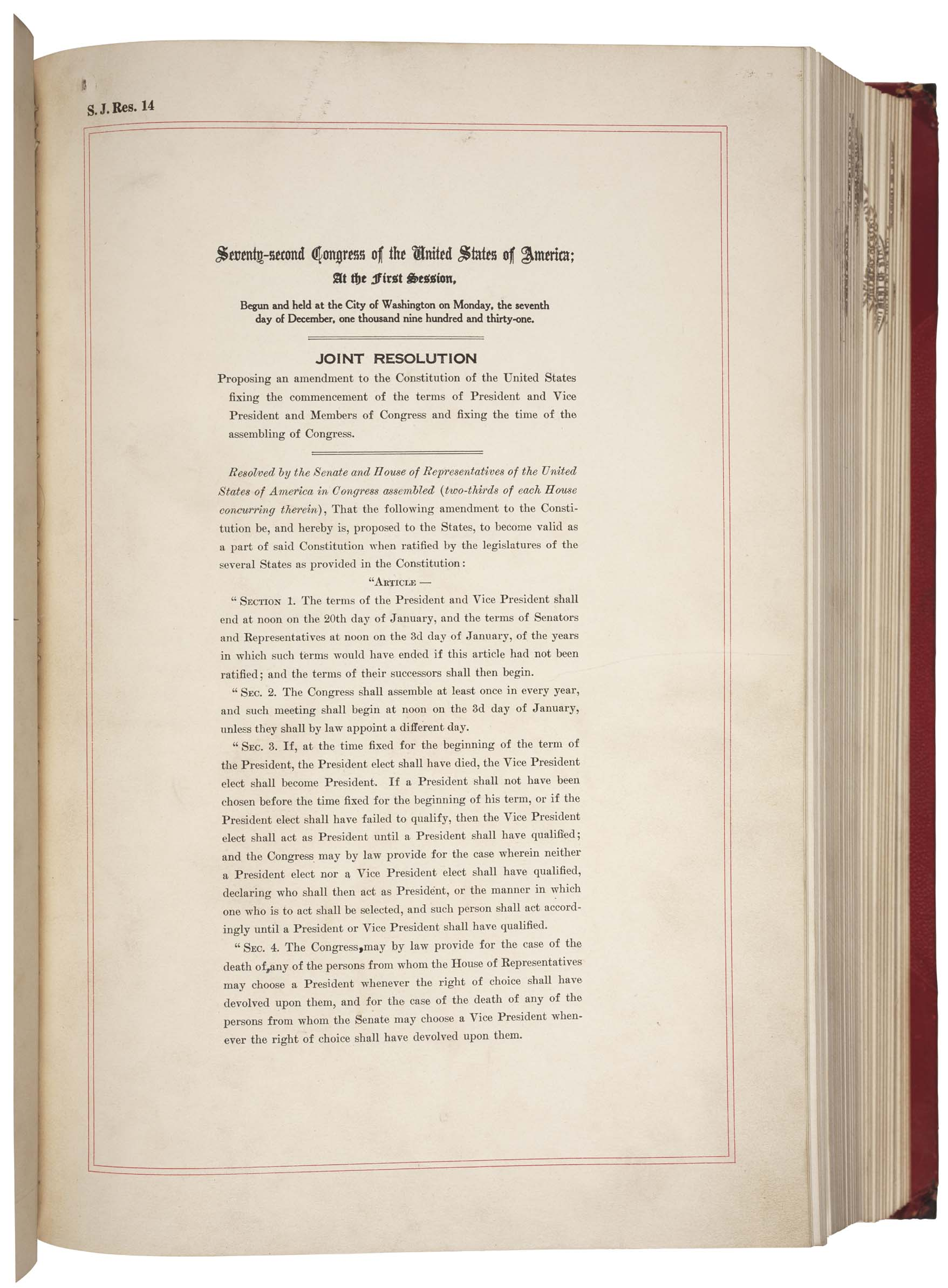

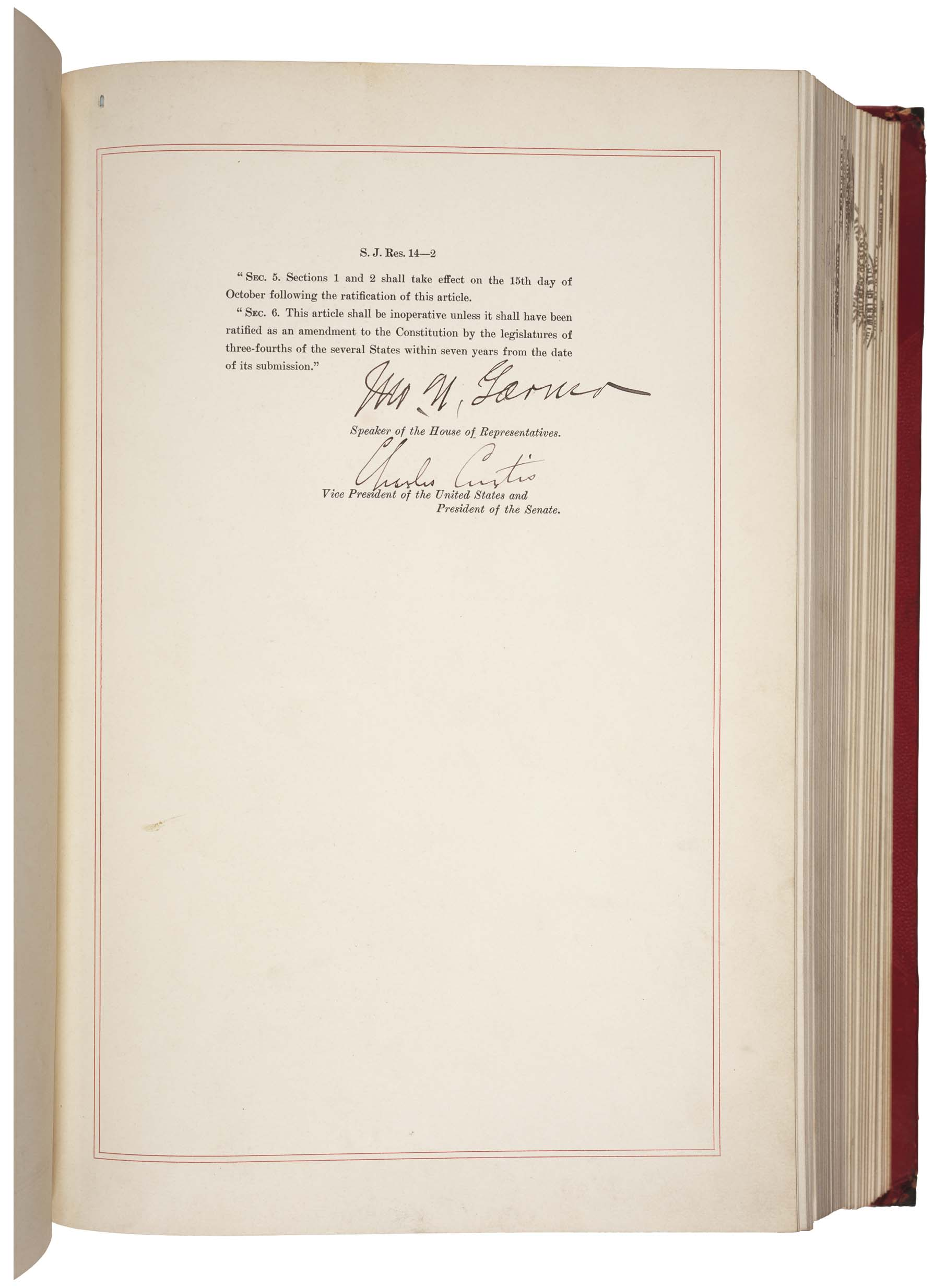

The 72nd Congress proposed the Twentieth Amendment on March 2, 1932, and the amendment was ratified by the following states. The Amendment was adopted on January 23, 1933, after 36 states, being three-fourths of the then-existing 48 states, ratified the Amendment.

1. Virginia: March 4, 1932
2. New York: March 11, 1932
3. Mississippi: March 16, 1932
4. Arkansas: March 17, 1932
5. Kentucky: March 17, 1932
6. New Jersey: March 21, 1932
7. South Carolina: March 25, 1932
8. Michigan: March 31, 1932
9. Maine: April 1, 1932
10. Rhode Island: April 14, 1932
11. Illinois: April 21, 1932
12. Louisiana: June 22, 1932
13. West Virginia: July 30, 1932
14. Pennsylvania: August 11, 1932
15. Indiana: August 15, 1932
16. Texas: September 7, 1932
17. Alabama: September 13, 1932
18. California: January 4, 1933
19. North Carolina: January 5, 1933
20. North Dakota: January 9, 1933
21. Minnesota: January 12, 1933
22. Arizona: January 13, 1933
23. Montana: January 13, 1933
24. Nebraska: January 13, 1933
25. Oklahoma: January 13, 1933
26. Kansas: January 16, 1933
27. Oregon: January 16, 1933
28. Delaware: January 19, 1933
29. Washington: January 19, 1933
30. Wyoming: January 19, 1933
31. Iowa: January 20, 1933
32. South Dakota: January 20, 1933
33. Tennessee: January 20, 1933
34. Idaho: January 21, 1933
35. New Mexico: January 21, 1933
36. Missouri: January 23, 1933
  This satisfied the requirement for three-fourths of the then-existing 48 states. The amendment was subsequently ratified by:
37. Georgia: January 23, 1933
38. Ohio: January 23, 1933
39. Utah: January 23, 1933
40. Massachusetts: January 24, 1933
41. Wisconsin: January 24, 1933
42. Colorado: January 24, 1933
43. Nevada: January 26, 1933
44. Connecticut: January 27, 1933
45. New Hampshire: January 31, 1933
46. Vermont: February 2, 1933
47. Maryland: March 24, 1933
48. Florida: April 26, 1933

== Effects ==
Section 1 of the Twentieth Amendment prescribes that the start and end of the four-year term of both the president and vice president shall be at noon on January 20. The change superseded the Twelfth Amendment's reference to March 4 as the date by which the House of Representatives must—under circumstances where no candidate won an absolute majority of votes for president in the Electoral College—conduct a contingent presidential election. The new date reduced the period between election day in November and Inauguration Day, the presidential transition, by about six weeks. Section 1 also specifies noon January 3 as the start and end of the terms of members of the Senate and the House of Representatives; the previous date had also been March 4.

Section 2 moves the yearly start date of congressional sessions from the first Monday in December, as mandated by Article I, Section 4, Clause 2, to noon on January 3 of the same year, though Congress still can by law set another date and the president can summon special sessions. This change eliminated the extended lame duck congressional sessions. As a result of this change, if the Electoral College vote has not resulted in the election of either a president or vice president, the incoming Congress, as opposed to the outgoing one, would conduct a contingent election, following the process set out in the Twelfth Amendment.

Section 3 further refines the Twelfth Amendment by declaring that if the president-elect dies before Inauguration Day, the vice president-elect will be sworn in as president on that day and serve for the full four-year term to which that person was elected. It further states that if, on Inauguration Day, a president-elect has not yet been chosen, or if the president-elect fails to qualify, the vice president-elect would become acting president on Inauguration Day until a president-elect is chosen or the president-elect qualifies; previously, the Constitution did not say what was to be done if the Electoral College attempted to elect a constitutionally unqualified person as president.

Section 3 also authorizes Congress to determine who should be acting president if a new president and vice president have not been chosen by Inauguration Day. Acting on this authority, Congress added "failure to qualify" as a possible condition for presidential succession in the Presidential Succession Act of 1947. The Constitution previously had been silent on this point, and this lack of guidance nearly caused constitutional crises on two occasions: when the House of Representatives seemed unable to break the deadlocked election of 1800, and when Congress seemed unable to resolve the disputed election of 1876.

Section 4 permits Congress to statutorily clarify what should occur if either the House of Representatives must elect the president, and one of the candidates from whom it may choose dies, or if the Senate must elect the vice president and one of the candidates from whom it may choose dies. Congress has never enacted such a statute.

=== Effect on the terms of elected officials ===
On February 15, 1933, 23 days after the amendment was adopted, President-elect Franklin Roosevelt was the target of an assassination attempt by Giuseppe Zangara. While Roosevelt was not injured, had the attempt been successful, then vice president-elect John Nance Garner would have become president on March 4, 1933, pursuant to Section 3.

Section 5 delayed Sections 1 and 2 taking effect until the first October 15 following the amendment's ratification. As the amendment was adopted on January 23, 1933, Sections 1 and 2 became effective on October 15, 1933. This shortened the terms of representatives elected to the 73rd Congress (1933–1935) and the terms of senators elected to terms ending in 1935, 1937, and 1939 by 60 days, with those terms ending on January 3 rather than the March 4 date on which those terms originally were due to expire. This also resulted in the 73rd Congress having two different required meeting dates: the old date of March 4 in 1933 and the new date of January 3 in 1934.

The first Congress to open its first session and begin its members' terms on the new date was the 74th Congress in 1935. The first presidential and vice presidential terms to begin on the date appointed by the Twentieth Amendment were the second terms of President Roosevelt and Vice President Garner, on January 20, 1937. As Section 1 had shortened the first term of both (1933–1937) by 43 days, Garner thus served as vice-president for two full terms, but he did not serve a full eight years: his vice presidency spanned from March 4, 1933, to January 20, 1941.
