= United States Secretary of State =

Head of the US Department of State

- Seal of the secretary of state

- Flag of the secretary of state

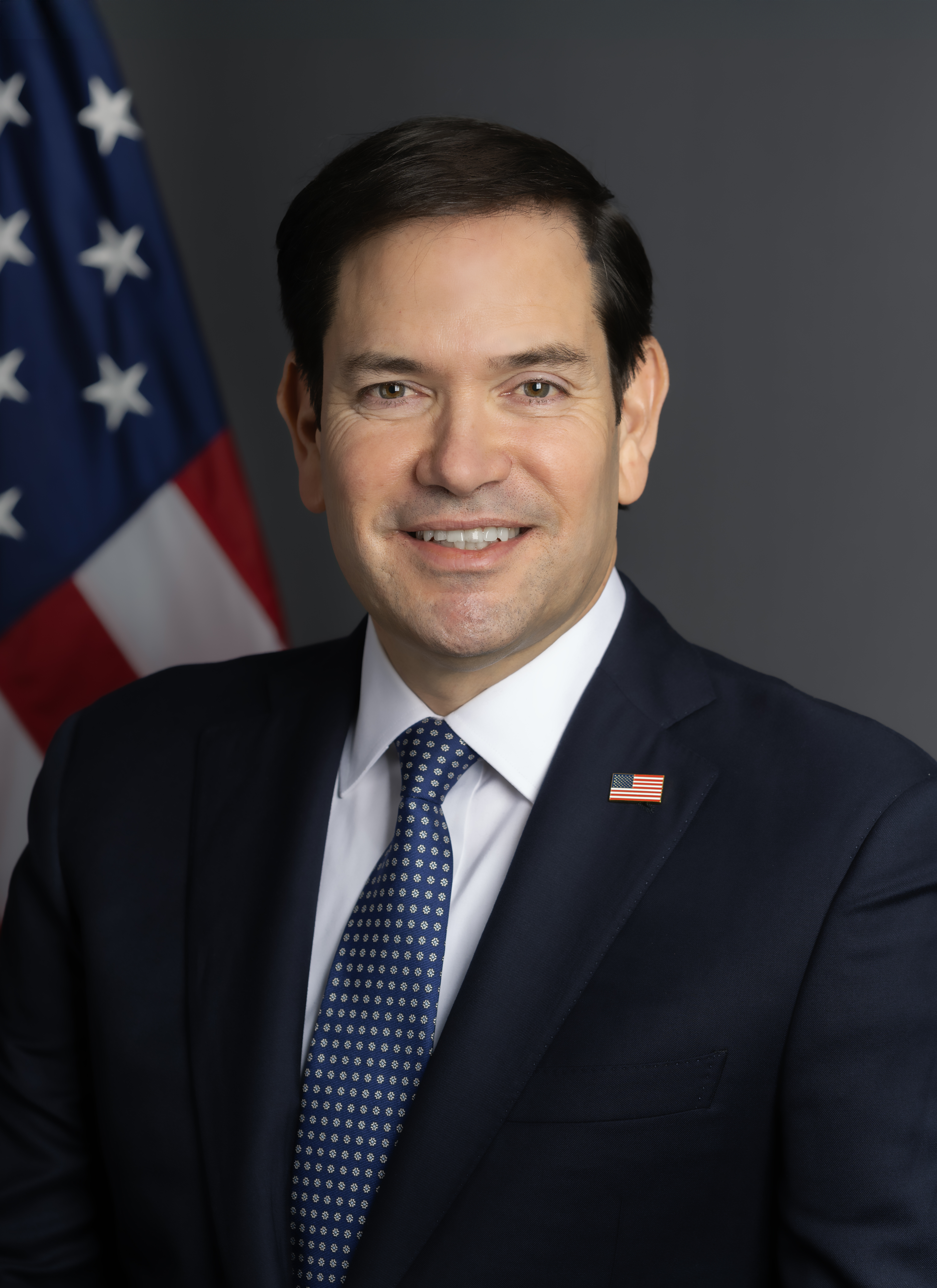
- Incumbent; Marco Rubio since January 21, 2025
- United States Department of State
- Style: Mr. Secretary (informal); The Honorable (formal); His Excellency (diplomatic)
- Abbreviation: SecState
- Member of: Cabinet of the United States; United States National Security Council
- Reports to: President of the United States
- Seat: Harry S Truman Building; Washington, D.C.
- Appointer: The president; with advice and consent of the Senate
- Term length: No fixed term
- Constituting instrument: 22 U.S.C. § 2651
- Precursor: Secretary of Foreign Affairs
- Formation: July 27, 1789; 237 years ago
- First holder: Thomas Jefferson
- Succession: Fourth
- Deputy: United States Deputy Secretary of State
- Salary: Executive Schedule, Level I
- Website: state.gov/secretary

The United States secretary of state (SecState) is a member of the executive branch of the federal government of the United States and the head of the U.S. Department of State, equivalent to a minister of foreign affairs.

The secretary of state serves as the principal advisor to the president of the United States on all foreign affairs matters. The secretary carries out the president's foreign policies through the U.S. Department of State, which includes the Foreign Service, Civil Service, and U.S. Agency for International Development. The office holder is the second-highest-ranking member of the president's cabinet, after the vice president, and ranks fourth in the presidential line of succession; and is first amongst cabinet secretaries.

Created in 1789 with Thomas Jefferson as its first office holder, the secretary of state represents the United States to foreign countries, and is therefore considered analogous to a secretary or minister of foreign affairs in other countries. The secretary of state is nominated by the president of the United States and, following a confirmation hearing before the Senate Committee on Foreign Relations, is confirmed by the Senate. The secretary of state, along with the secretary of the treasury, secretary of defense, and attorney general, are generally regarded as the four most crucial Cabinet members because of the importance of their respective departments.

The secretary of state is a Level I position in the Executive Schedule and thus earns the salary prescribed for that level, $250,600 as of January 2025.

== History ==
The secretary of state originates from the government under the Articles of Confederation. The Congress of the Confederation established the Department of Foreign Affairs in 1781 and created the office of secretary of foreign affairs. After the Constitution of the United States was ratified, the 1st United States Congress reestablished the department, renaming it the Department of State, and created the office of secretary of state to lead the department.

== Duties and responsibilities ==
The stated duties of the secretary of state are to supervise the United States foreign service and immigration policy and administer the Department of State. The secretary must also advise the president on U.S. foreign matters such as the appointment of diplomats and ambassadors, advising the president of the dismissal and recall of these people. The secretary of state can conduct negotiations, interpret, and terminate treaties relating to foreign policy. The secretary also can participate in international conferences, organizations, and agencies as a representative of the United States. The secretary communicates issues relating to the U.S. foreign policy to Congress and citizens. The secretary also provides services to U.S. citizens living or traveling abroad such as providing credentials in the form of passports. Doing this, the secretary also ensures the protection of citizens, their property, and interests in foreign countries.

What are the Qualifications of a Secretary of State? He ought to be a Man of universal Reading in Laws, Governments, History. Our whole terrestrial Universe ought to be summarily comprehended in his Mind.

— John Adams

Secretaries of state also have domestic responsibilities. Most of the historical domestic functions of the Department of State were gradually transferred to other agencies by the late 19th century as part of various administrative reforms and restructurings. Those that remain include storage and use of the Great Seal, performance of protocol functions for the White House, and the drafting of certain proclamations. The secretary also negotiates with the individual states over the extradition of fugitives to foreign countries. Under federal law, the resignation of a president or of a vice president is valid only if declared in writing, in an instrument delivered to the office of the secretary of state. Accordingly, the resignations of President Richard Nixon and of Vice Presidents John C. Calhoun and Spiro Agnew were formalized in instruments delivered to then-Secretary of State Henry Kissinger.

Although they have historically decreased over time, Congress may occasionally add to the responsibilities of the secretary of state. One such instance occurred in 2014, when Congress passed the Sean and David Goldman International Child Abduction Prevention and Return Act which mandated actions the secretary of state must take in order to facilitate the return of abducted children from nations who are party to the Hague Convention on the Civil Aspects of International Child Abduction.

Six past secretaries of state—Jefferson, Madison, Monroe, John Quincy Adams, Van Buren and Buchanan—have gone on to be elected president. Others—including Henry Clay, Daniel Webster, Lewis Cass, John C. Calhoun, John M. Clayton, William L. Marcy, William Seward, Edward Everett, Jeremiah S. Black, James Blaine, Elihu B. Washburne, Thomas F. Bayard, John Sherman, Walter Q. Gresham, William Jennings Bryan, Philander C. Knox, Charles Evans Hughes, Elihu Root, Cordell Hull, Edmund Muskie, Alexander Haig, John Kerry, Hillary Clinton, and Marco Rubio—have also campaigned for president, either before or after their term of office as secretary of state, but were ultimately unsuccessful. The position of secretary of state has therefore been viewed to be a consolation prize for failed presidential candidates.

== Line of succession ==
=== Presidential succession ===
The Secretary of State is 4th in the presidential line of succession following the President pro tempore of the Senate and preceding the Secretary of the Treasury.

== Timeline of secretaries of state ==
The following timeline depicts the progression of the secretaries of state and their political affiliation at the time of assuming office.

== See also ==
- List of international trips made by United States secretaries of state

U.S. order of precedence (ceremonial)
Preceded by Ambassadors from the United States (while at their posts)	Order of precedence of the United States as Secretary of State	Succeeded by Ambassadors to the United States (in order of tenure)
Preceded by Otherwise Kamala Harris as Former Vice-President	Order of precedence of the United States as Secretary of State	Succeeded by Otherwise António Guterres as Secretary-General of the United Nations
U.S. presidential line of succession
Preceded by President pro tempore of the Senate; Chuck Grassley	4th in line	Succeeded by Secretary of the Treasury; Scott Bessent
