= Nonpartisan organizations in the United States =

A nonpartisan organization, in American politics, is a non-profit organization organized United States Internal Revenue Code (501(c)) that qualifies certain non-profit organizations for tax-exempt status because they refrain from engaging in certain political activities prohibited for them. The designation "nonpartisan" usually reflects a claim made by organizations about themselves, or by commentators, and not an official category per American law. Rather, certain types of nonprofit organizations are under varying requirements to refrain from election-related political activities, or may be taxed to the extent they engage in electoral politics, so the word affirms a legal requirement. In this context, "nonpartisan" means that the organization, by US tax law, is prohibited from supporting or opposing political candidates, parties, and in some cases other votes like propositions, directly or indirectly, but does not mean that the organization cannot take positions on political issues.

== Background ==
501(c)(3) is a classification for organizations operated exclusively for religious, charitable, scientific, testing for public safety, literary, educational purposes, to foster national or international amateur sports competition, or for the prevention of cruelty to children or animals.

Among the prohibitions, 501(c)(3) organizations may not become involved in political campaigns by "directly or indirectly participating in, or intervening in, any political campaign on behalf of (or in opposition to) any candidate for elective public office." They may not contribute to campaign funds or make public statements in support of or in opposition to any candidate for public office.

However, such organizations may present public forums, publish voter education guides, and conduct certain other political activities that the Internal Revenue Service classifies as "non-partisan". They may also conduct activities "intended to encourage people to participate" in elections, such as voter registration, training programs, issue briefings, and "get out the vote" drives, if done without bias that would favor one or more candidates over others, or that would oppose candidates. When making public political statements they are required to concentrate on the broader issues, and not make comparisons between candidates. Public forums and other activities are also subject to a number of rules, such as a requirement to invite all viable candidates. Public charities (but not private foundations) may conduct some lobbying activities to influence legislation, if the lobbying activity is not a "substantial part" of its overall activities.

Organizations that violate the IRS rules may have their tax-exempt status revoked or denied, and may face penalties. In addition, concealing or misreporting prohibited activities may, depending on the circumstances, be a crime on the part of the individuals or organizations involved.

== Partisan organizations ==
By contrast, certain other nonprofit organizations are not considered non-partisan:

- 501(c)(4) organizations, which are tax-exempt, are operated exclusively for promoting social welfare, or local organizations with membership limited to a particular company, municipality, or neighborhood, and which devote their earnings to charity, education, or recreation. By contrast with 501(c)(3) organizations they may lobby for legislation and participate in political campaigns and elections, in which case they are not nonpartisan.
- 501(c)(6) organizations are trade group, chambers of commerce, and other business organizations. They can be nonpartisan, but they may also engage in lobbying and other partisan political activities within certain limitations, provided that donations to these groups are not tax deductible to the extent the donations are used for political purposes.
- 527 organizations, which are also tax-exempt, may advocate for political issues but not candidates.
- Political action committees may campaign on behalf of candidates and are not tax exempt.

== Investigations into partisan activities ==
The Internal Revenue Service, or "IRS" (America's federal agency for tax regulation, collection, and enforcement), fields complaints from the public that a nonprofit organization has participated in prohibited political activities. In 2006, the IRS stated that although most of the more than one million 501(c)(3) organizations were compliant, it had conducted 100 investigations in response to complaints from the 2004 election season, of which in 59 out of 82 closed cases it had found "some level" of prohibited activity. It characterized most as minor one-time violations, and issued the offending organizations written advisory letters. It considered three cases serious enough to propose the revocation of the organization's tax-exempt status. The IRS summarized the violations as follows:

- Distributing printed materials encouraging members to vote for a particular candidate (9 violations found out of 24 allegations)
- Religious sermons endorsing or opposing a candidate (12 violations out of 19 allegations)
- Endorsing or opposing a candidate via web content or links (7 violations out of 15)
- Distributing improper voter guides or candidate ratings (4 violations out of 14)
- Posting campaign signs on organization's property (9 violations out of 12)
- Giving preferential treatment to certain candidates at public functions (9 violations out of 11)
- Cash contributions to political campaigns (5 violations out of 7)

=== Allegations of partisanship ===
Despite the relative infrequency of sanctions from the IRS, there have been a number of claims made publicly that nonpartisan organizations had engaged in prohibited partisan activities. Some of these include:

- In 2009, in the wake of a scandal that emerged following the release of several "hidden camera" videotapes, Republican politicians called for an IRS investigation of the Association of Community Organizations for Reform Now, claiming the organization had engaged in improper partisan political activities as well as various forms of fraud. The claims were investigated, and no illegality or fraud was found.
- Churches have occasionally been accused of campaigning for candidates. In most cases the accusations were made against conservative Christian churches for supporting conservative candidates. In the 2006 election season, Citizens for Responsibility and Ethics in Washington filed accusations against several churches in Kansas and Minnesota, and other investigations were opened in California, Missouri and Ohio.
- In 2008 some gay rights activists called for the IRS to revoke the tax-exempt status of the Church of Jesus Christ of Latter-day Saints (LDS Church) over its involvement in California Proposition 8, the initiative to amend the California Constitution to permit only heterosexual marriages. The Church responded that it was individual members, not the church itself, that had donated money to the pro-Proposition 8 campaign, and that any lobbying it was doing on the subject was permissible because it was not "substantial" in proportion to the Church's overall finances.

Occasionally, the IRS, or the party making accusations of partisanship, is itself accused of acting on the basis of a political agenda. The All Saints Episcopal Church in Pasadena, California was investigated over an anti-war sermon posing a hypothetical debate between George W. Bush and John Kerry moderated by Jesus Christ. The IRS concluded that the sermon was in violation of the tax code but did not explain its conclusion, and took no action against the church. The church, in turn, accused the IRS of meddling in politics and asked for an apology.

Additionally, there are concerns that putting the IRS in the role of classifying certain speech as political or apolitical runs a risk of suppressing protected speech, which would violate the First Amendment constitutional guarantee of freedom of speech. In 2008 the Alliance Defense Fund, a conservative Christian organization, recruited 35 churches to conduct sermons urging their congregation to vote for John McCain in the United States presidential election, as an act of civil disobedience, intending to make a test case over the power of the IRS to prohibit churches from endorsing candidates. In turn, others argue that allowing churches to support candidates would violate another provision of the First Amendment, the Establishment Clause, which is interpreted to prohibit the granting of tax-exempt status to political activities undertaken by religious institutions.
