= Superman curse =

Urban myth

The Superman curse refers to a series of supposedly related misfortunes that have plagued creative people involved in adaptations of the DC Comics character Superman in various media, particularly actors who have played the role of Superman on film and television. The "curse" is frequently associated with George Reeves, who starred in Adventures of Superman on television from 1952 to 1958, and died of a self-inflicted gunshot wound at age 45; and Christopher Reeve, the portrayer of the superhero in four theatrical films from 1978 to 1987, who was paralyzed in a 1995 horseback riding accident, and died nine years later at age 52 from heart failure.

The curse is often invoked whenever misfortune is experienced by actors and other personnel who work on Superman adaptations, so much so that some talent agents cite the curse as the reason for the difficulty in casting actors in the role in live-action feature films.

A more prosaic explanation for the alleged 'curse' is that given the high number of people involved in the many adaptations and treatments of the Superman story over the years, a number of significant misfortunes would inevitably occur, as they would do in any substantial sampling of random individuals.

== Superman actors ==
The following actors who played Superman have sometimes been cited as victims of the "Superman curse".

=== Kirk Alyn ===
Kirk Alyn played Superman in two low-budget 1940s serials, but failed to find work afterward due to typecasting. As a result, he was relegated to voice roles, commercials, and uncredited screen roles. He later appeared as Lois Lane's father in the 1978 Superman film. Alyn had Alzheimer's disease later in his life and died in 1999 at the age of 88.

=== Lee Quigley ===
Lee Quigley, who played the infant Superman in the 1978 film, came from an unstable home and suffered schoolyard bullying. He died in 1991 at age 14 from inhalant abuse.

=== George Reeves ===
George Reeves played Superman in the 1951 film Superman and the Mole Men and the ensuing television series Adventures of Superman (1952–1958). Like Alyn, he was too closely associated with the role to find further work. On June 16, 1959, days before he was to be married, Reeves was found dead of a gunshot wound at his home with his Luger pistol near him. The death was ruled a suicide, but controversy surrounds the death, as Reeves's fingerprints were never found on the gun, and he had been having an affair with the wife of MGM exec Eddie Mannix. It was Reeves's death that inspired the conspiracy theories and the urban legend of a curse associated with the character.

=== Christopher Reeve ===
Christopher Reeve played Superman in the 1978–1987 Superman film series: Superman: The Movie (1978), Superman II (1980), Superman III (1983), and Superman IV: The Quest for Peace (1987). Subsequently, he was subject to typecasting and found difficulty acquiring roles, being relegated to Superman sequels and supporting roles. Reeve was paralyzed from the neck down after being thrown from his horse in a cross-country equestrian riding event on May 27, 1995. He died on October 10, 2004, fifteen days after his 52nd birthday. No official autopsy was performed, but both Reeve's wife Dana and his doctor John McDonald believed that an adverse reaction to a drug caused Reeve's death. In one of his last roles, Reeve portrayed supporting character Dr. Virgil Swann on the WB/CW television series Smallville.

== Other alleged victims ==
=== Marlon Brando ===
Marlon Brando, who played Jor-El in the 1978 film, is cited for the misfortune he suffered in his private life, such as his son Christian's shooting of his half-sister Cheyenne's boyfriend in 1990 and subsequent five-year imprisonment, Brando's own admission in court that he had failed his son and daughter, his daughter's 1995 suicide and his later reclusiveness. He died in July 2004, aged 80, three months before his Superman co-star Christopher Reeve. Footage of him would later be posthumously used in 2006's Superman Returns and Superman II: The Richard Donner Cut.

=== Margot Kidder ===
Margot Kidder, who played Superman's love interest Lois Lane opposite Christopher Reeve, had bipolar disorder. In April 1996, she went missing for several days and was found by police in a paranoid, delusional state.

Kidder dismissed the notion of a curse, remarking in a 2002 interview: "That is all newspaper-created rubbish. The idea cracks me up. What about the luck of Superman? When my car crashed this August, if I hadn't hit a telegraph pole after rolling three times, I would have dropped down a 50ft to 60ft ravine. Why don't people focus on that?"

Kidder aged 69 died on May 13, 2018, in Livingston, Montana. A coroner ruled her death a suicide, stating that she died as a result of a self-inflicted drug and alcohol overdose.

=== Richard Pryor ===
Comedian Richard Pryor, who starred as Gus Gorman in Superman III, previously had a drug addiction that led to a near-fatal suicide attempt. Three years later, he was diagnosed with multiple sclerosis. He died of a heart attack on December 10, 2005, at the age of 65.

=== Dana Reeve ===
The curse has been mentioned regarding the death of actress Dana Reeve (the widow of actor Christopher Reeve), who, despite being a non-smoker, died of lung cancer in 2006 at the age of 44.

=== Jerry Siegel and Joe Shuster ===
Jerry Siegel and Joe Shuster, the creators of Superman, sold the rights to their creation to DC Comics for a relatively small amount of money, in contrast to the amount of money the character has generated over the decades. Despite the repeated efforts over the course of the rest of their lives to recover legal ownership of Superman, and a share in the immense profits that the character brought for DC Comics, DC's copyright on the character was renewed. By the 1950s, Shuster's worsening eyesight prevented him from drawing, and he worked as a deliveryman in order to earn a living.

Comic book artist Jerry Robinson claimed that Shuster had delivered a package to the DC building, embarrassing the employees. He was summoned to the CEO, given $100, and told to buy a new coat and find another job. By 1976, Shuster was almost blind and living in a California nursing home. In 1975, Siegel launched a publicity campaign, in which Shuster participated, protesting DC Comics' treatment of him and Shuster. In the face of a great deal of negative publicity over their handling of the affair (and with the Superman feature film coming soon), DC's parent company Warner Communications reinstated the byline dropped more than 30 years earlier and granted the pair a lifetime pension of $20,000 a year, plus health benefits. The first issue with the restored credit was Superman (vol. 1) #302 (August 1976). Siegel died in 1996 and Shuster in 1992.

=== Max and Dave Fleischer ===
Brothers Max Fleischer and Dave Fleischer of Fleischer Studios, who produced the Paramount Superman cartoons began to quarrel with one another and their studio suffered a financial disaster. After selling to Paramount Studios in 1942 by its son-in-law, Seymour Kneitel, and becoming Famous Studios, the new owners fired the two brothers. Max died in poverty in a film industry charity hospital in 1972, while Dave died of a stroke in 1979.

=== DVD crew of Superman Returns ===
The curse was invoked after three people involved in the creation of the Superman Returns DVD were injured. One of them fell down a flight of stairs, another was mugged and physically assaulted, and a third smashed into a glass window. Director Bryan Singer remarked: "My DVD crew absorbed the curse for us".

=== Allison Mack ===
Allison Mack, who played Chloe Sullivan on the TV series Smallville, was accused of sex trafficking and forced human labor and was arrested in April 2018 on those charges. An article on Fox News speculated whether this was related to the curse. On April 8, 2019, Mack pleaded guilty to racketeering and racketeering conspiracy and admitted to state law extortion and forced labor. In June 2021, she was sentenced to three years in prison. She was released early on July 3, 2023, after serving 1 year, 9 months, and 20 days of that 3-year sentence, but did not return to acting.

=== Gene Hackman ===
Gene Hackman, who played Lex Luthor in the 1978 film and two of its sequels, died under mysterious circumstances with his wife and dog in February 2025. It was later discovered that he had died a week after his wife, Betsy Arakawa, died of hantavirus pulmonary syndrome. His cause of death was cardiac arrest exacerbated by advanced Alzheimer's disease.

== Superman actors not generally believed to have become victims of the curse ==
The following actors have either portrayed Superman in TV series or voiced him in animated cartoons, but are not typically associated with the curse.

=== Dean Cain ===
Dean Cain became a household name in the early to mid-1990s for his portrayal of Superman in Lois & Clark: The New Adventures of Superman. Cain's other television roles include Frasier and Law & Order, as well as made-for-TV movies. He made guest appearances in two other Superman-related series: in an episode of Smallville as the villainous Dr. Curtis Knox, and a recurring role in Supergirl as the title character's foster father, Jeremiah Danvers. ABC News correspondent Buck Wolf once commented, "(Cain) has yet to find the right role".

=== Bud Collyer ===
Bud Collyer voiced the Superman radio drama and the first series of Superman cartoons from 1941 to 1942. He went on to enjoy a career in TV, hosting the game show To Tell the Truth. He returned to Superman by voicing The New Adventures of Superman for CBS in 1966. He died in 1969 of circulatory ailment at the age of 61. Voice actors have generally been considered not to be affected by the curse.

=== Brandon Routh ===
Actor Brandon Routh, who played Superman in the 2006 film Superman Returns, dismisses the notion of the curse. He stated that what occurs to one person or set of people will not necessarily occur to everyone, and that he does not live his life in fear. Routh eventually played Ray Palmer (the Atom) on other DC Comics-related projects, was a recurring character in Arrow and The Flash, and was a regular in the spin-off series Legends of Tomorrow (occasionally, his role as Superman is referenced in the Arrowverse). He revisited the role in the crossover storyline "Crisis on Infinite Earths".

=== Tom Welling ===
Tom Welling played Clark Kent in the series Smallville, which aired from 2001 to 2011. He told attendees at Fan Expo Canada that while he did have doubts about taking on the part of the character, they stemmed from the secrecy with which the producers initially withheld details about the production, and not the purported curse, to which he had not paid any mind. Welling explained that once he was given a script to read, his doubts were put to rest. He later reappears as Clark Kent in the 2019–2020 Arrowverse crossover storyline "Crisis on Infinite Earths", as a husband and father who has given up his powers, and is therefore immune to the kryptonite with which Lex Luthor attempts to kill him.

=== Bob Holiday ===
Bob Holiday played Superman on Broadway in the 1960s musical It's a Bird... It's a Plane... It's Superman. He called the idea of a Superman curse as "silly" and stated that "nothing but good" came from his playing Superman.

=== Henry Cavill ===
Henry Cavill played Superman in the films of the DC Extended Universe, spanning Man of Steel (2013) to The Flash (2023). He has said that he does not believe that there is a Superman curse, and that incidents thought to be evidence of the "curse" are simply bad luck.

=== Tyler Hoechlin ===
Tyler Hoechlin first portrayed Superman as a recurring supporting character in The CW's Supergirl (2016–2019) before starring in the spinoff Superman & Lois (2021–2024). In an April 2025 article for FandomWire, Sonika Kamble, reflecting on Hoechlin's successful four-year run on the latter series, wrote, "Hoechlin managed to stay clear of any scandals, career revamps, and thankfully, no personal tragedies happened either. In a role famously marred by unfinished stories, he achieved something historic and proved that the curse isn’t a guarantee after all."

== See also ==
- Atuk
- Hollywoodland
- Poltergeist curse
- Kennedy curse
- Curse of Tippecanoe
- Second-term curse
