= Dead Presidents (disambiguation) =

Dead Presidents is a 1995 action-thriller film.

Dead Presidents may also refer to:

- Dead Presidents (soundtrack), a soundtrack album from the 1995 film
- List of presidents of the United States by date of death
- Money, especially Federal Reserve Notes that depict dead presidents of the United States
- Dead Prez, an American hip hop group
- "Dead Presidents (song)" and "Dead Presidents II", songs performed by Jay-Z
