= Curse of Tippecanoe =

Supposed pattern of U.S. presidential deaths

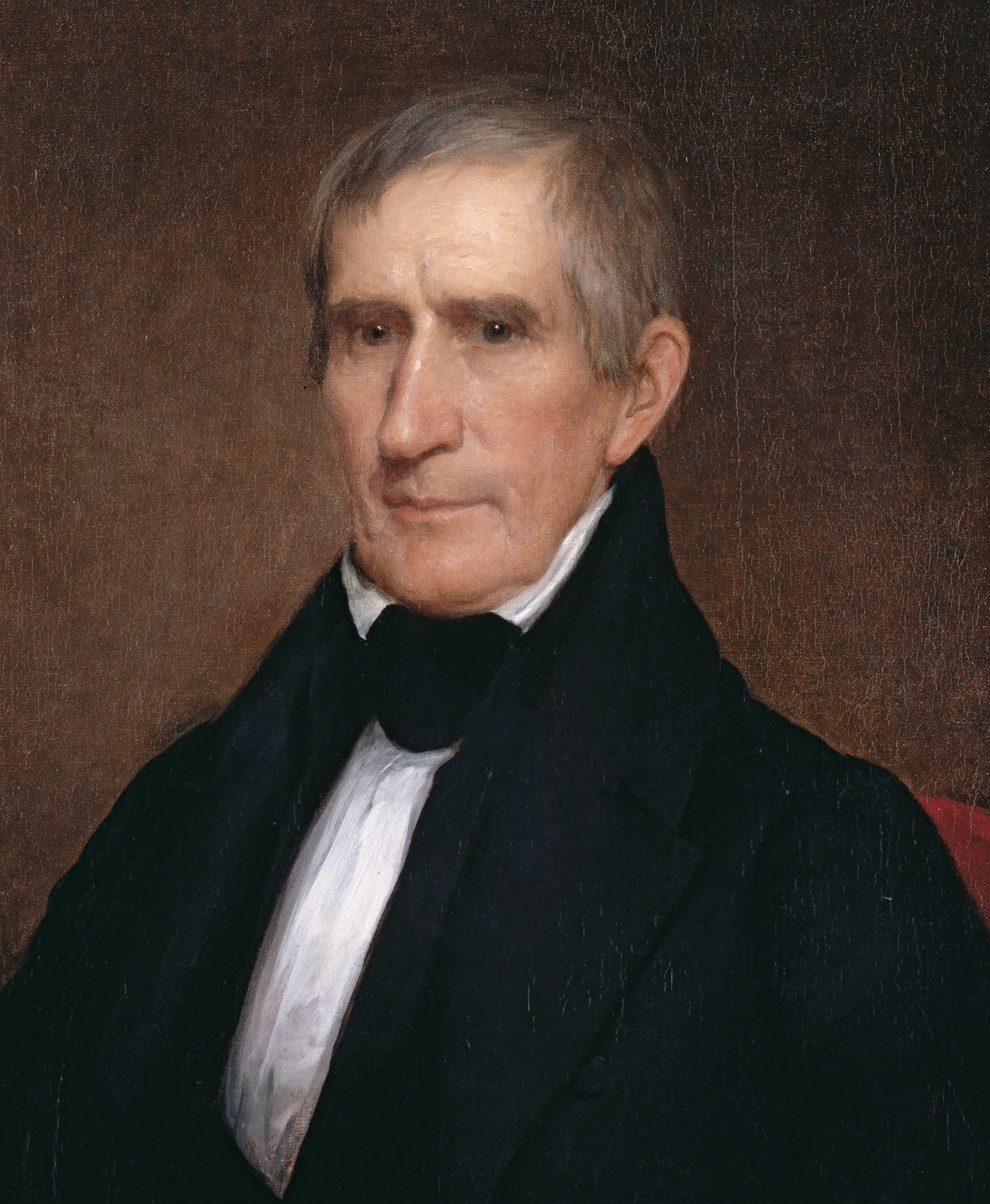
William Henry Harrison, nicknamed Old Tippecanoe, died just a month after taking office in 1841. His death is the first attributed to the Curse of Tippecanoe.

The Curse of Tippecanoe (also known as Tecumseh's Curse, the 20-year Curse or the Zero Curse) is an urban legend about the deaths in office of presidents of the United States who were elected in years divisible by 20. According to the legend, Tenskwatawa, leader of Native American tribes defeated in 1811 at the Battle of Tippecanoe by a military expedition led by William Henry Harrison, had cursed the "Great White Fathers".

Since 1840, eight presidents have died in office. Seven of them were elected in years divisible by 20: William Henry Harrison (1840), Abraham Lincoln (1860), (Note: Note that Lincoln did not die during his first term, to which he was elected in 1860, but rather during his second, to which he was elected in 1864.) James A. Garfield (1880), William McKinley (1900), Warren G. Harding (1920), Franklin D. Roosevelt (1940), (Note: Note that Roosevelt did not die during his third term, to which he was elected in 1940, but rather during his fourth, to which he was elected in 1944.) and John F. Kennedy (1960). Three former presidents elected in applicable years did not die in office: Ronald Reagan in 1980, (Note: Reagan was seriously wounded in a 1981 assassination attempt, but survived.) George W. Bush in 2000, and Joe Biden in 2020.

== History ==
William Henry Harrison was elected president in 1840 and died in 1841, just a month after being sworn in. In Tecumseh's War, Shawnee leader Tecumseh and his younger brother Tenskwatawa organized a confederation of Indian tribes to resist the westward expansion of the United States. In the 1811 Battle of Tippecanoe, Harrison defeated Tenskwatawa and his troops, acting as the governor of the Indiana Territory. Harrison thus earned the moniker "Old Tippecanoe".

In 1931 and 1948, the trivia book series Ripley's Believe It or Not! noted the pattern and termed it the "Curse of Tippecanoe". Strange as It Seems by John Hix ran a cartoon prior to the election of 1940 titled "Curse over the White House!" and claimed that "In the last 100 years, Every U.S. President Elected at 20-Year Intervals Has Died In Office!" In February 1960, journalist Ed Koterba noted that "The next President of the United States will face an eerie curse that for more than a century has hung over every chief executive elected in a year ending with zero." Both of their hints at the elected president's death came true, with Franklin D. Roosevelt's death in 1945 and John F. Kennedy's assassination in 1963.

The first written account to refer to the source of the curse was an article by Lloyd Shearer in 1980 in Parade magazine. It is claimed that when Tecumseh was killed in a later battle, Tenskwatawa set a curse against Harrison.

Running for re-election in 1980, President Jimmy Carter was asked about the curse at a campaign stop in Dayton, Ohio, on October 2 of that year while taking questions from the crowd. A high school student asked Carter if he was concerned about "predictions that every 20 years or election years ending in zero, the President dies in office." Carter replied, "I've seen those predictions. [...] I'm not afraid. If I knew it was going to happen, I would go ahead and be President and do the best I could till the last day I could." He failed to win a second term but later became the oldest former president at 100 years old, dying at that age on December 29, 2024.

Since the assassination of John F. Kennedy in 1963, no president has died in office. Ronald Reagan was shot and wounded two months after his 1981 inauguration. Days after Reagan survived the shooting, columnist Jack Anderson wrote "Reagan and the Eerie Zero Factor" in The Daily Intelligencer and asserted that the 40th president either had disproved the superstition or had nine lives. As the oldest man to be elected president at that time, Reagan also survived surgery in 1985. First Lady Nancy Reagan was reported to have hired psychics and astrologers to try to protect her husband from the effects of the curse. Reagan left office in 1989 and ultimately died from natural causes in 2004. He was 93 years old and had survived his presidency by 15 years.

Elected in 2000, George W. Bush also survived two terms in office. In 2005, a live grenade was thrown at him but failed to explode. Bush left office in 2009 and is currently living.

Joe Biden, elected in 2020, served a single term. Biden's presidency ended without incident, casting further doubt on the validity of the supposed curse. He left office in 2025 and is currently living.

The only one of the eight presidents who died in office who was not elected in a year covered by the curse was Zachary Taylor, elected in 1848, but died in 1850, a year ending in zero. Like Reagan and Bush, many presidents outside the curse have faced assassination attempts or medical problems.

== Applicable presidents ==
| Elected | Term of election | President | Death | Term of death | Cause of death |
|---|---|---|---|---|---|
| 1840 | First | William Henry Harrison | April 4, 1841 | First | Typhoid fever |
| 1860 | First | Abraham Lincoln | April 15, 1865 | Second | Assassinated |
| 1880 | First | James A. Garfield | September 19, 1881 | First | Assassinated |
| 1900 | Second | William McKinley | September 14, 1901 | Second | Assassinated |
| 1920 | First | Warren G. Harding | August 2, 1923 | First | Heart attack |
| 1940 | Third | Franklin D. Roosevelt | April 12, 1945 | Fourth | Cerebral hemorrhage |
| 1960 | First | John F. Kennedy | November 22, 1963 | First | Assassinated |
| 1980 | First | Ronald Reagan | June 5, 2004 (did not die in office) | —N/a | Pneumonia, complicated by Alzheimer's disease |
| 2000 | First | George W. Bush | Living (did not die in office) | —N/a | —N/a |
| 2020 | First | Joe Biden | Living (did not die in office) | —N/a | —N/a |

== Commentary ==
Snopes rates the claim that a "death curse threatens U.S. presidents elected in years evenly divisible by twenty" a legend and undocumented folktale not supported by actual records of Tecumseh cursing the "Great White Fathers" after his defeat at Tippecanoe. Multiple sources have called the failure of the curse after 1960 a disproof of a curse as an explanation for the deaths in office.

According to Timothy Redmond of the Skeptical Inquirer, the supposed curse demonstrates a number of logical fallacies, including confusing correlation with causation, cherry picking, and moving the goalposts. In layman's terms, out of many unlikely eerie patterns, at least one of those hypothetical patterns is likely to come true.

In 2009, Steve Friess of Slate sought to interview notable presidential historians and security experts such as Michael Beschloss, Doris Kearns Goodwin, and Richard A. Clarke on the alleged curse, but none of them returned his calls. Michael S. Sherry, an American history professor at Northwestern University, replied, "I doubt I have anything profound to say about this particular factoid, odd though it is."

== See also ==
- Acting President of the United States
- List of presidents of the United States who died in office
- List of presidents of the United States by date of death
- Similar curses and regularities:
  - Bald–hairy, a regularity observed in the sequence of Russian rulers since 1825.
  - Fat pope, thin pope
  - Kennedy curse
  - Lincoln–Kennedy coincidences urban legend
  - Redskins Rule
  - Second-term curse
