= List of presidents of the United States who died in office =

Presidents of the United States who died in office
William Henry Harrison; April 4, 1841	Zachary Taylor; July 9, 1850	Abraham Lincoln; April 15, 1865
James A. Garfield; September 19, 1881		William McKinley; September 14, 1901
Warren G. Harding; August 2, 1923	Franklin D. Roosevelt; April 12, 1945	John F. Kennedy; November 22, 1963

Since the office was established in 1789, 45 individuals have served as president of the United States. (Note: While there have been 47 presidencies, only 45 individuals have served as president. Two presidents have served non-consecutive terms: and thus, by convention, Grover Cleveland is numbered as both the 22nd and 24th U.S. president, and Donald Trump is numbered as both the 45th and 47th U.S. president.) Of these, eight have died in office, of whom four were assassinated and four died of natural causes. In each of these instances, the vice president has succeeded to the presidency. This practice is now governed by Section One of the Twenty-fifth Amendment to the United States Constitution, ratified in 1967, which declares that, "the Vice President shall become President" if the president is removed from office, dies, or resigns. The initial authorization for this practice was provided by Article II, Section 1, Clause 6, of the U.S. Constitution. (Note: In Case of the Removal of the President from Office, or of his Death, Resignation or Inability to discharge the Powers and Duties of the said Office, the Same shall devolve on the Vice President, ...)

The first incumbent U.S. president to die was William Henry Harrison, on April 4, 1841, only one month after Inauguration Day. He died from complications of what at the time was believed to be pneumonia. The second U.S. president to die in office, Zachary Taylor, died on July 9, 1850, from acute gastroenteritis. Abraham Lincoln was the third U.S. president to die in office, and was the first to be assassinated. He was shot by John Wilkes Booth on the night of April 14, 1865, and died the following morning. Sixteen years later, on July 2, 1881, James A. Garfield was shot by Charles J. Guiteau, surviving for 79 days before dying on September 19, 1881.

On September 14, 1901, William McKinley died, eight days after being shot by Leon Czolgosz. Next, Warren G. Harding suffered a heart attack, and died on August 2, 1923. On April 12, 1945, Franklin D. Roosevelt (who had just begun his fourth term in office) collapsed and died as a result of a cerebral hemorrhage. The most recent U.S. president to die in office was John F. Kennedy, who was shot by Lee Harvey Oswald on November 22, 1963, in Dallas, Texas.

== April 4, 1841: William Henry Harrison ==
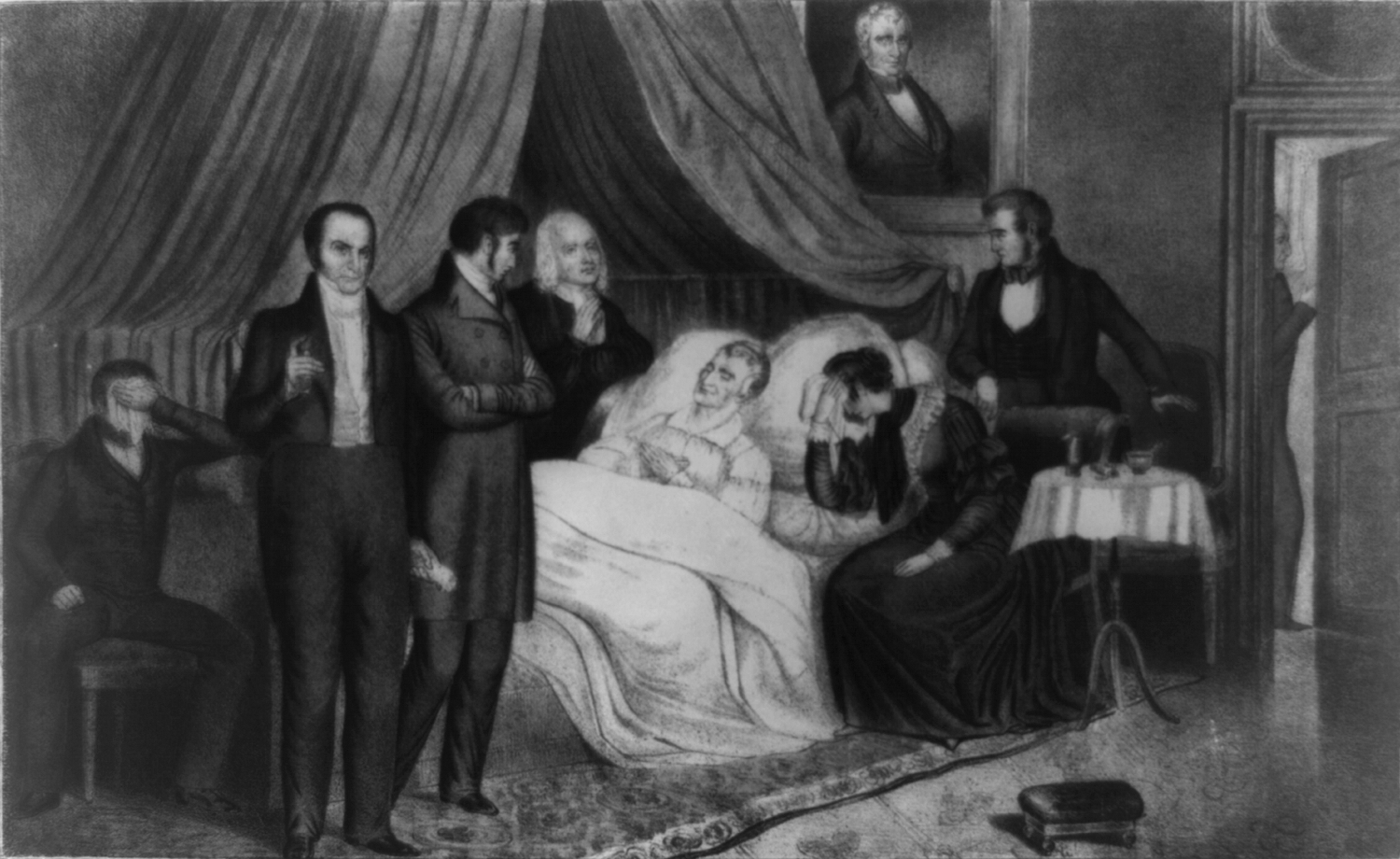
Print depicting William Henry Harrison on his deathbed surrounded by a clergyman, a physician, family members and administration officials

On March 26, 1841, William Henry Harrison became ill with a cold after being caught in a torrential downpour without cover. His symptoms grew progressively worse over the ensuing two days, at which time a team of doctors was called in to treat him. After making a diagnosis of right lower lobe pneumonia, they proceeded to place heated suction cups on his bare torso and to administer a series of bloodlettings, to supposedly draw out the disease. When those procedures failed to bring about improvement, the doctors treated him with ipecac, castor oil, calomel, and finally with a boiled mixture of crude petroleum and Virginia snakeroot. All this only weakened Harrison further.

Initially, no official announcement was made concerning Harrison's illness, which, the longer he remained out of public view, fueled public speculation and concern. By the end of the month large crowds were gathering outside the White House, holding vigil while awaiting any news about the president's condition. On the evening of April 4, 1841, nine days after becoming ill, and exactly one month after his inauguration, Harrison died at age 68. His last words were to his attending doctor, though assumed to be directed at Vice President John Tyler:

Sir, I wish you to understand the true principles of the government. I wish them carried out. I ask nothing more.

A 30-day period of mourning commenced following the president's death. Various public ceremonies, modeled after European royal funeral practices, were held. An invitation-only funeral service was also held, on April 7, in the East Room of the White House, after which Harrison's coffin was brought to Congressional Cemetery in Washington, D.C., where it was placed in a temporary receiving vault.

That June, Harrison's body was transported by train and river barge to North Bend, Ohio. Then, on July 7, 1841, the nation's 9th president was buried in a family tomb at the summit of Mt. Nebo, overlooking the Ohio River – the William Henry Harrison Tomb State Memorial.

Harrison's death sparked a brief constitutional crisis regarding succession to the presidency, as the U.S. Constitution was unclear as to whether Vice President Tyler should assume the office of president or merely execute the duties of the vacant office as acting president. Tyler claimed a constitutional mandate to carry out the full powers and duties of the presidency and took the presidential oath of office, setting the Tyler Precedent for an orderly transfer of presidential power when a president leaves office intra-term.

Coincidentally, all but one of the presidents who later died in office had, like Harrison, won a presidential election in a year ending in a zero (1840 through 1960). This pattern of tragedies came to be known as the Curse of Tippecanoe, or the Curse of Tecumseh, the name of the Shawnee leader against whom Harrison fought in the 1811 Battle of Tippecanoe. Also sometimes referred to as the Zero Factor legend, the pattern was disrupted by Ronald Reagan, who survived an assassination attempt in 1981 (69 days after taking office) and lived to complete two full terms.

== July 9, 1850: Zachary Taylor ==
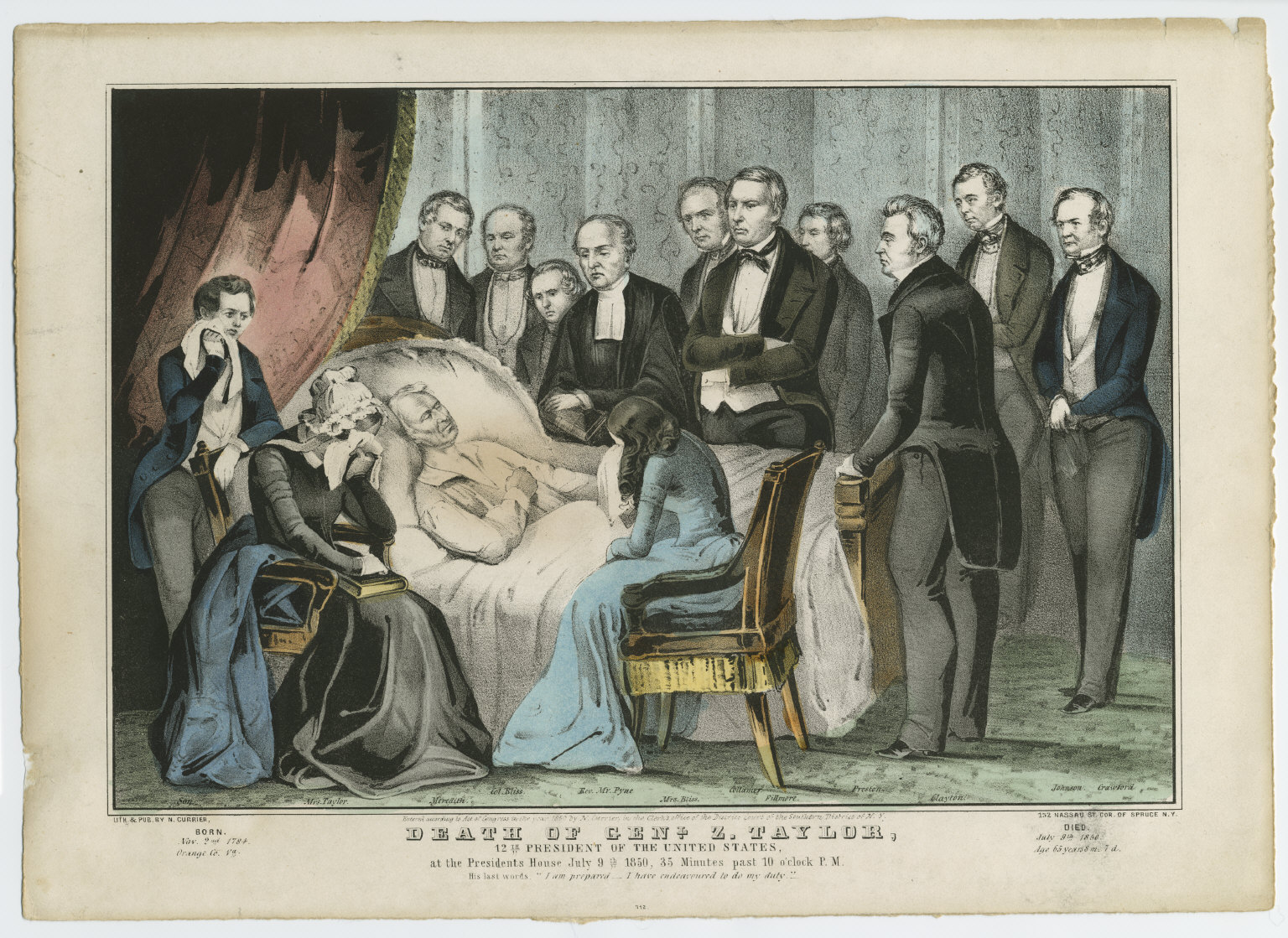
Print depicting the death of Zachary Taylor

Zachary Taylor was known to have consumed copious amounts of ice water, cold milk, green apples, and cherries on July 4, 1850, after attending holiday celebrations and the laying of the cornerstone of the Washington Monument. That same evening, he became severely ill with an unknown digestive ailment. Doctors used popular treatments of the time. On the morning of July 9, the president asked his wife Margaret not to grieve saying:

I have always done my duty, I am ready to die. My only regret is for the friends I leave behind me.

Taylor died late that evening, five days after becoming ill, at age 65. Contemporary reports listed the cause of death as "bilious diarrhea or a bilious cholera." He was succeeded by Vice President Millard Fillmore.

Taylor's funeral took place on July 13, and like Harrison's nine years earlier, was held in the East Room of the White House. Afterward, an estimated 100,000 people gathered along the funeral route to Congressional Cemetery where his coffin was placed temporarily in the Public Vault; that October it was transported to Louisville, Kentucky. On November 1, 1850, Taylor was buried in his family's burial ground on the Taylor estate, Springfield, which became the Zachary Taylor National Cemetery.

Almost immediately after his death, rumors began to circulate that he had been poisoned by pro-slavery Southerners, and various conspiracy theories persisted into the late-20th century. The cause of Taylor's death was definitively established in 1991, when his remains were exhumed and an autopsy conducted by Kentucky's chief medical examiner. Subsequent neutron activation analysis conducted at Oak Ridge National Laboratory revealed no evidence of poisoning, as arsenic levels were too low. The analysis concluded Taylor had contracted cholera morbus (acute gastroenteritis), as Washington had open sewers, and his food or drink may have been contaminated.

== April 15, 1865: Abraham Lincoln ==
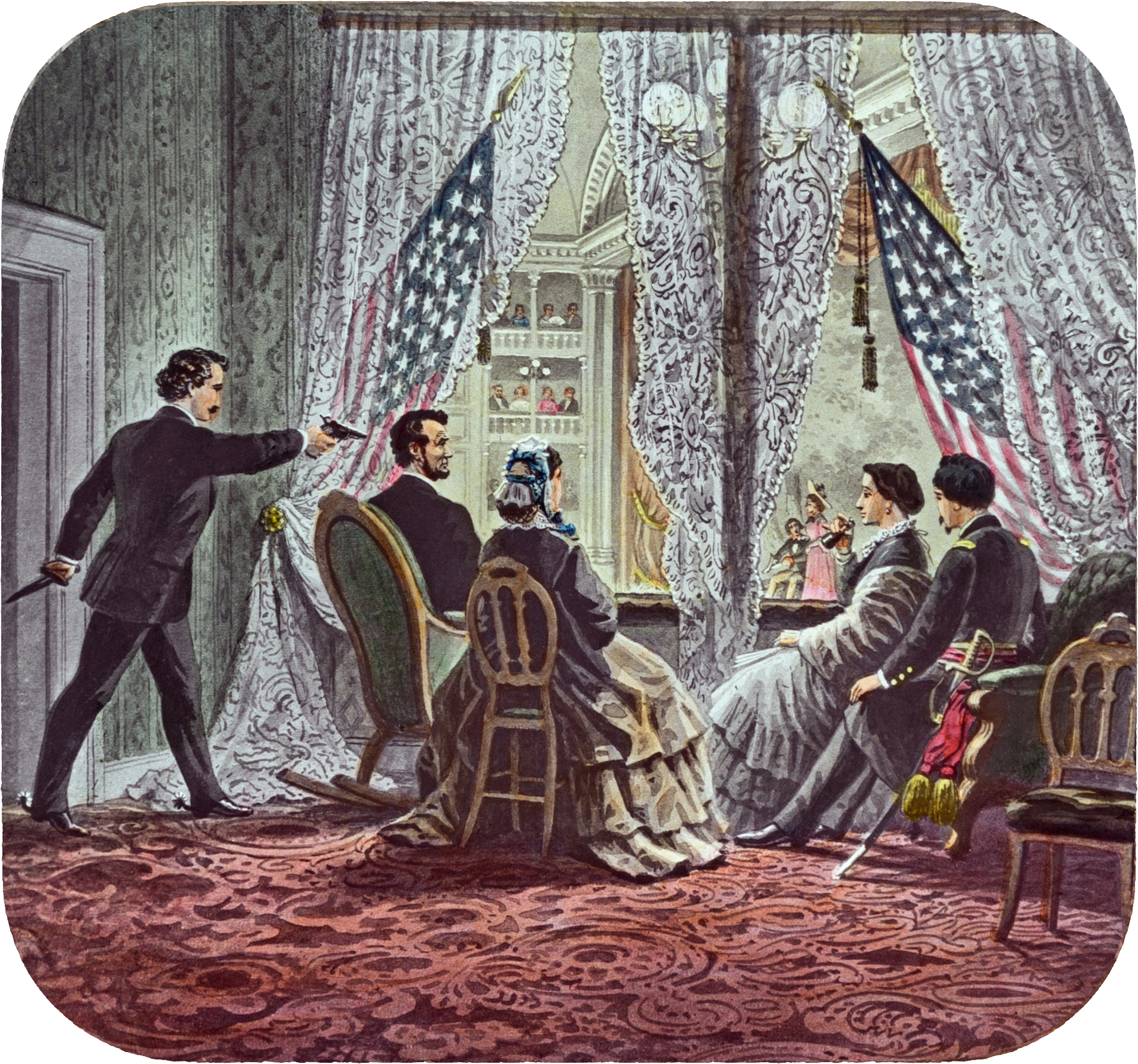
Depiction of John Wilkes Booth (far left) preparing to shoot Abraham Lincoln; Mary Todd Lincoln, Clara Harris, and Henry Rathbone are with the president

The assassination of Abraham Lincoln took place on Good Friday, April 14, 1865, as the Civil War was drawing to a close. He died the following morning at the age of 56. The assassination occurred five days after General Robert E. Lee and the Army of Northern Virginia surrendered to General Ulysses S. Grant and the Army of the Potomac following the Battle of Appomattox Court House. Lincoln was the first American president to be killed by an assassin. (The first U.S. president to be confronted by a would-be assassin was Andrew Jackson 30 years earlier, in January 1835.)

The assassination of President Lincoln was planned and carried out by the well-known stage actor John Wilkes Booth, a Confederate sympathizer, vehement in his denunciation of Lincoln, and a strong opponent of the abolition of slavery in the United States. Booth and a group of co-conspirators originally plotted to kidnap Lincoln, but later planned to kill him, Vice President Andrew Johnson, and Secretary of State William H. Seward in a bid to help the Confederacy's cause. Johnson's would-be-assassin, George Atzerodt did not carry out his part of the plan, and Johnson succeeded Lincoln as president while Lewis Powell only managed to wound Seward.

Lincoln was shot once in the back of his head while watching the play Our American Cousin with his wife Mary Todd Lincoln at Ford's Theatre in Washington, D.C., on the night of April 14, 1865. An army surgeon who happened to be at Ford's, Doctor Charles Leale, assessed Lincoln's wound as mortal. The unconscious president was then carried across the street from the theater to the Petersen House, where he remained in a coma for eight hours before dying the following morning.

Within two weeks of the manhunt for Lincoln's killers, on April 26, 1865, Booth and David Herold were caught in a tobacco barn in Port Conway, Virginia. While Herold surrendered, Booth was shot to death by Boston Corbett, a Union Corporal.

A three-week series of official functions were held following the president's death. He lay in state in the East Room of the White House which was open to the public on April 18. A funeral service was held the next day, and then the coffin was transported in a procession down Pennsylvania Avenue to the United States Capitol, where a ceremonial burial service was held in the rotunda. After lying in state at the Capitol, Lincoln's remains were transported by train to Springfield, Illinois, for burial. He was interred on May 4, 1865, at Oak Ridge Cemetery in Springfield – the Lincoln Tomb State Historic Site since 1895.

== September 19, 1881: James A. Garfield ==
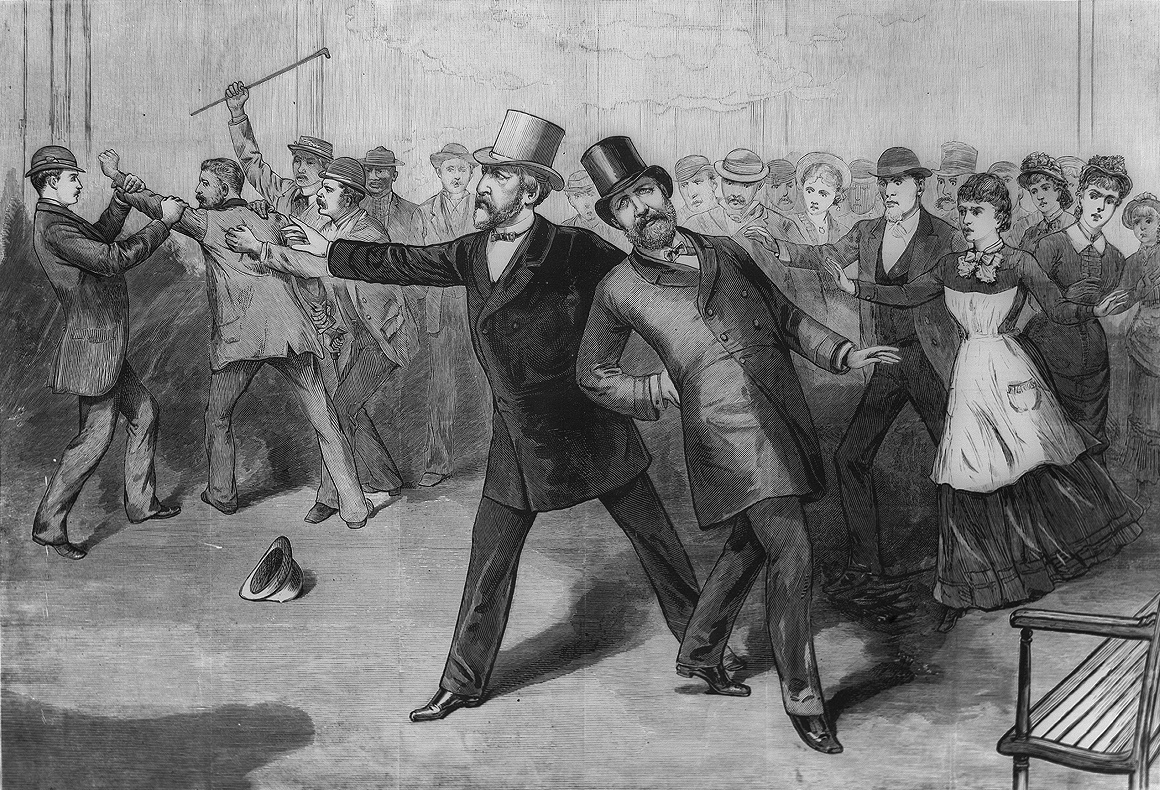
An engraving, published in Frank Leslie's Illustrated Newspaper, of President Garfield after being shot by Charles J. Guiteau; Secretary of State James G. Blaine is with the president.

The assassination of James A. Garfield happened in Washington, D.C., on July 2, 1881. Garfield was shot by Charles J. Guiteau at 9:30 a.m., less than four months into his term as the nation's 20th president. He died 11 weeks later on September 19, 1881, at the age of 49. Vice President Chester A. Arthur succeeded him as president. Garfield was scheduled to leave Washington on July 2, 1881, for his summer vacation. On that day, Guiteau lay in wait for the president at the Baltimore and Potomac Railroad station, on the southwest corner of present-day Sixth Street and Constitution Avenue NW, Washington, D.C.

President Garfield came to the Sixth Street Station on his way to his alma mater, Williams College, where he was scheduled to deliver a speech. Garfield was accompanied by two of his sons, James and Harry, and Secretary of State James G. Blaine. Secretary of War Robert Todd Lincoln waited at the station to see the president off. Garfield had no bodyguard or security detail; with the exception of Abraham Lincoln during the Civil War, early U.S. presidents never used any guards.

As President Garfield entered the waiting room of the station, Guiteau stepped forward and pulled the trigger from behind at point-blank range. "My God, what is that?!" Garfield cried out, flinging up his arms. Guiteau fired again and Garfield collapsed. One bullet grazed Garfield's shoulder; the other hit him in the back, passing the first lumbar vertebra but missing the spinal cord before coming to rest behind his pancreas.

Garfield, conscious but in shock, was carried to an upstairs floor of the train station. Lincoln sent for D.C. Bliss, a prominent Washington physician, who soon arrived and examined Garfield's wounds several times, probing for the bullet that remained lodged in the president's body with his fingers and metal probes. Two additional doctors were summoned, and they also probed the entry wound. Eventually there were about twenty people in the room, including at least ten physicians. As Garfield was being cared for, Lincoln, thinking back to the death of his father, said "How many hours of sorrow I have passed in this town."

Garfield was carried back to the White House. Although doctors told him that he would not survive the night, the president remained conscious and alert. The next morning his vital signs were good and doctors began to hope for recovery. A long vigil began, with Garfield's doctors issuing regular bulletins that the American public followed closely throughout the summer of 1881. His condition fluctuated. Fevers came and went. Garfield struggled to keep down solid food and spent most of the summer eating little, and that only liquids.

Garfield had been a regular visitor to the shore town of Long Branch, New Jersey, one of the nation's premier summer vacation spots until World War I. In early September, it was decided to bring him to Elberon, a quiet beach town just to the south of Long Branch, in hopes that the beach air would help him recover. When they heard that the president was being brought to their town, local citizens built more than half a mile of tracks in less than 24 hours, enabling Garfield to be brought directly to the door of the oceanfront Franklyn cottage, rather than being moved by carriage from the local Elberon train station. However, Garfield died 12 days later. A granite marker on Garfield Road identifies the former site of the cottage, which was demolished in 1950. Throughout the five-month drama, anxious Americans across the country were kept informed of developments by the news media. The publisher of Frank Leslie's Illustrated Newspaper, Miriam Leslie, was especially quick to publish fully illustrated accounts of key moments, from Garfield's shooting to the embalming of his body.

Chester Arthur was at his home in New York City on the night of September 19, when word came that Garfield had died. After first getting the news, Arthur said "I hope—my God, I do hope it is a mistake." But confirmation by telegram came soon after. Arthur took the presidential oath of office, administered by a New York Supreme Court judge, then left for Long Branch to pay his respects before traveling on to Washington. Garfield's body was taken to Washington, where it lay in state for two days in the Capitol Rotunda before being taken to Cleveland, where the funeral was held on September 26.

When the tracks that had been hastily built to the Franklyn cottage were later torn up, actor Oliver Byron bought the wooden ties, and had local carpenter William Presley build them into a small tea house, in commemoration of the president. The red & white (originally red, white & blue) "Garfield Tea House" still survives, resting a couple of blocks away from the site of the cottage on the grounds of the Long Branch Historical Museum, a former Episcopal Church. The church is nicknamed "The Church of the Presidents," as it had been attended by, in addition to Garfield, presidents Chester A. Arthur, Ulysses S. Grant, Benjamin Harrison, Rutherford Hayes, William McKinley, and Woodrow Wilson, during their own visits to Long Branch.

== September 14, 1901: William McKinley ==
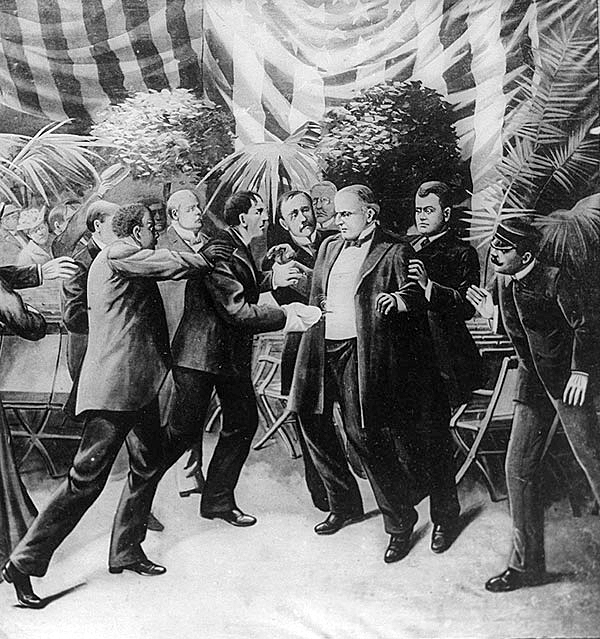
A drawing depicting Leon Czolgosz shooting William McKinley with a concealed revolver

William McKinley was assassinated on September 6, 1901, inside the Temple of Music on the grounds of the Pan-American Exposition in Buffalo, New York. McKinley was shaking hands with the public when Leon Czolgosz, a Polish-American anarchist, shot him. The 58-year-old president died eight days later on September 14 from gangrene caused by the bullet wounds.

McKinley had been elected for a second term in 1900. He enjoyed meeting the public, and was reluctant to accept the security available to his office. The secretary to the president, George B. Cortelyou, feared an assassination attempt would take place during a visit to the Temple of Music, and twice took it off the schedule. McKinley restored it each time.

Czolgosz had lost his job during the economic Panic of 1893 and turned to anarchism, a political philosophy whose adherents had previously killed foreign leaders. Regarding McKinley as a symbol of oppression, Czolgosz felt it was his duty as an anarchist to kill him. Unable to get near McKinley during the earlier part of the presidential visit, Czolgosz shot McKinley twice as the President reached to shake his hand in the reception line at the temple. One bullet grazed McKinley; the other entered his abdomen and was never found.

McKinley initially appeared to be recovering, but took a turn for the worse on September 13 as his wounds became gangrenous, and died early the next morning; Vice President Theodore Roosevelt succeeded him. Roosevelt was hiking near the top of Mt. Marcy, in New York's Adirondack region, when a runner located him to convey the news. After McKinley's murder, for which Czolgosz was put to death in the electric chair, the United States Congress passed legislation to officially charge the Secret Service with the responsibility for protecting the president.

== August 2, 1923: Warren G. Harding ==
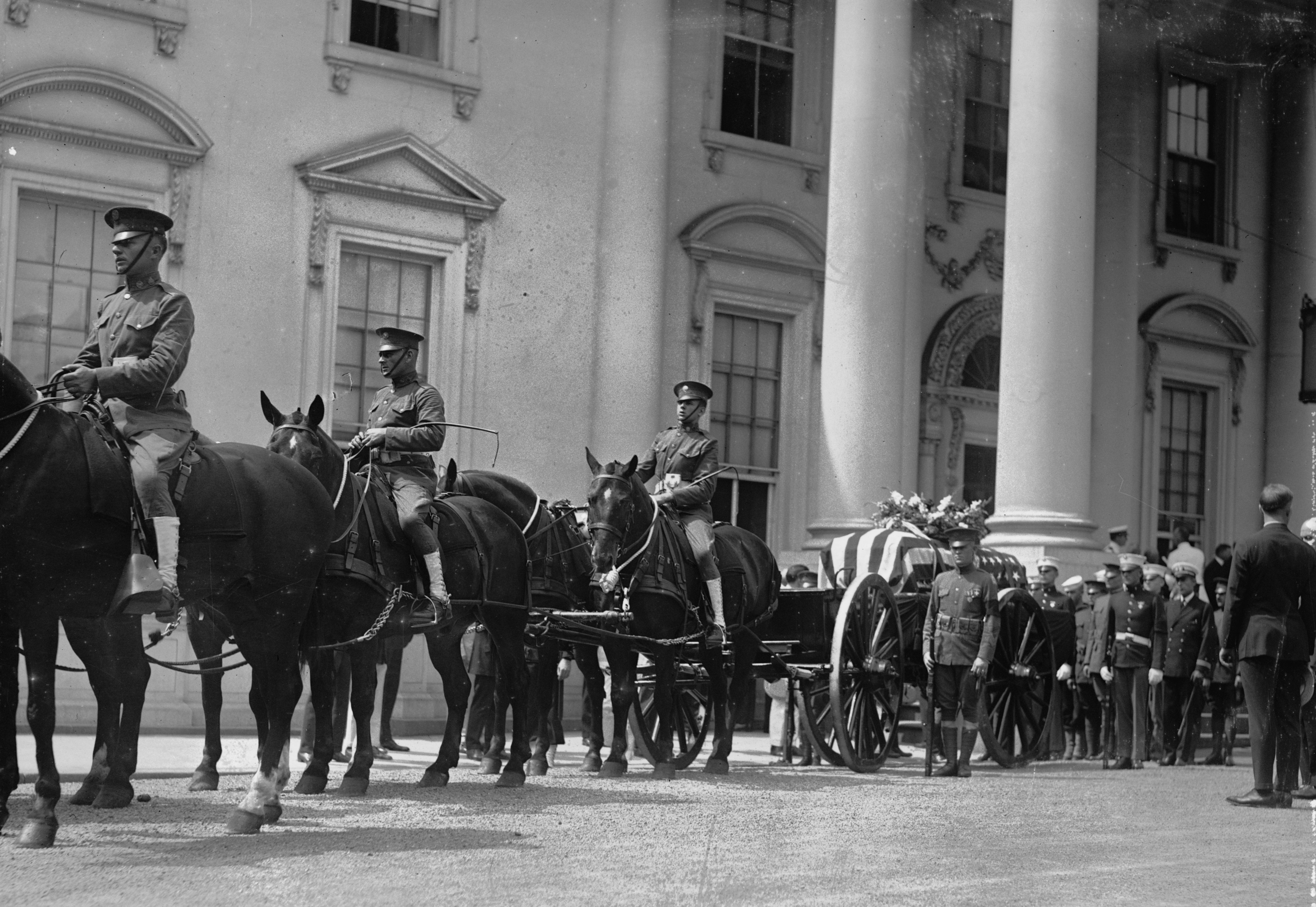
Warren G. Harding's horse-drawn casket in front of the North Portico of the White House

Warren G. Harding died from a sudden heart attack in his hotel suite while visiting San Francisco on the evening of August 2, 1923, at the age of 57. His death quickly led to theories that he had been poisoned or committed suicide. Rumors of poisoning were fueled, in part, by a book called The Strange Death of President Harding by private detective and former Ohio Gang member Gaston Means, who suggested First Lady Florence Harding had poisoned her husband after learning of his infidelity. Mrs. Harding's refusal to allow an autopsy on President Harding only added to the speculation. According to the physicians attending Harding, however, the symptoms in the days prior to his death all pointed to congestive heart failure. Harding's biographer, Samuel H. Adams, concluded that "Warren G. Harding died a natural death which, in any case, could not have been long postponed."

Immediately after President Harding's death, Mrs. Harding returned to Washington, D.C., and briefly stayed in the White House with the new president Calvin Coolidge and first lady. For a month, former first lady Harding gathered and destroyed by fire President Harding's correspondence and documents, both official and unofficial. Upon her return to Marion, Ohio, Mrs. Harding hired a number of secretaries to collect and burn President Harding's personal papers. According to Mrs. Harding, she took these actions to protect her husband's legacy. The remaining papers were held and kept from public view by the Harding Memorial Association in Marion.

== April 12, 1945: Franklin D. Roosevelt ==
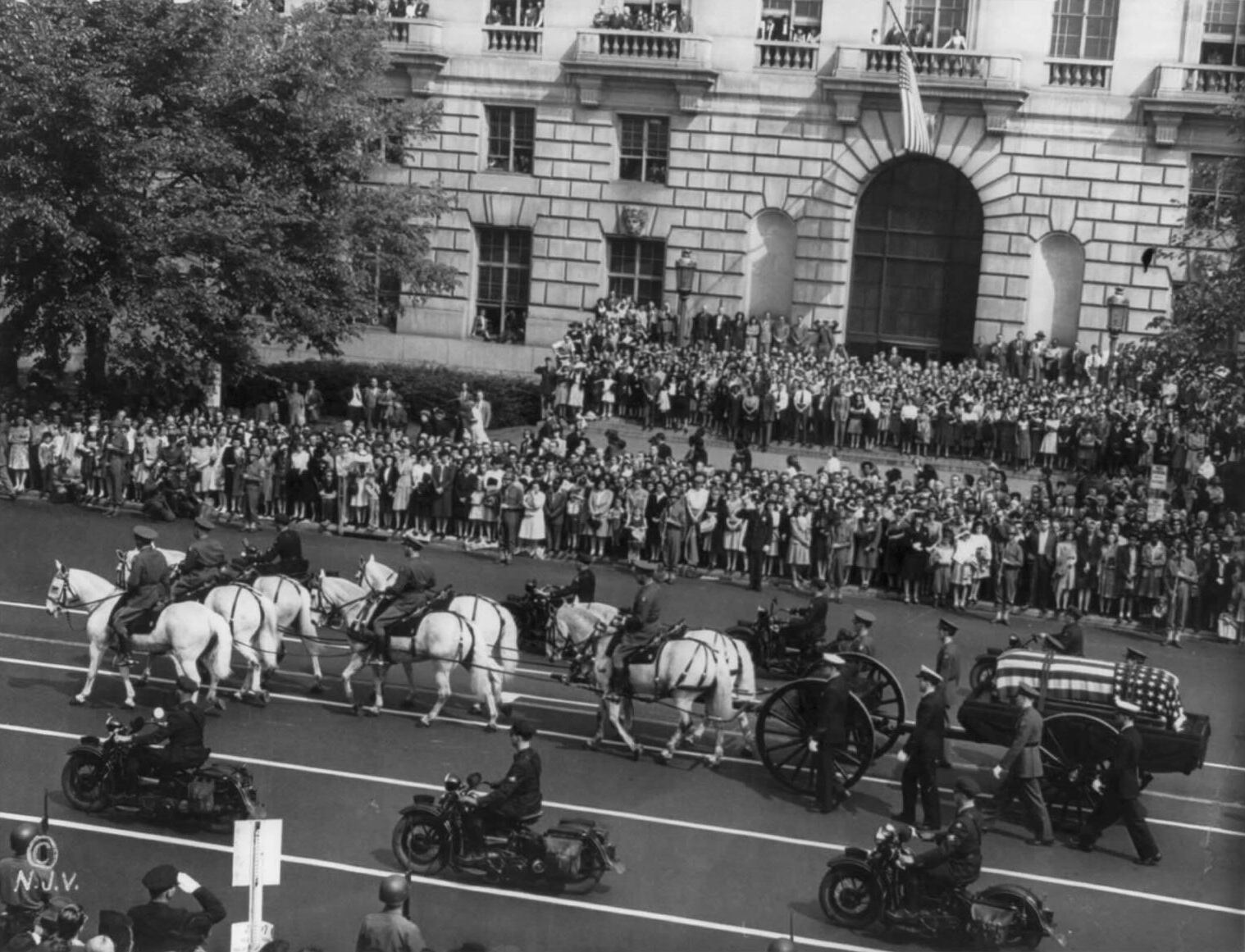
Franklin D. Roosevelt's horse-drawn casket proceeds down Pennsylvania Avenue

On March 29, 1945, Franklin D. Roosevelt went to the Little White House in Warm Springs, Georgia, to rest before his anticipated appearance at the founding conference of the United Nations in late April in San Francisco. At around 1:00 pm on April 12, Roosevelt said, "I have a terrific pain in the back of my head," which were his last words. He then slumped forward in his chair, unconscious, and was carried into his bedroom. The president's attending cardiologist, Howard Bruenn, diagnosed a massive cerebral hemorrhage (stroke). The 63-year-old Roosevelt died a few hours later, without regaining consciousness. As Allen Drury later said, "so ended an era, and so began another." After Roosevelt's death, an editorial in The New York Times declared, "Men will thank God on their knees a hundred years from now that Franklin D. Roosevelt was in the White House."

In his later years at the White House, when Roosevelt was increasingly overworked, his daughter Anna Roosevelt Boettiger had moved in to provide her father companionship and support. Anna had also arranged for her father to meet with his former mistress, the then widowed Lucy Mercer Rutherfurd. A close friend of both Roosevelt and Mercer who was present, Elizabeth Shoumatoff, rushed Mercer away to avoid negative publicity and implications of infidelity. When Eleanor heard about her husband's death, she was also faced with the news that Anna had been arranging these meetings with Mercer and that Mercer had been with Franklin when he died.

On the morning of April 13, Roosevelt's body was placed in a flag-draped coffin and loaded onto the presidential train. After a White House funeral on April 14, Roosevelt was transported back to Hyde Park by train, guarded by four servicemen, one each from the Army, Navy, Marines, and Coast Guard. As was his wish, Roosevelt was buried in the Rose Garden of the Springwood estate, the Roosevelt family home in Hyde Park on April 15. Eleanor died in November 1962 and was buried next to him.

Roosevelt's death was met with shock and grief across the U.S. and around the world. His declining health had not been known to the general public. Roosevelt had been president for more than 12 years, longer than any other person, and had led the country through some of its greatest crises to the impending defeat of Nazi Germany and within sight of the defeat of Japan as well.

Less than a month after his death, on May 8, the war in Europe ended. President Harry S. Truman dedicated Victory in Europe Day and its celebrations to Roosevelt's memory, and kept the flags across the U.S. at half-staff for the remainder of the 30-day mourning period. In doing so, Truman said that his only wish was "that Franklin D. Roosevelt had lived to witness this day."

== November 22, 1963: John F. Kennedy ==
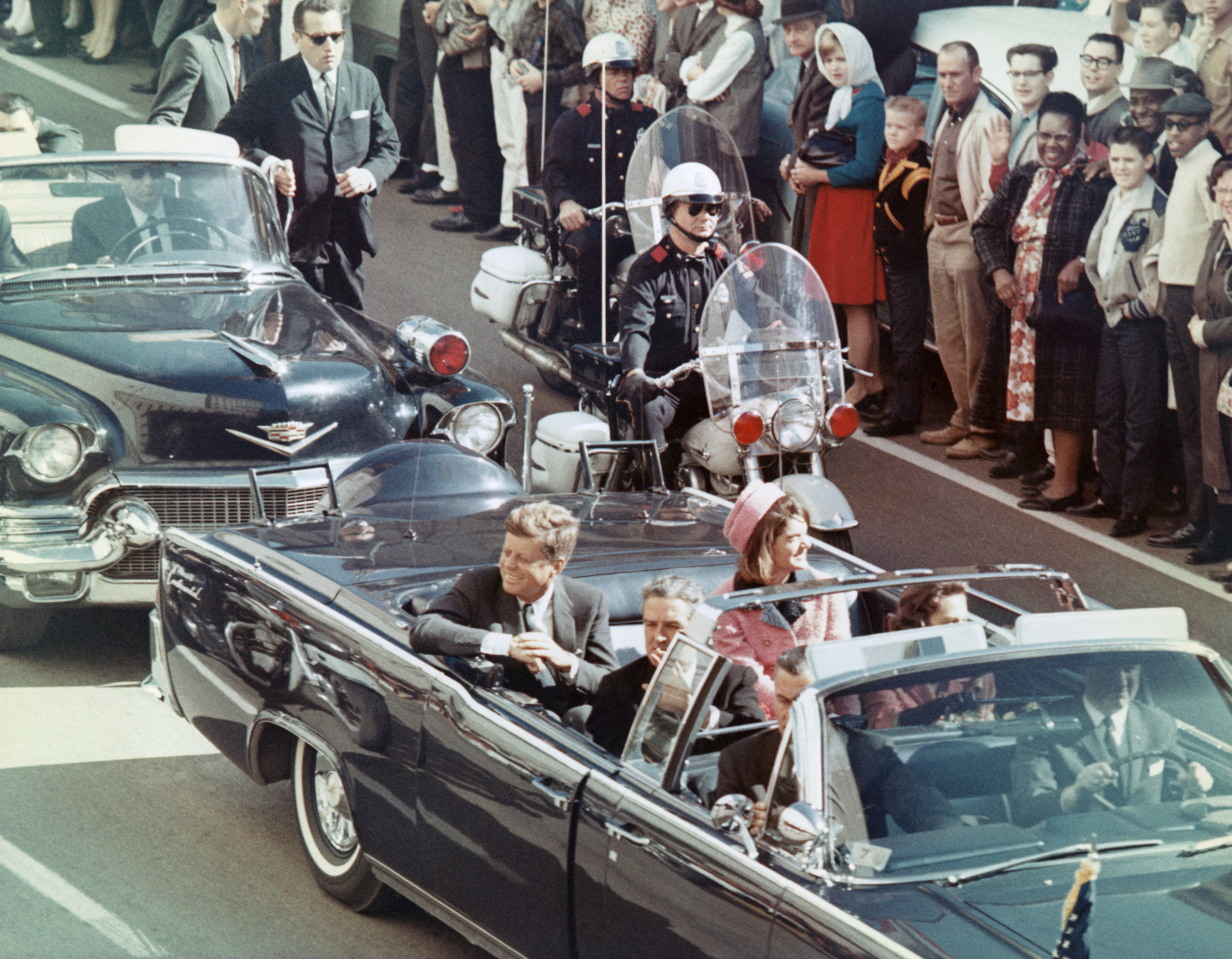
President Kennedy and Jackie Kennedy (seated rear) with Governor Connally and Nellie Connally (seated forward) in the presidential limousine minutes before the assassination

The most recent U.S. president to die in office is John F. Kennedy, who was assassinated on November 22, 1963, in Dallas, Texas. He was fatally shot by Lee Harvey Oswald, who fired three shots from a sixth floor window of the Texas School Book Depository at 12:30 p.m. as the presidential motorcade passed through Dealey Plaza. Riding in the vehicle with the president were First Lady Jackie Kennedy, Texas governor John Connally, and Connally's wife Nellie; Governor Connally was also seriously wounded in the attack. The motorcade rushed to Parkland Memorial Hospital, where Kennedy was pronounced dead about 30 minutes later, at the age of 46. Connally recovered from his injuries.

Vice President Lyndon B. Johnson, who was a few cars behind the president in the motorcade, became U.S. president upon Kennedy's death. He took the presidential oath of office onboard Air Force One as it sat on the runway at Dallas Love Field. Oswald was arrested by the Dallas Police Department that afternoon, and was charged under Texas state law with the murder of Kennedy, as well as that of Dallas policeman J. D. Tippit, who had been fatally shot a short time after the assassination. Two days later, on November 24, 1963, as live television cameras were covering his transfer from the city jail to the county jail, Oswald was fatally shot in the basement of Dallas Police Headquarters by Dallas nightclub operator Jack Ruby. Ruby was convicted of Oswald's murder, though it was later overturned on appeal, and Ruby died in prison in 1967 while awaiting a new trial.

In 1964, after a 10-month investigation into the assassination, the Warren Commission concluded that President Kennedy was assassinated by Lee Harvey Oswald and that Oswald had acted entirely alone. It also concluded that Jack Ruby acted alone when he killed Oswald in police custody. Nonetheless, speculation over "what really happened" on November 22, 1963, in Dallas captured the public imagination during the decades that followed. Polls conducted from 1966 to 2004 found that as many as 80 percent of Americans have suspected that there was a criminal conspiracy or cover-up. Numerous books, films, television specials and websites have examined the assassination in minute detail, and numerous conspiracy theories have been advanced. Parties as varied as the CIA, the Mafia, the Cuban and the Soviet governments, along with Kennedy's successor, Lyndon Johnson, have been identified as Suspect. In an article published prior to the 50th anniversary of Kennedy's assassination, author Vincent Bugliosi estimates that a total of 42 groups, 82 assassins, and 214 people have been accused in conspiracy theories challenging the "lone gunman" theory.

== See also ==
- List of United States presidential assassination attempts and plots
- Curse of Tippecanoe

== Bibliography ==
- Bauer, K. Jack (1985). Zachary Taylor: Soldier, Planter, Statesman of the Old Southwest. Louisiana State University Press. ISBN 0-8071-1237-2.
- Cleaves, Freeman (1939). Old Tippecanoe: William Henry Harrison and His Time. New York, NY: C. Scribner's Sons.
- Leech, Margaret (1959). In the Days of McKinley. New York: Harper and Brothers. pp. 594–600. OCLC 456809.
- McCullough, David (1992). Truman. Simon & Schuster. ISBN 0-671-86920-5.
- Millard, Candice (2011). Destiny of the Republic. Doubleday. ISBN 978-0-385-53500-7.
- Miller, Scott (2011). The President and the Assassin. New York: Random House. pp. 56–60. ISBN 978-1-4000-6752-7.
- Peskin, Allan (1978). Garfield. Kent State University Press. ISBN 0-87338-210-2.
- Vowell, Sarah (2005). Assassination Vacation. Simon and Schuster. ISBN 0-7432-6003-1.
