= Buddy Starcher =

American singer-songwriter

- Born: Oby Edgar Starcher; March 16, 1906
- Origin: Ripley, West Virginia, U.S.
- Died: November 2, 2001 (aged 95) Harrisonburg, Virginia, U.S.
- Genres: Country
- Occupation: Singer-songwriter
- Years active: 1946–1967
- Labels: 4 Star, Boone

Oby Edgar "Buddy" Starcher (March 16, 1906 – November 2, 2001) was an American country singer whose first record releases were in 1946, although he had been performing since his teens, often billed as "The Boy from Down Home".

Born in Ripley, West Virginia, he starred on his own show on WCHS-TV from 1960 to 1966, and ran a record label named B.E.S. (for his initials) during this time. However, he is best known for his spoken word recording entitled "History Repeats Itself", written with Minnie Pearl. Originally released on his own label in 1965, it was re-released on the larger and better distributed Boone Records in 1966. The track recounts uncanny similarities between the assassinations of Abraham Lincoln and John F. Kennedy, accompanied by a musical background featuring "Battle Hymn of the Republic" and "America the Beautiful".

The re-released single hit No. 39 on the US Billboard Hot 100 chart and the album of the same name from which it was drawn peaked at No. 37 on the US Country Albums chart.

His wife, Mary Ann Starcher (née Estes), was also a musician and often appeared with him on his television show.

== Discography ==
=== Albums ===
| Year | Album | US Country | Label |
|---|---|---|---|
| 1962 | Buddy Starcher and His Mountain Guitar | — | Starday |
| 1966 | History Repeats Itself | 37 | Decca |
| 1967 | Just Buddy and His Guitar No. 1 | — | Bluebonnet |
| 1967 | Country Soul and Inspiration | — | Heartwarming |
| 1986 | Me and My Guitar (Bootleg Re-issue of 1967 album for Bluebonnet) | — | Old Homestead |

=== Singles ===
| Year | Single | Chart Positions | | Album |
| Year | Single | US Country | US | Album |
|---|---|---|---|---|
| 1949 | "I'll Still Write Your Name in the Sand" | 8 | — | single only |
| 1966 | "History Repeats Itself" | 2 | 39 | History Repeats Itself |
| 1966 | "Day of Decision" | — | 131 | History Repeats Itself |
