= History Repeats Itself =

1966 single by Buddy Starcher

Single by Buddy Starcher

from the album History Repeats Itself
- B-side: "Sniper's Hill"
- Released: March 1966
- Genre: Country; spoken word
- Label: Boone
- Songwriters: Buddy Starcher, Minnie Pearl
- Producer: Chuck Glaser

Orange vinyl issue
- Special disc jockey record

"History Repeats Itself"

Single by Cab Calloway
- B-side: "After Taxes"
- Released: March 1966
- Genre: Pop
- Label: Boom
- Songwriters: Buddy Starcher, Minnie Pearl
- Producer: Bob Thiele

Cab Calloway singles chronology
"Little Child" (1956)	"History Repeats Itself" (1966)

"History Repeats Itself" is a 1966 narrated song written and recorded by Buddy Starcher. It became his greatest hit, reaching number 39 on the U.S. Billboard Hot 100 and number two on the Country singles chart.

The lyrics recount the Lincoln–Kennedy coincidences urban legend, set to the tune of "Battle Hymn of the Republic" in the beginning, and "America the Beautiful" during the lyrical portion.

== Lyrical content ==
The song begins with the conclusion of the chorus of "Battle Hymn of the Republic." The lyrics recount curious coincidences and parallels (several of them false) between the careers and deaths of Presidents Abraham Lincoln and John F. Kennedy. These had begun attracting attention in the US mainstream press in 1964 (the year after Kennedy's assassination).

Starcher also recorded a "Part 2," as there are too many similarities to be recounted in just one song.

Just a few of the noted similarities shared by both presidents include: Being elected in years ending in '60, both concerned with civil rights issues. Both first ladies lost a child while in the White House. Both presidents were shot in the back of the head on a Friday, in the presence of their wives. Their assassins were born in years ending '39, and both espousing radical ideologies. Their successors were both southern senators named Johnson, both born in years ending in '08.

Several of these similarities are false, for example Booth was born in 1838, while Lee Oswald was born in 1939.

== Cover version ==
"History Repeats Itself" was covered by Cab Calloway, charting concurrently with Starcher's version and debuting on the charts one week later. In 1967 it was also covered in Dutch by Gerard de Vries as "De Geschiedenis Herhaalt Zich".

== Chart history ==
Buddy Starcher original

Chart (1966)	Peak position
U.S. Billboard Hot 100	39
U.S. Hot Country Singles	2
U.S. Cash Box Top 100	40

Cab Calloway cover

Chart (1966)	Peak position
U.S. Billboard Hot 100	89
U.S. Cash Box Top 100	82

== Parody ==
A parody of this recording, "Great Men Repeat Themselves", described purported coincidental similarities between President Lyndon Johnson and the superhero Batman. Both Homer and Jethro and Ben Colder recorded versions of the parody.

== See also ==
- Lincoln–Kennedy coincidences
