= Kennedy curse =

Premature deaths and calamities for Kennedy family

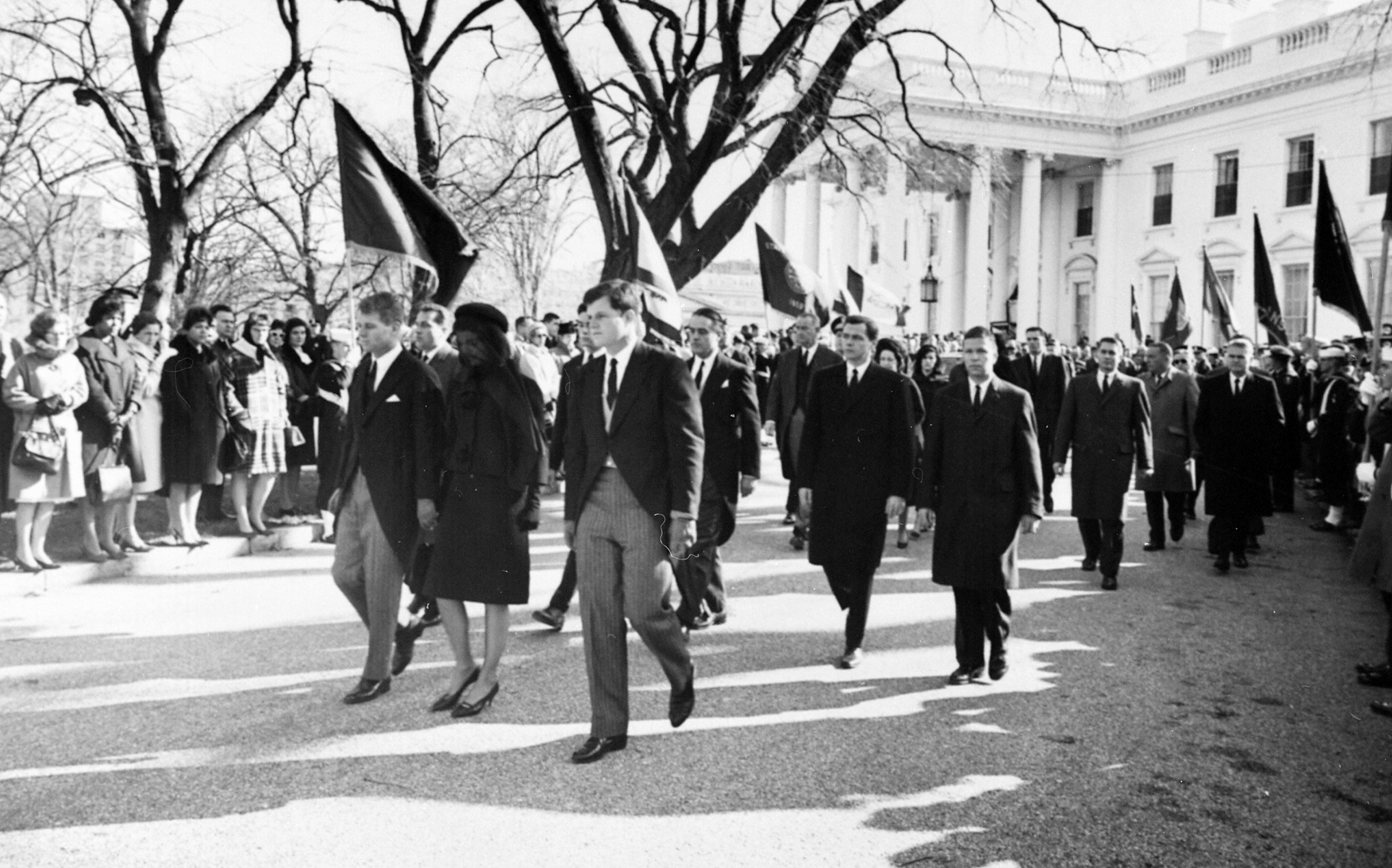
Jacqueline Kennedy, accompanied by her brothers-in-law, Attorney General Robert F. Kennedy and Senator Ted Kennedy, walking from the White House as part of the funeral procession accompanying President John F. Kennedy's casket to St. Matthew’s Cathedral, November 25, 1963.

The Kennedy curse is a series of deaths, accidents, assassinations, and other calamities involving members of the American Kennedy family. (Note: Attributed to multiple sources:) The alleged curse has primarily struck the descendants of businessman Joseph P. Kennedy Sr., but it has also affected family friends, associates, and other relatives. Political assassinations and plane crashes have been the most common manifestations of the "curse". Following the Chappaquiddick incident in 1969, Ted Kennedy said he questioned if "some awful curse did actually hang over all the Kennedys." Skeptics argue that it is not improbable for a large extended family to experience similar events over the course of several generations.

== Chronology ==
Events linked to the alleged curse include:

=== Kennedy deaths ===
- August 12, 1944 – Joseph P. Kennedy Jr., brother of John F. Kennedy, died when the military aircraft he was piloting exploded over East Suffolk, England.
- September 9, 1944 – William Cavendish, Marquess of Hartington, newly wed husband of Kathleen Kennedy, was fatally shot by a German sniper while leading his company near Heppen, Belgium.
- May 13, 1948 – Kathleen "Kick" Kennedy (formally known as Kathleen Cavendish, Marchioness of Hartington) died in a plane crash alongside her lover Peter Wentworth-Fitzwilliam, 8th Earl Fitzwilliam, pilot Peter Townsend and navigator Arthur Freeman near Saint-Bauzile, France.
- October 3, 1955 – Three months after the birth of Ethel Kennedy's (wife of Robert F. Kennedy) fourth child David, her parents, George and Ann Skakel, were both killed in a plane crash in Union City, Oklahoma.
- August 23, 1956 – Arabella Kennedy, daughter of John F. Kennedy, died at birth.
- August 9, 1963 – Patrick Bouvier Kennedy, son of John F. Kennedy, died of infant respiratory distress syndrome two days after his premature birth on August 7 at Otis Air Force Base, Massachusetts.
- November 22, 1963 – 35th U.S. President John F. Kennedy was assassinated in Dallas, Texas while riding in a presidential limousine.
- June 6, 1968 – U.S. senator and Democratic presidential candidate Robert F. Kennedy died of gunshot wounds received the night before in Los Angeles following his victory in the California primary.
- January 23, 1973 – Alexander Onassis, stepson of Jacqueline Kennedy Onassis, died in a hospital as a result of injuries sustained in an air crash at Hellinikon International Airport at the age of 24.
- January 23, 1974 – Athalia Ponsell Lindsley, who dated Joseph P. Kennedy Jr. until his death, was murdered at her home.
- April 25, 1984 – David A. Kennedy, son of Robert F. Kennedy, died of a drug overdose in a Palm Beach, Florida, hotel room.
- November 19, 1988 - Christina Onassis, stepdaughter of Jacqueline Kennedy Onassis, was found dead in a bathtub at the age of 37 in an Argentine mansion where she was staying. An autopsy revealed she died of a heart attack caused by acute pulmonary edema.
- May 19, 1994 – Jacqueline Lee Kennedy Onassis, wife of John F. Kennedy, died of lymphoma that was discovered at a hospital visit after a fall from a horse.
- December 31, 1997 – Michael LeMoyne Kennedy, son of Robert F. Kennedy, died in a skiing accident after crashing into a tree in Aspen, Colorado.
- July 16, 1999 – John F. Kennedy Jr. died with his wife Carolyn Bessette-Kennedy and her sister Lauren Bessette when the plane he was piloting crashed off the coast of Martha's Vineyard, Massachusetts.
- September 16, 2011 – Kara Anne Kennedy, daughter of Ted Kennedy, died at 51 after suffering a heart attack at a health club in Washington, D.C.
- May 16, 2012 – Mary Richardson Kennedy, wife of Robert F. Kennedy Jr., died by suicide on the grounds of her home in Bedford, New York.
- September 26, 2014 - Josephine Ethel Kennedy Kerr dies the day of her birth. She was the granddaughter of Michael Kennedy and the great-granddaughter of Robert F. Kennedy and Ethel Skakel Kennedy (from whom she received her middle name).
- September 4, 2018 – Christopher Kennedy Lawford, son of Patricia Kennedy Lawford, died at 63 of a heart attack after having a medical emergency at a yoga studio in Vancouver, Canada.
- August 1, 2019 – Saoirse Kennedy Hill, granddaughter of Robert F. Kennedy, died of an accidental drug overdose at the Kennedy Compound in Hyannis Port, Massachusetts.
- April 2, 2020 – Maeve Kennedy McKean, granddaughter of Robert F. Kennedy, disappeared with her eight-year-old son, Gideon Joseph Kennedy McKean, during a short canoe trip in Chesapeake Bay. Their bodies were recovered from the bay later that week. Autopsies revealed that both had accidentally drowned in the turbulent and chilly water.
- December 30, 2025 – Tatiana Schlossberg, granddaughter of John F. Kennedy, died at 35 following complications with acute myeloid leukemia. In publicly announcing her diagnosis in the New Yorker a month prior, Schlossberg wrote that "I have added a new tragedy to [my mother's] life, to our family's life, and there's nothing I can do to stop it."
- September 21, 2026 – Kyle Francis Kennedy, granddaughter of Robert F. Kennedy, died at 42 in her home in Westwood, Massachusetts. No cause of death has been publicly announced. Previously in 2020 Kyle had suffered a spinal cord injury that left her paralyzed.

=== Kennedy disabilities ===
- November 1941 – Rosemary Kennedy, age 23, struggled to read and write, and she suffered from mood swings, seizures, and violent outbursts. During birth, Rosemary was deprived of oxygen as her mother and her nurse waited for the doctor to arrive. As she grew older, she became more rebellious, and the family worried she would do something that could tarnish the Kennedy reputation. In an attempt to cure or treat his daughter, Joseph Kennedy secretly arranged for her to undergo a prefrontal lobotomy, which was seen by some as a promising treatment at the time for various mental illnesses. Instead of benefiting Rosemary, the now discredited procedure left her mentally and physically incapacitated. Rosemary remained institutionalized in seclusion, in rural Wisconsin, until her death in 2005. Her family remained distant for most of Rosemary's life, but Eunice Kennedy Shriver, her sister, grew close to her later in life. Eunice went on to found the Special Olympics and the Joseph P. Kennedy Jr. Foundation, which researches developmental and intellectual disabilities.
- November 17, 1973 – Edward M. Kennedy Jr., age 12, had his right leg surgically amputated as a result of bone cancer. He underwent an experimental two-year drug treatment to cure the cancer.
- 2020 – Kyle Kennedy, age 36, was left paralyzed after suffering a severe spinal cord injury, and would die six years later. The injury was described in her obituary as giving Kyle "long-term paralysis, disability and other medical challenges."

=== Other incidents ===
- June 19, 1964 – U.S. senator Ted Kennedy survived a plane crash that killed one of his aides as well as the pilot. The plane was on its way to a Massachusetts Democratic Party state convention in Springfield. The plane crashed in an apple orchard near Southampton, Massachusetts. The senator was pulled from the wreckage by passenger (and fellow senator) Birch Bayh. Kennedy spent five months in a hospital recovering from a broken back, a punctured lung, broken ribs, and internal bleeding. Following the crash, Robert F. Kennedy remarked to aide Ed Guthman: "Somebody up there doesn't like us."
- July 18, 1969 – Ted Kennedy accidentally drove his car off a bridge on Chappaquiddick Island, Massachusetts, resulting in the death of 28-year-old passenger Mary Jo Kopechne. In his televised statement a week later, Ted said that on the night of the incident, he wondered "whether some awful curse did actually hang over all the Kennedys." Ted did not report the accident to the police until the next morning and pled guilty to a charge of leaving the scene of an accident.
- August 13, 1973 – Joseph P. Kennedy II was the driver of a Jeep in Nantucket, Massachusetts, that crashed and left his passenger, Pam Kelley, paralyzed. Fellow passenger and brother David A. Kennedy was injured.
- October 23, 1975 – In London, a bomb exploded under a car belonging to member of Parliament Hugh Fraser, who was hosting Caroline Kennedy. They were about to drive to Kennedy's art class, but had not yet gone out to the car. The explosion killed prominent cancer scientist Gordon Hamilton Fairley and his dog as they walked nearby.
- April 1, 1991 – William Kennedy Smith was arrested and charged with the rape of a young woman at the Kennedy estate in Palm Beach, Florida. The subsequent trial attracted extensive media coverage. Smith was acquitted.
- May 4, 2006 – U.S. congressman Patrick J. Kennedy crashed his automobile while intoxicated into a barricade on Capitol Hill in Washington, D.C., at 2:45 a.m. He later revealed an addiction to prescription medications Ambien and Phenergan and pleaded guilty to driving under the influence of prescription drugs, sentenced to one year probation and a fine of $350.

== See also ==
- Curse of Tippecanoe
- Dead Kennedys
- Lincoln–Kennedy coincidences urban legend
- Second-term curse
- Sedgwick family, another prominent New England family that faced similar experiences
- Von Erich family, an American professional wrestling family that faced similar experiences
