= Bald–hairy =

Russian political joke

Bald–hairy (Russian: лысый — волосатый, romanized: lysyy — volosatyy) is a Russian political joke, an observation that the state leaders' succession is mostly from a bald or balding leader to a hairy one and vice versa. This consistent pattern can be traced back to as early as 1825, when Nicholas I succeeded his late brother Alexander as the emperor of Russia. Nicholas I's son Alexander II formed the first "bald–hairy" pair of the sequence with his father. In Soviet times (for rulers after Lenin), the rule applies to most of the general (first) secretaries of the Communist Party. In relation to the chairmen of the All-Russian Central Executive Committee, the rule is not followed. Additionally, the chairmen of the Presidium of the Supreme Soviet of the Soviet Union do not follow the rule, having more "hairy" leaders than "bald".

== Gallery ==
Bald/balding leaders	Portrait	Hairy leaders	Portrait
Nicholas I (1825–1855)		Alexander II (1855–1881)	
Alexander III (1881–1894)		Nicholas II (1894–1917)	
Vladimir Lenin (1917–1924)		Joseph Stalin (1924–1953)	
Nikita Khrushchev (1953–1964)		Leonid Brezhnev (1964–1982)	
Yuri Andropov (1982–1984)		Konstantin Chernenko (1984–1985)	
Mikhail Gorbachev (1985–1991)		Boris Yeltsin (1991–1999)	
Vladimir Putin (1999–2008)		Dmitry Medvedev (2008–2012)	
Vladimir Putin (2012–)			

== Usage ==
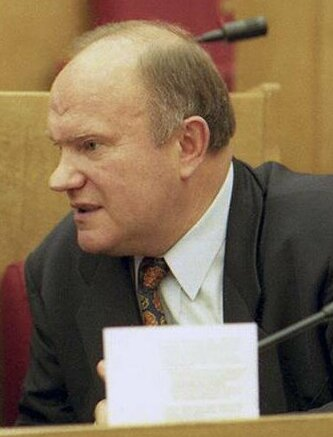
Gennady Zyuganov

In 1987, Vladimir Voinovich wrote a tongue-in-cheek essay "The Struggle of Bald and Hairy" in which he claimed that all bald ones were reformers or revolutionaries, while all hairy ones were reactionaries. From these observations he was trying to predict the politics of Gorbachev's politburo, basing on the bald/hairy ratio in it.

In the middle of the 1990s some humorously predicted that bald Gennady Zyuganov would "inevitably" win the 1996 presidential election and thus replace non-bald Boris Yeltsin. A similar "prediction" was made about Dmitri Medvedev:

"Bald, hairy, bald, hairy, bald, hairy—that's how we elect our leaders," my St Petersburg friend quips when I ask if she voted in the presidential elections. "Think about it: Lenin was bald, Stalin was hairy; Krushchev was bald, Brezhnev was hairy; Gorbachev was bald, Yeltsin was hairy—and Putin is practically bald. Medvedev had to win."

== See also ==
- Fat pope, thin pope
- Curse of Tippecanoe
- List of leaders of Russia
- Medvedev–Putin tandemocracy
- Redskins Rule
- British prime ministers with facial hair
