= Fat pope, thin pope =

Political proverb

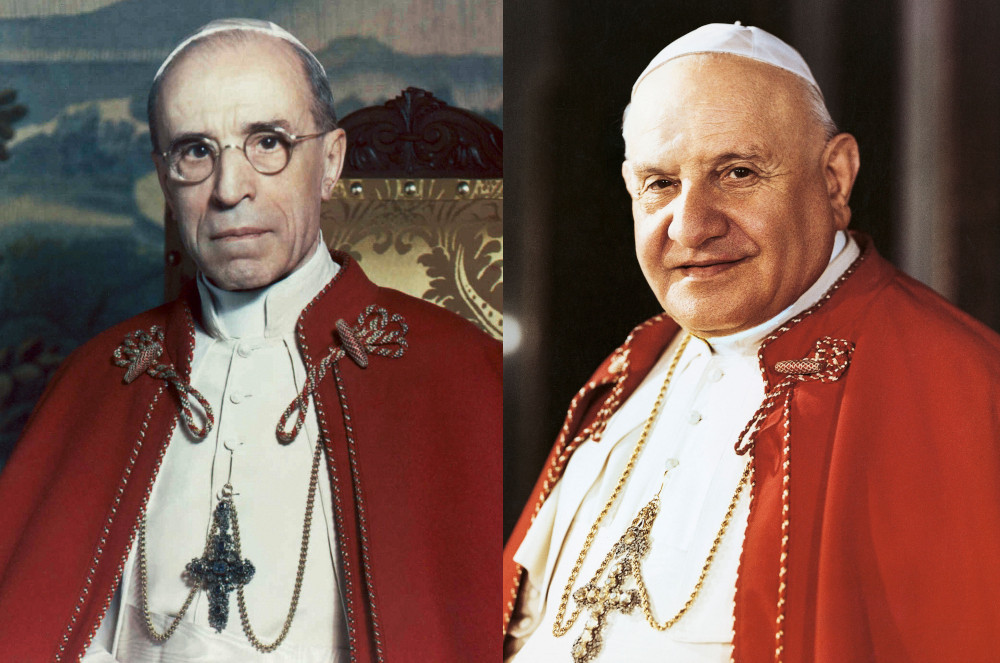
Pius XII and John XXIII, sequential popes who differed both in build and theological emphases

"Fat pope, thin pope" (Italian: papa grasso, papa magro) is an adage in the Catholic Church describing not only a perceived physical trend but also that conclaves tend to counterbalance the preceding pope with one having different theological emphases. The accuracy of the adage has been debated, with both supporters and skeptics. It has also been used in non-papal contexts to refer to other perceived pendulum swings.

== Phrase ==
The adage around papal conclaves has been attributed to Italians and has multiple phrasing, including "Always follow a fat pope with a skinny one" (Italian: Fate sempre seguire un papa grasso a uno magro), "A fat pope follows a thin one" (Italian: A un papa grasso, ne segue uno magro), "A thin pope follows a fat pope" (Italian: A un papa magro, ne segue uno grasso), and "After a fat pope comes a thin pope" (Italian: Dopo un papa grasso, viene uno magro). It describes a perceived tendency for the cardinal electors to choose a candidate who counterbalances the previous pope, as if following a pendulum swing.

In choosing a successor, cardinals are seen to focus on the perceived flaws of the previous pontiff, and select a candidate who remedies those flaws. A "combative" pope may be followed by a more amicable one, and a "politician" followed by a "priest". According to Miles Pattenden, a historian of the Catholic Church at Oxford University, the idea of the saying is cardinals often seek to choose someone who balances out the flaws of the previous pontiff. This phenomenon is especially said to be noticed after particularly long papacies, when the church is ready for change.

== Accuracy ==
Pius IX's reign, marked by a "distrust of modernity", was followed by Leo XIII's focus on a more "activist faith", which was in turn followed by Pius X's fight against modernism. The "austere" and "aristocratic" Pius XII was followed by the "gregarious and seemingly unsophisticated" John XXIII. Similarly, the "progressive" Francis was seen as more left-wing following the "traditionalist" and "introverted" Benedict XVI, who in turn was seen as more right-wing than the preceding "charismatic" John Paul II. Some saw the election of Leo XIV as further confirming the adage, while others argued that Leo was in continuity with Francis.

While the phrase is metaphorical, it has been literally true at times; the portly Pius IX was followed by the skinny Leo XIII, and the "jolly and jowly" John XXIII was preceded by the "gaunt" Pius XII and followed by the "thin" Paul VI. Some commentators observed that the adage is not true at all times or disputed the accuracy of the adage in theological terms. For instance, one argument is that Pius XI in fact continued the policies of Benedict XV, and similarly with Paul VI and John XXIII. Benedict XVI's papacy was also seen by some to be more of the same rather than a change; allegedly, left-wing bishops had assumed that John Paul II's successor would follow a pendulum swing to be more liberal, and were surprised by Benedict XVI's election. Both Father James J. Martin and Colm Flynn of the Catholic television network EWTN dismissed the adage, with Flynn opining that he did not see much difference between Benedict XVI and Francis.

== Other contexts ==
The phrase has been used in a literal way solely about weight, at times incorporating other factors. According to a Roman legend, a fat pope with the letter R in his surname would be followed by a thin pope with no R but at least one letter I in his last name, and who is in turn to be followed by a fat pope with the letter R; this was said to be true from Pius IX to Paul VI. The phrase has also been used to describe the same pendulum phenomenon occurring among Harvard University presidents (with the scientists Charles William Eliot and James B. Conant flanking the humanist A. Lawrence Lowell) and, according to historian Lewis L. Gould, in American presidential executive styles.

== See also ==
- Bald–hairy
- Cyclical theory (United States history)
- Vaticanology
