= List of presidents of the United States by date of death =

Of the 45 people who have served as President of the United States since the office came into existence in 1789, (Note: While by the conventional numbering of U.S. presidents there have been 47 presidents, only 45 individuals have held the office. Grover Cleveland and Donald Trump, the only two to serve non-consecutive terms, are counted twice – Cleveland as the 22nd and the 24th president and Trump as 45th and the 47th).) 40 have died – eight of them while in office. (Note: The five living presidents (in order of birth) are: Joe Biden (November 20, 1942), Donald Trump (June 14, 1946), George W. Bush (July 6, 1946), Bill Clinton (August 19, 1946) and Barack Obama (August 4, 1961).)

The oldest president at the time of death was Jimmy Carter, who died at 100 years, 89 days. John F. Kennedy, assassinated at the age of 46 years, 177 days, was the youngest to have died in office; the youngest to have died by natural causes was James K. Polk, who died of cholera at the age of 53 years, 225 days.

== Presidents in order of death ==
Order of Death	President	Date (Note: Dates of death sort by month and day)	Age	Cause	Place	Presidency (order) dates
1	George Washington	December 14, 1799	67	Acute epiglottitis, bloodletting	Mount Vernon, Virginia	(1st) April 30, 1789 – March 4, 1797
2	Thomas Jefferson	July 4, 1826	83	Toxemia from a kidney infection, uremia from kidney damage, and pneumonia	Charlottesville, Virginia	(3rd) March 4, 1801 – March 4, 1809
3	John Adams	July 4, 1826	90	Heart failure	Quincy, Massachusetts	(2nd) March 4, 1797 – March 4, 1801
4	James Monroe	July 4, 1831	73	Tuberculosis and heart failure	New York City, New York	(5th) March 4, 1817 – March 4, 1825
5	James Madison	June 28, 1836	85	Heart failure	Orange, Virginia	(4th) March 4, 1809 – March 4, 1817
6	William Henry Harrison (Note: Died in office)	April 4, 1841	68	Pneumonia and enteric fever	Washington, D.C.	(9th) March 4, 1841 – April 4, 1841
7	Andrew Jackson	June 8, 1845	78	Chronic dropsy, and heart failure	Nashville, Tennessee	(7th) March 4, 1829 – March 4, 1837
8	John Quincy Adams	February 23, 1848	80	Stroke	Washington, D.C.	(6th) March 4, 1825 – March 4, 1829
9	James K. Polk	June 15, 1849	53	Cholera	Nashville, Tennessee	(11th) March 4, 1845 – March 4, 1849
10	Zachary Taylor	July 9, 1850	65	Gastroenteritis	Washington, D.C.	(12th) March 4, 1849 – July 9, 1850
11	John Tyler	January 18, 1862	71	Stroke	Richmond, Virginia	(10th) April 4, 1841 – March 4, 1845
12	Martin Van Buren	July 24, 1862	79	Asthma and heart failure	Kinderhook, New York	(8th) March 4, 1837 – March 4, 1841
13	Abraham Lincoln	April 15, 1865	56	Gunshot wound (Note: For further information, see Assassination of Abraham Lincoln)	Washington, D.C.	(16th) March 4, 1861 – April 15, 1865
14	James Buchanan	June 1, 1868	77	Respiratory failure, rheumatic gout	Lancaster, Pennsylvania	(15th) March 4, 1857 – March 4, 1861
15	Franklin Pierce	October 8, 1869	64	Inflammation of the stomach, cirrhosis of the liver	Concord, New Hampshire	(14th) March 4, 1853 – March 4, 1857
16	Millard Fillmore	March 8, 1874	74	Stroke	Buffalo, New York	(13th) July 9, 1850 – March 4, 1853
17	Andrew Johnson	July 31, 1875	66	Stroke	Carter's Station, Tennessee	(17th) April 15, 1865 – March 4, 1869
18	James A. Garfield	September 19, 1881	49	Septic shock resulting from medical care of gunshot wound (Note: For further information, see Assassination of James A. Garfield)	Elberon, New Jersey	(20th) March 4, 1881 – September 19, 1881
19	Ulysses S. Grant	July 23, 1885	63	Throat cancer	Moreau, New York	(18th) March 4, 1869 – March 4, 1877
20	Chester A. Arthur	November 18, 1886	57	Stroke	New York City, New York	(21st) September 19, 1881 – March 4, 1885
21	Rutherford B. Hayes	January 17, 1893	70	Heart attack	Fremont, Ohio	(19th) March 4, 1877 – March 4, 1881
22	Benjamin Harrison	March 13, 1901	67	Pneumonia	Indianapolis, Indiana	(23rd) March 4, 1889 – March 4, 1893
23	William McKinley	September 14, 1901	58	Gangrene within gunshot wound (Note: For further information, see Assassination of William McKinley)	Buffalo, New York	(25th) March 4, 1897 – September 14, 1901
24	Grover Cleveland	June 24, 1908	71	Coronary sclerosis, paralysis, or intestinal obstruction	Princeton, New Jersey	(22nd) March 4, 1885 – March 4, 1889 (24th) March 4, 1893 – March 4, 1897
25	Theodore Roosevelt	January 6, 1919	60	Coronary occlusion by a blood clot (assumed)	Oyster Bay, New York	(26th) September 14, 1901 – March 4, 1909
26	Warren G. Harding	August 2, 1923	57	Heart attack	San Francisco, California	(29th) March 4, 1921 – August 2, 1923
27	Woodrow Wilson	February 3, 1924	67	Stroke	Washington, D.C.	(28th) March 4, 1913 – March 4, 1921
28	William Howard Taft	March 8, 1930	72	Heart disease	Washington, D.C.	(27th) March 4, 1909 – March 4, 1913
29	Calvin Coolidge	January 5, 1933	60	Heart attack	Northampton, Massachusetts	(30th) August 2, 1923 – March 4, 1929
30	Franklin D. Roosevelt	April 12, 1945	63	Cerebral hemorrhage	Warm Springs, Georgia	(32nd) March 4, 1933 – April 12, 1945
31	John F. Kennedy	November 22, 1963	46	Gunshot wound (Note: For further information, see Assassination of John F. Kennedy)	Dallas, Texas	(35th) January 20, 1961 – November 22, 1963
32	Herbert Hoover	October 20, 1964	90	Internal hemorrhage, upper gastrointestinal bleeding, strained vascular systems	New York City, New York	(31st) March 4, 1929 – March 4, 1933
33	Dwight D. Eisenhower	March 28, 1969	78	Heart failure	Washington, D.C.	(34th) January 20, 1953 – January 20, 1961
34	Harry S. Truman	December 26, 1972	88	Minor lung congestion, organ failures, cardiovascular system collapse, hypotension, pneumonia	Kansas City, Missouri	(33rd) April 12, 1945 – January 20, 1953
35	Lyndon B. Johnson	January 22, 1973	64	Heart attack	Stonewall, Texas	(36th) November 22, 1963 – January 20, 1969
36	Richard Nixon	April 22, 1994	81	Stroke, paralysis, swelling of the brain	New York City, New York	(37th) January 20, 1969 – August 9, 1974 (Note: Resigned from office)
37	Ronald Reagan	June 5, 2004	93	Alzheimer's disease, pneumonia	Los Angeles, California	(40th) January 20, 1981 – January 20, 1989
38	Gerald Ford	December 26, 2006	93	Arteriosclerotic cerebrovascular disease, diffuse arteriosclerosis	Rancho Mirage, California	(38th) August 9, 1974 – January 20, 1977
39	George H. W. Bush	November 30, 2018	94	Parkinson's disease	Houston, Texas	(41st) January 20, 1989 – January 20, 1993
40	Jimmy Carter	December 29, 2024	100	Heart failure	Plains, Georgia	(39th) January 20, 1977 – January 20, 1981

Map denoting where each of the 40 deceased presidents of the United States died
Presidents that died in New York City (4): Monroe, Arthur, Hoover, Nixon
Presidents that died in Washington, D.C. (7): J.Q. Adams, W.H. Harrison, Taylor, Lincoln, Taft, Wilson, Eisenhower

== Died same day, date, year, age ==
=== Same day ===
- July 4, 1826: Thomas Jefferson at 12:50 p.m., and John Adams at 6:20 p.m.

=== Same date ===
- March 8: Millard Fillmore in 1874 and William Howard Taft in 1930
- July 4: John Adams and Thomas Jefferson in 1826, and James Monroe in 1831
- December 26: Harry S. Truman in 1972 and Gerald Ford in 2006

=== Same calendar year ===
- 1826: Thomas Jefferson and John Adams on July 4
- 1862: John Tyler and Martin Van Buren, on January 18 and July 24, respectively
- 1901: Benjamin Harrison and William McKinley, on March 13 and September 14, respectively

=== Same age (rounded down to nearest year) ===
- 93: Gerald Ford and Ronald Reagan
- 90: John Adams and Herbert Hoover
- 78: Andrew Jackson and Dwight D. Eisenhower
- 71: John Tyler and Grover Cleveland
- 67: George Washington, Benjamin Harrison, and Woodrow Wilson
- 64: Franklin Pierce and Lyndon B. Johnson
- 63: Ulysses S. Grant and Franklin D. Roosevelt
- 60: Theodore Roosevelt and Calvin Coolidge
- 57: Chester A. Arthur and Warren G. Harding

== Died before multiple predecessors ==
William Henry Harrison (L), Abraham Lincoln (M), and John F. Kennedy (R) were each outlived by three of their predecessors, more than any other U.S. president

9th president William Henry Harrison (died April 4, 1841)

- 4 years, 65 days before 7th president Andrew Jackson (died June 8, 1845)
- 6 years, 325 days before 6th president John Quincy Adams (died February 23, 1848)
- 21 years, 111 days before 8th president Martin Van Buren (died July 24, 1862)

11th president James K. Polk (died June 15, 1849)

- 12 years, 217 days before 10th president John Tyler (died January 18, 1862)
- 13 years, 39 days before 8th president Martin Van Buren (died July 24, 1862)

12th president Zachary Taylor (died July 9, 1850)

- 11 years, 193 days before 10th president John Tyler (died January 18, 1862)
- 12 years, 15 days before 8th president Martin Van Buren (died July 24, 1862)

15th president James Buchanan (died June 1, 1868)

- 1 year, 129 days before 14th president Franklin Pierce (died October 8, 1869)
- 5 years, 280 days before 13th president Millard Fillmore (died March 8, 1874)

16th president Abraham Lincoln (died April 15, 1865)

- 3 years, 47 days before 15th president James Buchanan (died June 1, 1868)
- 4 years, 176 days before 14th president Franklin Pierce (died October 8, 1869)
- 8 years, 327 days before 13th president Millard Fillmore (died March 8, 1874)

20th president James A. Garfield (died September 19, 1881)

- 3 years, 307 days before 18th president Ulysses S. Grant (died July 23, 1885)
- 11 years, 120 days before 19th president Rutherford B. Hayes (died January 17, 1893)

29th president Warren Harding (died August 2, 1923)

- 185 days before 28th president Woodrow Wilson (died February 3, 1924)
- 6 years, 218 days before 27th president William Howard Taft (died March 8, 1930)

35th president John F. Kennedy (died November 22, 1963)

- 333 days before 31st president Herbert Hoover (died October 20, 1964)
- 5 years, 126 days before 34th president Dwight D. Eisenhower (died March 28, 1969)
- 9 years, 34 days before 33rd president Harry S. Truman (died December 26, 1972)

40th president Ronald Reagan (died June 5, 2004)

- 2 years, 204 days before 38th president Gerald Ford (died December 26, 2006)
- 20 years, 207 days before 39th president Jimmy Carter (died December 29, 2024)

== Died after multiple successors ==
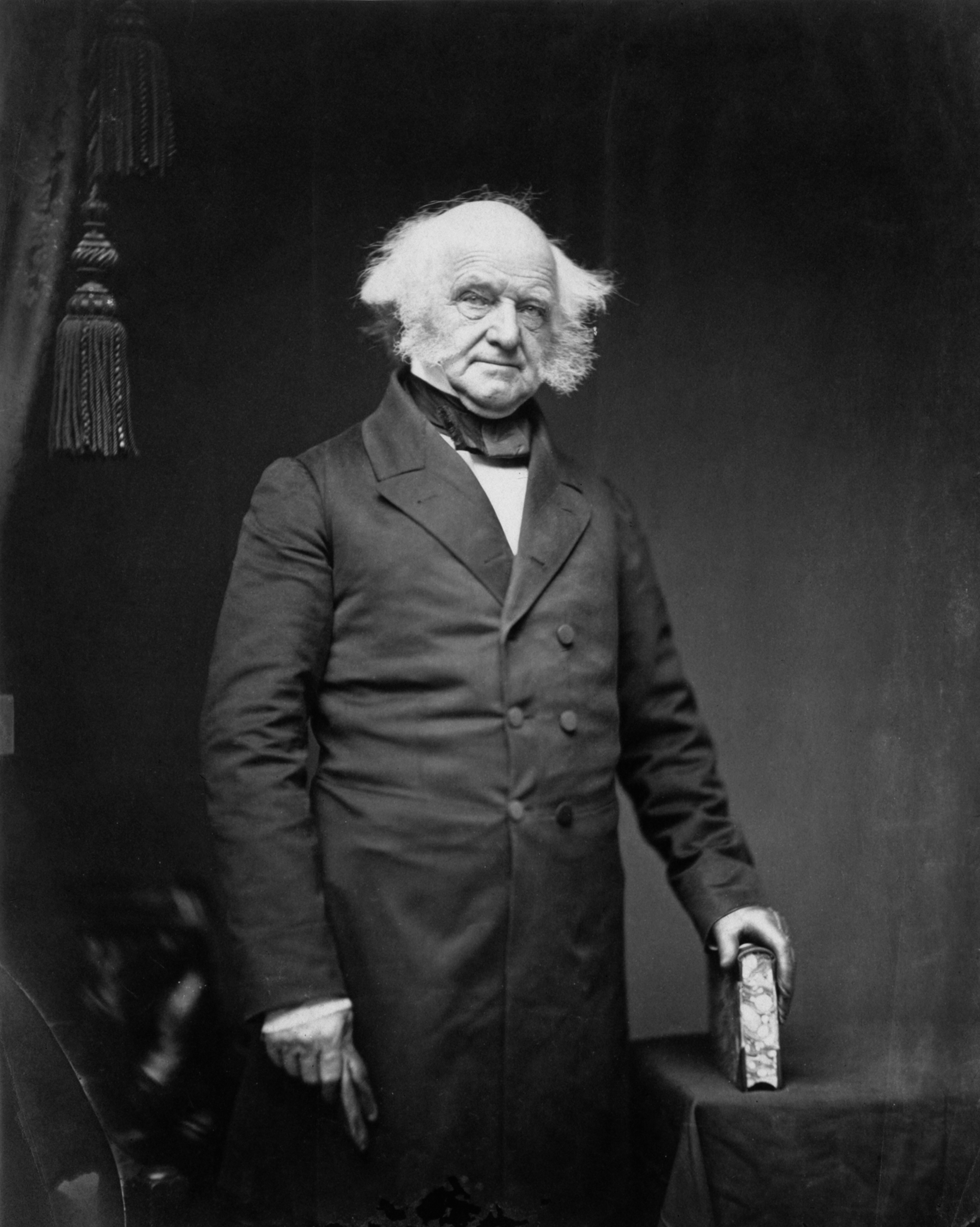
Martin Van Buren outlived four of his successors, more than any other U.S. president

6th president John Quincy Adams (died February 23, 1848)

- 6 years, 325 days after 9th president William Henry Harrison (died April 4, 1841)
- 2 years, 260 days after 7th president Andrew Jackson (died June 8, 1845)

8th president Martin Van Buren (died July 24, 1862)

- 21 years, 111 days after 9th president William Henry Harrison (died April 4, 1841)
- 13 years, 39 days after 11th president James K. Polk (died June 15, 1849)
- 12 years, 15 days after 12th president Zachary Taylor (died July 9, 1850)
- 187 days after 10th president John Tyler (died January 18, 1862)

10th president John Tyler (died January 18, 1862)

- 12 years, 217 days after 11th president James K. Polk (died June 15, 1849)
- 11 years, 193 days after 12th president Zachary Taylor (died July 9, 1850)

13th president Millard Fillmore (died March 8, 1874)

- 8 years, 327 days after 16th president Abraham Lincoln (died April 15, 1865)
- 5 years, 280 days after 15th president James Buchanan (died June 1, 1868)
- 4 years, 151 days after 14th president Franklin Pierce (died October 8, 1869)

14th president Franklin Pierce (died October 8, 1869)

- 4 years, 176 days after 16th president Abraham Lincoln (died April 15, 1865)
- 1 year, 129 days after 15th president James Buchanan (died June 1, 1868)

19th president Rutherford B. Hayes (died January 17, 1893)

- 11 years, 120 days after 20th president James A. Garfield (died September 19, 1881)
- 6 years, 60 days after 21st president Chester A. Arthur (died November 18, 1886)

22nd & 24th president Grover Cleveland (died June 24, 1908)

- 7 years, 103 days after 23rd president Benjamin Harrison (died March 13, 1901)
- 6 years, 284 days after 25th president William McKinley (died September 14, 1901)

27th president William Howard Taft (died March 8, 1930)

- 6 years, 218 days after 29th president Warren Harding (died August 2, 1923)
- 6 years, 33 days after 28th president Woodrow Wilson (died February 3, 1924)

31st president Herbert Hoover (died October 20, 1964)

- 19 years, 191 days after 32nd president Franklin D. Roosevelt (died April 12, 1945)
- 333 days after 35th president John F. Kennedy (died November 22, 1963)

33rd president Harry S. Truman (died December 26, 1972)

- 9 years, 34 days after 35th president John F. Kennedy (died November 22, 1963)
- 3 years, 273 days after 34th president Dwight D. Eisenhower (died March 28, 1969)

39th president Jimmy Carter (died December 29, 2024)

- 20 years, 207 days after 40th president Ronald Reagan (died June 5, 2004)
- 6 years, 29 days after 41st president George H. W. Bush (died November 30, 2018)

== See also ==
- Curse of Tippecanoe
- State funerals in the United States
