= Lincoln–Kennedy coincidences urban legend =

Urban legend about two U.S. presidents

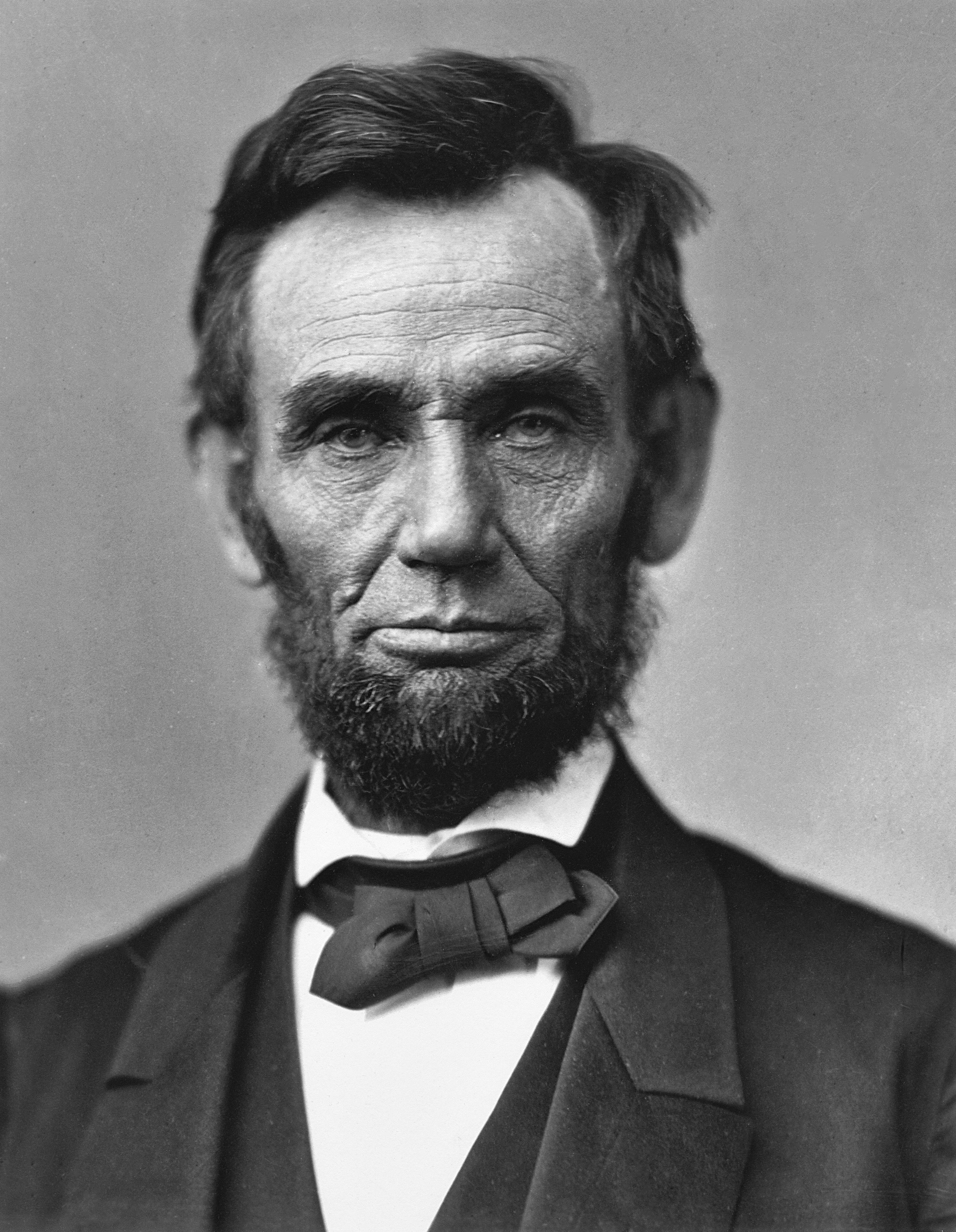
Abraham Lincoln

John F. Kennedy

There are many coincidences with the assassinations of U.S. presidents Abraham Lincoln and John F. Kennedy, and these have become a piece of American folklore. The list of coincidences appeared in the mainstream American press in 1964, a year after the assassination of John F. Kennedy, having appeared prior to that in the GOP Congressional Committee Newsletter. In the 1970s, Martin Gardner examined the list in an article in Scientific American (later reprinted in his 1985 book, The Magic Numbers of Dr. Matrix), pointing out that several of the claimed coincidences were based on misinformation. Gardner's version of the list contained 16 items; many subsequent versions have circulated much longer lists.

A 1999 examination by Snopes found that the listed "coincidences are easily explained as the simple product of mere chance." In 1992, the Skeptical Inquirer ran a "Spooky Presidential Coincidences Contest." One winner found a series of sixteen similar coincidences between Kennedy and former Mexican president Álvaro Obregón. Another winner came up with similar lists for twenty-one pairs of U.S. presidents. For example, there were 13 similarities found between Thomas Jefferson and Andrew Jackson.

== List ==
The following are some of the "coincidences" that commonly appear on these lists, some of which are not true statements:

- "Lincoln" and "Kennedy" each have seven letters.
- Both presidents were elected to Congress in '46 (1846 and 1946) and later to the presidency in '60 (1860 and 1960).
- Both assassins, John Wilkes Booth and Lee Harvey Oswald, were known by their three names, composed of fifteen letters.
- Booth ran from a theater and was caught in a warehouse; Oswald ran from a warehouse and was caught in a theater.
- The assassins were both Southerners.
- Both of the presidents' successors were Southern Democrats named Johnson (Andrew and Lyndon) with six-letter first names and born in '08.
- Both Lincoln and Kennedy were particularly concerned with civil rights and made their views strongly known.
- Both presidents lost children while living in the White House.
- Both presidents were shot in the head on a Friday and in the presence of their wives.
- Lincoln had a secretary named Kennedy who told him not to go to Ford's Theatre. Kennedy had a secretary named Evelyn Lincoln and she warned him not to go to Dallas.
- Both Oswald and Booth were killed before they could be put on trial.
- Lincoln was killed in Ford's Theatre while Kennedy was killed in a car made by Ford Motor Company.

== Accuracy ==
=== True statements ===
- Both were elected to congress in '46: Lincoln was elected in 1846 from Illinois, and Kennedy was elected in 1946 from Massachusetts.
- Both were elected to the presidency in '60: Lincoln was elected in 1860, and Kennedy was elected in 1960.
- Both were concerned with civil rights:
  - Lincoln felt strongly that all slaves should be freed and issued the Emancipation Proclamation, which legally freed slaves within the Confederacy.
  - Kennedy was concerned with racial equality and was the first to propose what would become the Civil Rights Act of 1964.
- Both married in their 30s to women who were in their 20s:
  - Lincoln was married on November 4, 1842. Lincoln was born on February 12, 1809, making him 33 years old at the time of his wedding. Lincoln's bride, Mary Anne Todd, was born on December 13, 1818, making her 23 years old at the time of the wedding.
  - Kennedy was married on September 12, 1953. Kennedy was born on May 29, 1917, making him 36 years old at the time of his wedding. Kennedy's bride, Jacqueline Bouvier, was born on July 28, 1929, making her 24 years old at the time of the wedding.
- Both lost children while living in the White House:
  - Lincoln's son William Wallace Lincoln died of typhoid fever at the White House on February 20, 1862 at the age of 11 years old.
  - Kennedy's son Patrick Bouvier Kennedy died from complications of hyaline membrane disease (HMD) on August 9, 1963 at the age of 2 days old.
- Both were shot on a Friday: Lincoln was shot on Good Friday, April 14, 1865, and Kennedy was shot on Friday, November 22, 1963.
- Both were shot in the head. (Lincoln and Kennedy).
- Both had security agents named William who each died within 48 hours of attaining the age of 75 years, 5 months: Lincoln's bodyguard, William H. Crook, was born October 15, 1839, and died March 13, 1915. Kennedy's Secret Service agent, William Greer, was born September 22, 1909, and died February 23, 1985.
- Both of the presidents' successors were named Johnson: Lincoln was succeeded by Andrew Johnson, and Kennedy was succeeded by Lyndon B. Johnson.
- Both were succeeded by Southerners: Andrew Johnson was from Tennessee, and Lyndon B. Johnson was from Texas.
- Both successors were born in '08: Andrew Johnson was born December 29, 1808, and Lyndon B. Johnson was born August 27, 1908.
- Both assassins, John Wilkes Booth and Lee Harvey Oswald, are known by their three names, although this is common for many notorious assassins who are covered by the press. This is routinely done by the press to avoid tarnishing the reputations of people with similar names (there are many John Booths and Lee Oswalds).
  - Both assassins' full names have exactly fifteen letters.
- Booth and Oswald were killed before their trials and within the same month as the assassination.
  - On April 26, 1865, after refusing to surrender, John Wilkes Booth was shot by Sergeant Boston Corbett.
  - On November 24, 1963, on his way to the county jail, Lee Harvey Oswald was shot by night club owner Jack Ruby.
- Lincoln and Kennedy were both killed in a 'Ford'.
  - Lincoln was shot in Ford's Theater, and Kennedy was shot while riding in a Lincoln Continental 4-door convertible made by Ford Motor Co.
- Both presidents were assassinated by Southerners.
  - Oswald was born in Louisiana and Booth in Maryland. Both of these states are considered to be part of the American South, although Maryland is also part of the Mid-Atlantic, and supported the Union in the US Civil War.

=== False assumption ===
- Although President Kennedy had a secretary named Lincoln, President Lincoln did not have a secretary named Kennedy. Lincoln's secretaries were John G. Nicolay and John M. Hay.
- Booth ran from a theater and was caught in a warehouse, and Oswald ran from a warehouse and was caught in a theater:
  - Booth did run from Ford's Theatre where he shot Lincoln, but was caught in a barn in Virginia, not a warehouse.
  - Oswald fled from the Texas School Book Depository, which was a warehouse where Oswald worked and from where he had shot Kennedy. Oswald was arrested in a movie theater.
- Both assassins were born in '39:
  - Oswald was born in 1939, but Booth was born in 1838.

== Analysis ==
Some urban folklorists have postulated that the list provided a way for people to make sense of two tragic events in American history by seeking out patterns. Gardner and others have said that it is relatively easy to find seemingly meaningful patterns relating any two people or events. The psychological phenomenon of apophenia – defined as "the tendency to perceive order in random configurations" – has been proposed as a possible reason for the lists' enduring popularity.

Most of the items listed above are true, such as the year in which Lincoln and Kennedy were each elected president, but this is not so unusual given that presidential elections are held only every four years. A few of the items are simply untrue: for example, Lincoln never had a secretary named Kennedy; Lincoln's secretaries were John Hay and John G. Nicolay. However, Lincoln's footman, William H. Crook, did advise Lincoln not to go that night to Ford's Theatre. David Mikkelson of Snopes points out many ways in which Lincoln and Kennedy do not match, to show the superficial nature of the alleged coincidences: For example, Lincoln was born in 1809 but Kennedy in 1917. Lincoln and Kennedy were both elected in '60, but Lincoln was already in his second term when he was assassinated; Kennedy was not. Also, neither the years, months, nor dates of their assassinations match. Although both were shot on Fridays, Lincoln did not die from his injuries until Saturday.

== Musical remembrance ==
Buddy Starcher wrote a song, "History Repeats Itself," recounting many of these coincidences and parallels between the two presidents' careers and deaths. The song became an American Top 40 hit during the spring of 1966, and reached number two on the Country chart. Cab Calloway also scored a minor chart hit with the song that same year.

== See also ==
- Birthday problem
- Data dredging
- The Dark Side of the Rainbow
- Kennedy curse
