= Second-term curse =

Purported curse regarding the second term of U.S. presidents

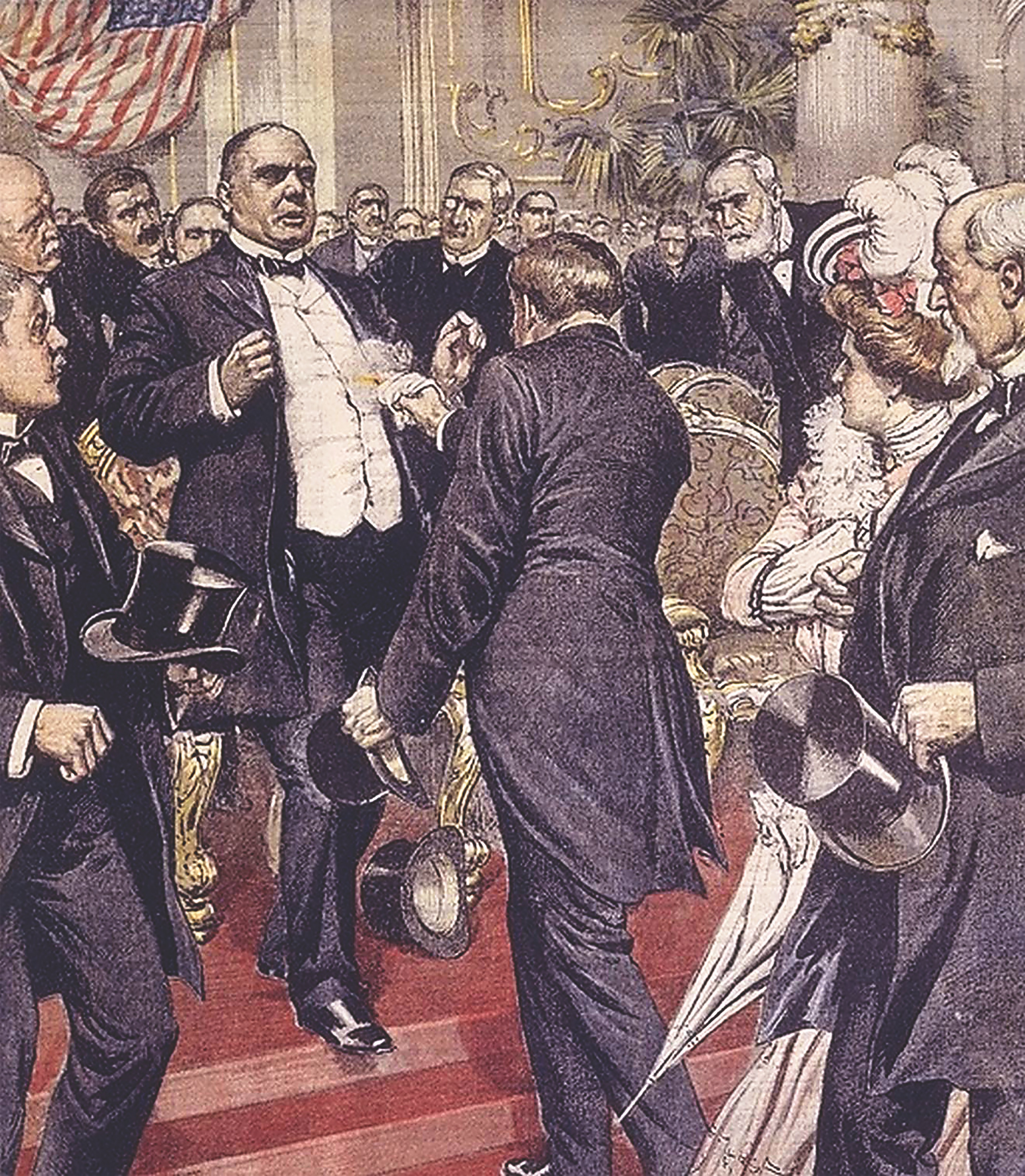
An illustration of the assassination of William McKinley, an event which happened in his second term

The second-term curse is the perceived tendency of second term U.S. presidents to be less successful than their first terms.

According to the curse, the second terms of U.S. presidents have usually been plagued by a major scandal, policy inertia, some sort of catastrophe, or other problems. There have been twenty-two U.S. presidents who have served a second term, each of whom has faced difficulties attributed to the curse. The legend behind the second-term curse is that after Franklin D. Roosevelt broke the de facto second term limit by running for third and fourth terms, the ghost of George Washington might have put a curse on any president who seeks a second term. This legend notwithstanding, several presidents who served prior to this, including Washington and Roosevelt themselves, were plagued by problems in their second term more serious than in their first.

Whether this perceived tendency is real is a subject of dispute: for example, political statistician Nate Silver, after analyzing presidential approval ratings for Harry S. Truman through Barack Obama, did find that approval ratings were lower on average during second terms, but he also found a variety of other reasons to explain those ratings, such as regression toward the mean, and he concluded that "the idea of the second-term curse is sloppy as an analytical concept". In addition, political writer Michael Barone cited several presidents who had successful second terms, and wrote that "second-term problems resulted more often from the failure to adjust to changed circumstances and unanticipated challenges". Conversely, a 2013 report in The Economist has said that the existence of the second-term curse is supported by data. The report stated that each of the eleven second terms served from the beginning of the Theodore Roosevelt administration to the end of the George W. Bush administration were less economically prosperous than their respective president's first term, save for the second terms of Truman, Ronald Reagan, and Bill Clinton. However, these findings could be due to the effect of survivorship bias; presidents who are elected for a second term are more likely to have had a good first term, making their second term look worse by comparison.

== Presidents of the curse ==
| President | | Second term | Attributed event(s) |
|---|---|---|---|
| George Washington | George Washington | 1793–1797 | Ramifications of the French Revolutionary Wars; Controversy over his signing of the Jay Treaty; Fatigue due to political infighting |
| Thomas Jefferson | Thomas Jefferson | 1805–1809 | Burr conspiracy; Embargo Act of 1807 |
| James Madison | James Madison | 1813–1817 | Burning of Washington |
| James Monroe | James Monroe | 1821–1825 | Congressional rejection of his anti-slavery efforts |
| Andrew Jackson | Andrew Jackson | 1833–1837 | Events in the Bank War which laid the groundwork for the Panic of 1837 |
| Abraham Lincoln | Abraham Lincoln | 1865 | His assassination |
| Ulysses S. Grant | Ulysses S. Grant | 1873–1877 | Panic of 1873; Failure of his Reconstruction efforts to uphold the rights of Southern African-Americans; Numerous scandals |
| Grover Cleveland | Grover Cleveland | 1893–1897 (Note: Served non-consecutive terms.) | Personal struggles with oral cancer; Panic of 1893 |
| William McKinley | William McKinley | 1901 | His assassination |
| Theodore Roosevelt | Theodore Roosevelt | 1905–1909 (Note: Was serving his first full term after finishing out the term of his predecessor, who died in office.) | The U.S. economy was not as strong as it was during his first term. |
| Woodrow Wilson | Woodrow Wilson | 1917–1921 | U.S. entry into World War I; Unpopularity stemming from his refusal to accept reservations to the Treaty of Versailles, leading to the Senate's rejection of the treaty; Failure to get the U.S. to join the League of Nations; Suffered a stroke; Controversy over the Espionage Act of 1917 and the Sedition Act of 1918; The U.S. economy was not as strong as it was during his first term. |
| Calvin Coolidge | Calvin Coolidge | 1925–1929 | The U.S. economy was not as strong as it was during his first term. |
| Franklin D. Roosevelt | Franklin D. Roosevelt | 1937–1941 | Failure of the "court-packing plan"; The U.S. economy was not as strong as it was during his first term. |
| Harry S. Truman | Harry S. Truman | 1949–1953 | Korean War; Controversy over his relief of General Douglas MacArthur |
| Dwight D. Eisenhower | Dwight D. Eisenhower | 1957–1961 | Overcoat scandal; 1960 U-2 incident; The U.S. economy was not as strong as it was during his first term. |
| Lyndon B. Johnson | Lyndon B. Johnson | 1965–1969 | Vietnam War; Reaction to the Great Society; Urban riots and the Kerner Commission; Loss of Wisconsin primary to Eugene McCarthy and his withdrawal from the 1968 presidential election; The U.S. economy was not as strong as it was during his first term. |
| Richard Nixon | Richard Nixon | 1973–1974 (Note: Became the first president to resign the office) | Watergate scandal and subsequent resignation; The U.S. economy was not as strong as it was during his first term. |
| Ronald Reagan | Ronald Reagan | 1985–1989 | Iran–Contra affair |
| Bill Clinton | Bill Clinton | 1997–2001 | Paula Jones lawsuit; Lewinsky scandal and subsequent impeachment; Pardon controversy |
| George W. Bush | George W. Bush | 2005–2009 | Failure of Social Security reform; Hurricane Katrina; Failed Supreme Court nomination of Harriet Miers; Indictment of Scooter Libby during the Plame affair; 2008 financial crisis |
| Barack Obama | Barack Obama | 2013–2017 | Edward Snowden leaks; United States federal government shutdown of 2013; IRS targeting controversy; David Petraeus' affair and guilty plea; Failed Supreme Court nomination of Merrick Garland |
| Donald Trump | Donald Trump | 2025–present | Greenland crisis; Hardline immigration policy; 2026 Iran war; Rising fuel prices caused by the war; Epstein files |

== See also ==
- Curse of Tippecanoe
- Six-year itch
