= Advice and consent =

Parliamentary procedure

Advice and consent is an English phrase frequently used in enacting formulae of bills and in other legal or constitutional contexts. It describes either of two situations: where a weak executive branch of a government enacts something previously approved of by the legislative branch or where the legislative branch concurs and approves something previously enacted by a strong executive branch.

The concept serves to moderate the power of one branch of government by requiring the concurrence of another branch for selected actions. The expression is frequently used in weak executive systems where the head of state has little practical power, and in practice the important part of the passage of a law is in its adoption by the legislature.

== United Kingdom ==
In the United Kingdom, a constitutional monarchy, bills are headed:

BE IT ENACTED by the King's most Excellent Majesty, by and with the advice and consent of the Lords Spiritual and Temporal, and Commons, in this present Parliament assembled, and by the authority of the same, as follows:

This enacting formula emphasizes that although legally the bill is being enacted by the British monarchy (specifically, by the King-in-Parliament), it is not through his initiative but through that of Parliament that legislation is created.

=== Commonwealth ===
==== Singapore ====
In Singapore, a parliamentary republic with the President of Singapore being the head of state, the President has a number of powers. Some of the President's powers may only be exercised "on the advice of the Cabinet". In this context, "advice of the Cabinet" means that the President must not only consider the Cabinet's advice but also act in full accordance with it, with no ability to exercise discretionary power.

== United States ==
In the United States, "advice and consent" is a power of the United States Senate to be consulted on and approve treaties signed and appointments made by the president of the United States to public positions, including Cabinet secretaries, federal judges, officers of the armed forces, United States attorneys, ambassadors, and other smaller offices. This power is also held by several state senates, which are consulted on and approve various appointments made by the state's chief executive, such as some statewide officials, state departmental heads in the governor's cabinet, and state judges (in some states).

=== Constitutional provision ===
The term advice and consent appears twice in the United States Constitution, both times in Article II, Section 2, Clause 2. First, the term is used in reference to the senate's role in the signing and ratification of treaties. Then, it is used to describe the Senate's role in the nomination and confirmation process for federal appointees.

[The President] shall have Power, by and with the Advice and Consent of the Senate, to make Treaties, provided two thirds of the Senators present concur; and he shall nominate, and by and with the Advice and Consent of the Senate, shall appoint Ambassadors, other public Ministers and Consuls, Judges of the Supreme Court, and all other Officers of the United States, whose Appointments are not herein otherwise provided for, and which shall be established by Law: but the Congress may by Law vest the Appointment of such inferior Officers, as they think proper, in the President alone, in the Courts of Law, or in the Heads of Departments.

This language was written at the Constitutional Convention as part of a delicate compromise concerning the balance of power in the federal government. Many delegates preferred to develop a strong executive control vested in the president, but others, worried about authoritarian control, preferred to strengthen the Congress. Requiring the president to gain the advice and consent of the Senate achieved both goals without hindering the business of government.

Under the Twenty-fifth Amendment, appointments to the office of vice president are confirmed by a majority vote in both houses of Congress, instead of just the Senate.

=== Historical development of power ===
While several framers of the U.S. Constitution, such as Thomas Jefferson and James Madison, believed that the required role of the Senate is to advise the president after the nomination has been made by the president, Roger Sherman believed that advice before nomination could still be helpful. President George Washington took the position that pre-nomination advice was allowable but not mandatory. The notion that pre-nomination advice is optional has developed into the unification of the "advice" portion of the power with the "consent" portion, although several Presidents have consulted informally with Senators over nominations and treaties.

=== Use today ===
==== Senate ====
Typically, a Senate hearing is held to question an appointee prior to a committee vote. If the nominee is approved by the relevant committee, the nomination is sent to the full Senate for a confirmation vote. The actual motion adopted by the Senate when exercising the power is "to advise and consent". For appointments, a majority of Senators present are needed to pass a motion "to advise and consent". However, tactics have been used to require more than majority support to pass such a motion, including filibuster.

On November 21, 2013, the Democratic Party, led by then-majority leader Harry Reid, overrode the filibuster of a nomination with a simple majority vote to change the rules (exercising the parliamentary "nuclear option"). As a result of the changed precedent, judicial nominees to federal courts and a president's executive-branch nominations can proceed to a confirmation vote by a simple majority vote of the Senate. However, Reid left the filibuster in place for Supreme Court nominees.

On February 13, 2016, Mitch McConnell, Senate majority leader of the Republican Party, said that the Senate would refuse to confirm a replacement for Supreme Court justice Antonin Scalia until after the 2016 presidential election, a historic rebuke of President Obama's authority and an extraordinary challenge to the practice of considering each nominee on his or her individual merits. Despite McConnell's claim, no Senate leader had ever asserted such a right — and there was no precedent for a sitting president to hand over his power of high-court appointment at the request of any member of the legislative branch.

In April 2017, McConnell and the Republican Party exercised the "nuclear option" to overcome Democratic opposition to Neil Gorsuch's appointment to the Supreme Court.

In July 2020, Senator Tammy Duckworth put a hold on consent for military officers' appointments at colonel and above. Her goal was to learn if Alexander Vindman was properly considered for promotion, despite his testimony to Congress against President Trump. She removed the hold after two weeks, when the Secretary of Defense told her he was approved for promotion, though he had retired by then.

From February to December 2023, Senator Tommy Tuberville put a hold on consent for the appointment of senior military officers. His goal was to press for a vote on a new military benefit which paid for out of state travel for abortions. The hold covered 451 senior officers, and ended without the vote on abortion travel. The Defense Department adjusted to the hold by moving officers and civilians into acting positions, and postponing some retirements. A year later 6,000 officers were confirmed without a hold. On average the Senate confirms about 50,000 military appointments per year.

In 2025, Senate Republicans changed the rules of the confirmation process to allow an unlimited number of executive branch nominees to be confirmed as a single group, excluding Cabinet secretaries. This followed Senate Democrats requiring a lengthy process for nearly every one of Trump's executive branch nominees, and Trump considering asking Congress to recess so he could appoint officials without confirmation.

==== House of Representatives ====
Confirmation hearings may be held in the House for nominees for vice-president upon a vacancy, as did happen for Gerald Ford (1973) and later Nelson Rockefeller (1974).

== See also ==
- Promulgation
