= Vice President of the United States =

Second-highest constitutional office in the US

- Vice presidential seal

- Vice presidential flag

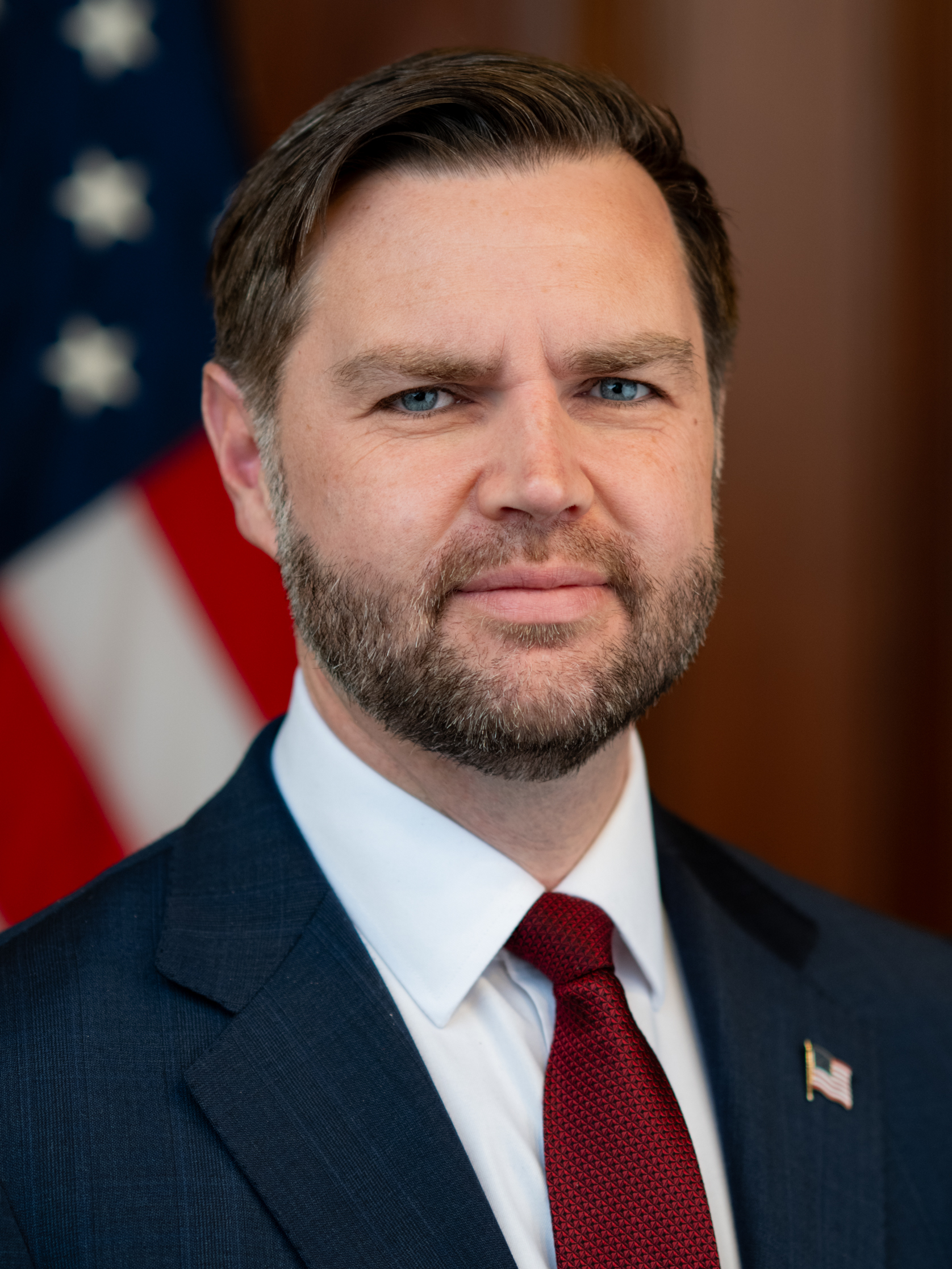
- Incumbent; JD Vance since January 20, 2025
- United States Senate; Executive branch of the U.S. Government; Office of the Vice President of the United States
- Style: Mr. Vice President (informal); The Honorable (formal); Mr. President (within the Senate); His Excellency (diplomatic)
- Status: Second highest executive branch office; President of the Senate
- Member of: Cabinet; National Security Council; National Space Council; National Economic Council; United States Senate
- Residence: Number One Observatory Circle
- Seat: Washington, D.C.
- Appointer: Electoral College, or, if vacant, President of the United States via congressional confirmation
- Term length: Four years, no term limit
- Constituting instrument: Constitution of the United States
- Formation: March 4, 1789 (237 years ago)
- First holder: John Adams
- Succession: First
- Unofficial names: VPOTUS, VP, Veep
- Salary: $284,600 per annum
- Website: whitehouse.gov

The vice president of the United States (VPOTUS, VP, or informally veep) is the second-highest office in the executive branch of the U.S. federal government, after the president of the United States, and ranks first in the presidential line of succession. The vice president is also an officer in the legislative branch, as the president of the Senate. In this capacity, the vice president is empowered to preside over the United States Senate, but may not vote except to cast a tie-breaking vote. The vice president is elected at the same time as the president to a four-year term of office by the people of the United States through the Electoral College, but the electoral votes are cast separately for these two offices. Following the passage in 1967 of the Twenty-fifth Amendment to the U.S. Constitution, a vacancy in the office of vice president may be filled by presidential nomination and confirmation by a majority vote in both houses of Congress. This was based on the Tyler Precedent set in 1841 when John Tyler became the first vice president to take over for a deceased president following the death of William Henry Harrison.

The modern vice presidency is a position of significant power and is widely seen as an integral part of a president's administration. The presidential candidate selects the candidate for the vice presidency as their running mate in the lead-up to the presidential election. The exact nature of the role varies in each administration. Since the vice president's service in office is by election, the president cannot dismiss the vice president, and the personal working-relationship with the president varies: most modern vice presidents serve as a key presidential advisor, governing partner, and representative of the president. The vice president is also a statutory member of the United States Cabinet and United States National Security Council and thus plays a significant role in executive government and national security matters. As the vice president's role within the executive branch has expanded, the legislative branch role has contracted; for example, vice presidents now preside over the Senate only infrequently.

The role of the vice presidency has changed dramatically since the office was created during the 1787 Constitutional Convention. Originally something of an afterthought, the vice presidency was considered an insignificant office for much of the nation's history, especially after the Twelfth Amendment meant that vice presidents were no longer the runners-up in the presidential election. The vice president's role began steadily growing in importance during the 1930s, with the Office of the Vice President being created in the executive branch in 1939, and has since grown much further. Due to its increase in power and prestige, the vice presidency is now often considered to be a stepping stone to the presidency. Since the 1970s, the vice president has been afforded an official residence at Number One Observatory Circle.

The Constitution does not expressly assign the vice presidency to a branch of the government, causing a dispute among scholars about which branch the office belongs to (the executive, the legislative, both, or neither). The modern view of the vice president as an officer of the executive branch—one isolated almost entirely from the legislative branch—is due in large part to the assignment of executive authority to the vice president by either the president or Congress. Nevertheless, many vice presidents have previously served in Congress, and are often tasked with helping to advance an administration's legislative priorities. John Adams was the country's first vice president. JD Vance is the 50th and current vice president since January 20, 2025.

== History and development ==
=== Constitutional Convention ===
No mention of an office of vice president was made at the 1787 Constitutional Convention until near the end, when an eleven-member committee on "Leftover Business" proposed a method of electing the chief executive (president). Delegates had previously considered the selection of the Senate's presiding officer, deciding that "the Senate shall choose its own President", and had agreed that this official would be designated the executive's immediate successor. They had also considered the mode of election of the executive but had not reached consensus. This all changed on September 4, when the committee recommended that the nation's chief executive be elected by an Electoral College, with each state having a number of presidential electors equal to the sum of that state's allocation of representatives and senators.

Recognizing that loyalty to one's individual state outweighed loyalty to the new federation, the Constitution's framers assumed individual electors would be inclined to choose a candidate from their own state (a so-called "favorite son" candidate) over one from another state. So they created the office of vice president and required the electors to vote for two candidates, at least one of whom must be from outside the elector's state, believing that the second vote would be cast for a candidate of national character. Additionally, to guard against the possibility that electors might strategically waste their second votes, it was specified that the first runner-up would become vice president.

The resultant method of electing the president and vice president, spelled out in Article II, Section 1, Clause 3, allocated to each state a number of electors equal to the combined total of its Senate and House of Representatives membership. Each elector was allowed to vote for two people for president (rather than for both president and vice president), but could not differentiate between their first and second choice for the presidency. The person receiving the greatest number of votes (provided it was an absolute majority of the whole number of electors) would be president, while the individual who received the next largest number of votes became vice president. If there were a tie for first or for second place, or if no one won a majority of votes, the president and vice president would be selected by means of contingent elections protocols stated in the clause.

=== Early vice presidents and Twelfth Amendment ===
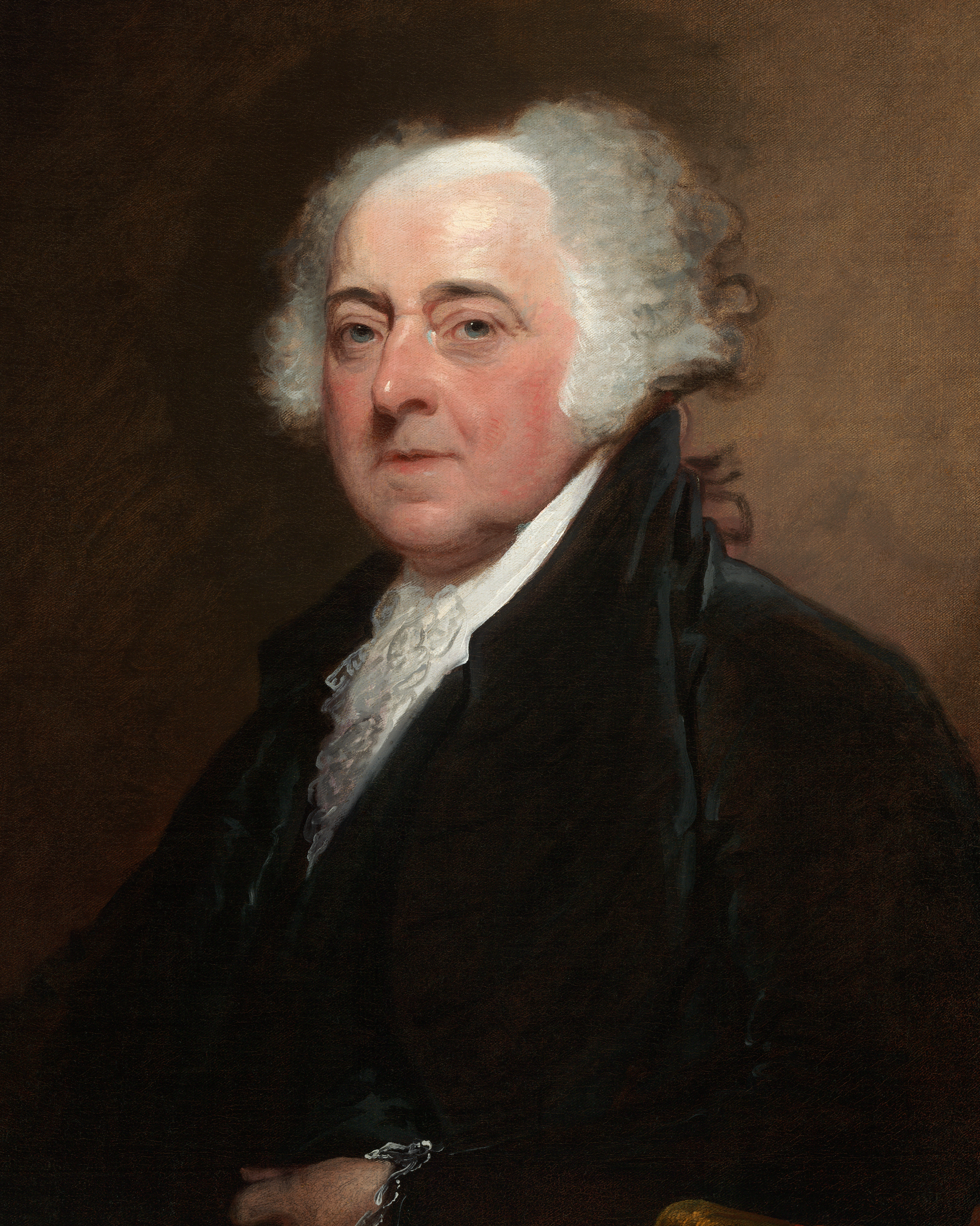
John Adams, the first vice president of the United States

The first two vice presidents, John Adams and Thomas Jefferson, both of whom gained the office by virtue of being runners-up in presidential contests, presided regularly over Senate proceedings and did much to shape the role of Senate president. Several 19th-century vice presidents—such as George Dallas, Levi Morton, and Garret Hobart—followed their example and led effectively, while others were rarely present.

The emergence of political parties and nationally coordinated election campaigns during the 1790s (which the Constitution's framers had not contemplated) quickly frustrated the election plan in the original Constitution. In the election of 1796, Federalist candidate John Adams won the presidency, but his bitter rival, Democratic-Republican candidate Thomas Jefferson, came second and thus won the vice presidency. As a result, the president and vice president were from opposing parties; and Jefferson used the vice presidency to frustrate the president's policies. Then, four years later, in the election of 1800, Jefferson and fellow Democratic-Republican Aaron Burr each received 73 electoral votes. In the contingent election that followed, Jefferson finally won the presidency on the 36th ballot, leaving Burr the vice presidency. Afterward, the system was overhauled through the Twelfth Amendment in time to be used in the 1804 election.

=== 19th and early 20th centuries ===
For much of its existence, the office of vice president was seen as little more than a minor position. John Adams, the first vice president, was the first of many frustrated by the "complete insignificance" of the office. To his wife Abigail Adams he wrote, "My country has in its wisdom contrived for me the most insignificant office that ever the invention of man ... or his imagination contrived or his imagination conceived; and as I can do neither good nor evil, I must be borne away by others and met the common fate." Thomas R. Marshall, who served as vice president from 1913 to 1921 under President Woodrow Wilson, lamented: "Once there were two brothers. One ran away to sea; the other was elected Vice President of the United States. And nothing was heard of either of them again." His successor, Calvin Coolidge, was so obscure that Major League Baseball sent him free passes that misspelled his name, and a fire marshal failed to recognize him when Coolidge's Washington residence was evacuated. John Nance Garner, who served as vice president from 1933 to 1941 under President Franklin D. Roosevelt, claimed that the vice presidency "isn't worth a pitcher of warm piss". Harry S. Truman, who also served as vice president under Franklin D. Roosevelt, said the office was as "useful as a cow's fifth teat". Walter Bagehot remarked in The English Constitution that "[t]he framers of the Constitution expected that the vice-president would be elected by the Electoral College as the second wisest man in the country. The vice-presidentship being a sinecure, a second-rate man agreeable to the wire-pullers is always smuggled in. The chance of succession to the presidentship is too distant to be thought of."

When the Whig Party asked Daniel Webster to run for the vice presidency on Zachary Taylor's ticket, he replied "I do not propose to be buried until I am really dead and in my coffin." This was the second time Webster declined the office, which William Henry Harrison had first offered to him. Ironically, both the presidents making the offer to Webster died in office, meaning the three-time candidate would have become president had he accepted either. Since presidents rarely die in office, however, the better preparation for the presidency was considered to be the office of Secretary of State, in which Webster served under Harrison, Tyler, and later, Taylor's successor, Fillmore.

In the first hundred years of the United States' existence no fewer than seven proposals to abolish the office of vice president were advanced. The first such constitutional amendment was presented by Samuel W. Dana in 1800; it was defeated by a vote of 27 to 85 in the United States House of Representatives. The second, introduced by United States Senator James Hillhouse in 1808, was also defeated. During the late 1860s and 1870s, five additional amendments were proposed. One advocate, James Mitchell Ashley, opined that the office of vice president was "superfluous" and dangerous.

Garret Hobart, the first vice president under William McKinley, was one of the very few vice presidents at this time who played an important role in the administration. A close confidant and adviser of the president, Hobart was called "Assistant President". However, until 1919, vice presidents were not included in meetings of the President's Cabinet. This precedent was broken by Woodrow Wilson when he asked Thomas R. Marshall to preside over Cabinet meetings while Wilson was in France negotiating the Treaty of Versailles. President Warren G. Harding also invited Calvin Coolidge to meetings. The next vice president, Charles G. Dawes, did not seek to attend Cabinet meetings under President Coolidge, declaring that "the precedent might prove injurious to the country."

=== Emergence of the modern vice presidency ===
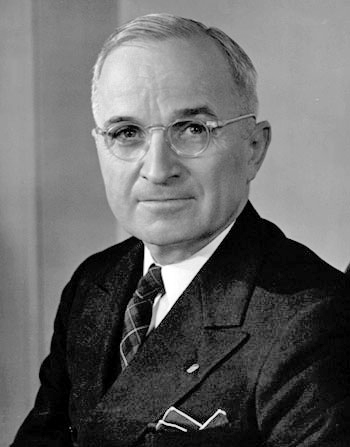
Though prominent as a Missouri Senator, Harry S. Truman had been vice president only three months when he became president; he was never informed of Franklin D. Roosevelt's war or postwar policies while serving as vice president. This led to several statutory reforms concerning the office.

In 1929, Herbert Hoover raised the status of the office by renewing the practice of inviting the vice president to cabinet meetings, which every president since has maintained.

Unlike his predecessor U.S. vice-presidents, John Nance Garner had a highly prominent role in shaping the president's policies, with Roosevelt using Garner's knowledge and experience to pilot New Deal legislation through Congress. However, Garner broke with Roosevelt over the "court-packing" issue early in his second term, and became Roosevelt's leading critic. At the start of that term, on January 20, 1937, Garner had been the first vice president to be sworn into office on the Capitol steps in the same ceremony with the president, a tradition that continues. Prior to that time, vice presidents were traditionally inaugurated at a separate ceremony in the Senate chamber. Gerald Ford and Nelson Rockefeller, who were each appointed to the office under the terms of the 25th Amendment, were inaugurated in the House and Senate chambers respectively.

At the 1940 Democratic National Convention, Roosevelt selected his own running mate, Henry Wallace, instead of leaving the nomination to the convention, when he wanted Garner replaced. He then gave Wallace major responsibilities during World War II. However, after numerous policy disputes between Wallace and other Roosevelt Administration and Democratic Party officials, he was denied re-nomination at the 1944 Democratic National Convention. Harry S. Truman was selected instead. During his 82-day vice presidency, Truman was never informed about any war or post-war plans, including the Manhattan Project. Truman had no visible role in the Roosevelt administration outside of his congressional responsibilities and met with the president only a few times during his tenure as vice president. Roosevelt died on April 12, 1945, and Truman succeeded to the presidency (the state of Roosevelt's health had also been kept from Truman). At the time he said, "I felt like the moon, the stars and all the planets fell on me." Determined that no future vice president should be so uninformed upon unexpectedly becoming president, Truman made the vice president a member of the National Security Council, a participant in Cabinet meetings and a recipient of regular security briefings in 1949.

The stature of the vice presidency grew again while Richard Nixon was in office (1953–1961). He attracted the attention of the media and the Republican Party, when Dwight Eisenhower authorized him to preside at Cabinet meetings in his absence and to assume temporary control of the executive branch, which he did after Eisenhower suffered a heart attack on September 24, 1955, ileitis in June 1956, and a stroke in November 1957. Nixon was also visible on the world stage during his time in office.

Until 1961, vice presidents had their offices on Capitol Hill, a formal office in the Capitol itself and a working office in the Russell Senate Office Building. Lyndon B. Johnson was the first vice president to also be given an office in the White House complex, in the Old Executive Office Building. The former Navy Secretary's office in the OEOB has since been designated the "Ceremonial Office of the Vice President" and is today used for formal events and press interviews. President Jimmy Carter was the first president to give his vice president, Walter Mondale, an office in the West Wing of the White House, which all vice presidents have since retained. Because of their function as president of the Senate, vice presidents still maintain offices and staff members on Capitol Hill. This change came about because Carter held the view that the office of the vice presidency had historically been a wasted asset and wished to have his vice president involved in the decision-making process. Carter pointedly considered, according to Joel Goldstein, the way Roosevelt treated Truman as "immoral".

Another factor behind the rise in prestige of the vice presidency was the expanded use of presidential preference primaries for choosing party nominees during the 20th century. By adopting primary voting, the field of candidates for vice president was expanded by both the increased quantity and quality of presidential candidates successful in some primaries, yet who ultimately failed to capture the presidential nomination at the convention.

At the start of the 21st century, Dick Cheney (2001–2009) held much power within the administration, and frequently made policy decisions on his own, without the knowledge of the president. This rapid growth led to Matthew Yglesias and Bruce Ackerman calling for the abolition of the vice presidency while both of 2008's vice presidential candidates, Sarah Palin and Joe Biden, said they would reduce the role to simply being an adviser to the president.

== Constitutional roles ==
Although delegates to the constitutional convention approved establishing the office, with both its executive and senatorial functions, not many understood the office, and so they gave the vice president few duties and little power. Only a few states had an analogous position. Among those that did, New York's constitution provided that "the lieutenant-governor shall, by virtue of his office, be president of the Senate, and, upon an equal division, have a casting voice in their decisions, but not vote on any other occasion". As a result, the vice presidency originally had authority in only a few areas, although constitutional amendments have added or clarified some matters.

=== President of the Senate ===
Article I, Section 3, Clause 4 confers upon the vice president the title "President of the Senate", authorizing the vice president to preside over Senate meetings. In this capacity, the vice president is responsible for maintaining order and decorum, recognizing members to speak, and interpreting the Senate's rules, practices, and precedent. With this position also comes the authority to cast a tie-breaking vote. In practice, the number of times vice presidents have exercised this right has varied greatly. Kamala Harris holds the record at 33 votes, followed by John C. Calhoun who had previously held the record at 31 votes; John Adams ranks third with 29.

As the framers of the Constitution anticipated that the vice president would not always be available to fulfill this responsibility, the Constitution provides that the Senate may elect a president pro tempore (or "president for a time") in order to maintain the proper ordering of the legislative process. In practice, since the early 20th century, neither the president of the Senate nor the pro tempore regularly presides; instead, the president pro tempore usually delegates the task to other Senate members. Rule XIX, which governs debate, does not authorize the vice president to participate in debate, and grants only to members of the Senate (and, upon appropriate notice, former presidents of the United States) the privilege of addressing the Senate, without granting a similar privilege to the sitting vice president. Thus, Time magazine wrote in 1925, during the tenure of Charles G. Dawes, "once in four years the vice president can make a little speech, and then he is done. For four years he then has to sit in the seat of the silent, attending to speeches ponderous or otherwise, of deliberation or humor."

==== Presiding over impeachment trials ====
In their capacity as president of the Senate, the vice president may preside over most impeachment trials of federal officers, although the Constitution does not specifically require it. However, whenever the president of the United States is on trial, the Constitution requires that the chief justice of the United States must preside. This stipulation was designed to avoid the possible conflict of interest in having the vice president preside over the trial for the removal of the one official standing between them and the presidency. In contrast, the Constitution is silent about which federal official would preside were the vice president on trial by the Senate. No vice president has ever been impeached, thus leaving it unclear whether an impeached vice president could, as president of the Senate, preside at their own impeachment trial.

==== Presiding over electoral vote counts ====
The Twelfth Amendment provides that the vice president, in their capacity as the president of the Senate, receives the Electoral College votes, and then, in the presence of the Senate and House of Representatives, opens the sealed votes. The votes are then counted by Congress during a joint session, in accordance with the additional procedures prescribed by the Electoral Count Act and amended by Electoral Count Reform and Presidential Transition Improvement Act. The former specifies that the president of the Senate presides over the joint session, and the latter clarifies the solely ministerial role the president of the Senate serves in the process. The next such joint session is expected to take place following the 2028 presidential election, on January 6, 2029 (unless Congress sets a different date by law).

In this capacity, four vice presidents have been able to announce their own election to the presidency: John Adams in 1797, Thomas Jefferson in 1801, Martin Van Buren in 1837 and George H. W. Bush in 1989. Conversely, four vice presidents have needed to announce their opponent's election to the presidency: John C. Breckinridge in 1861, Richard Nixon in 1961, Al Gore in 2001, and Kamala Harris in 2025. In 1969, Vice President Hubert Humphrey would have done so as well, following his 1968 loss to Richard Nixon; however, on the date of the congressional joint session, Humphrey was in Norway attending the funeral of Trygve Lie, the first elected Secretary-General of the United Nations. The president pro tempore, Richard Russell, presided in his absence. On February 8, 1933, Vice President Charles Curtis announced the election victory of his successor, House Speaker John Nance Garner, while Garner was seated next to him on the House dais. Similarly, Walter Mondale, in 1981, Dan Quayle, in 1993, and Mike Pence, in 2021, each had to announce their successor's election victory, following their re-election losses.

=== Successor to the U.S. president ===
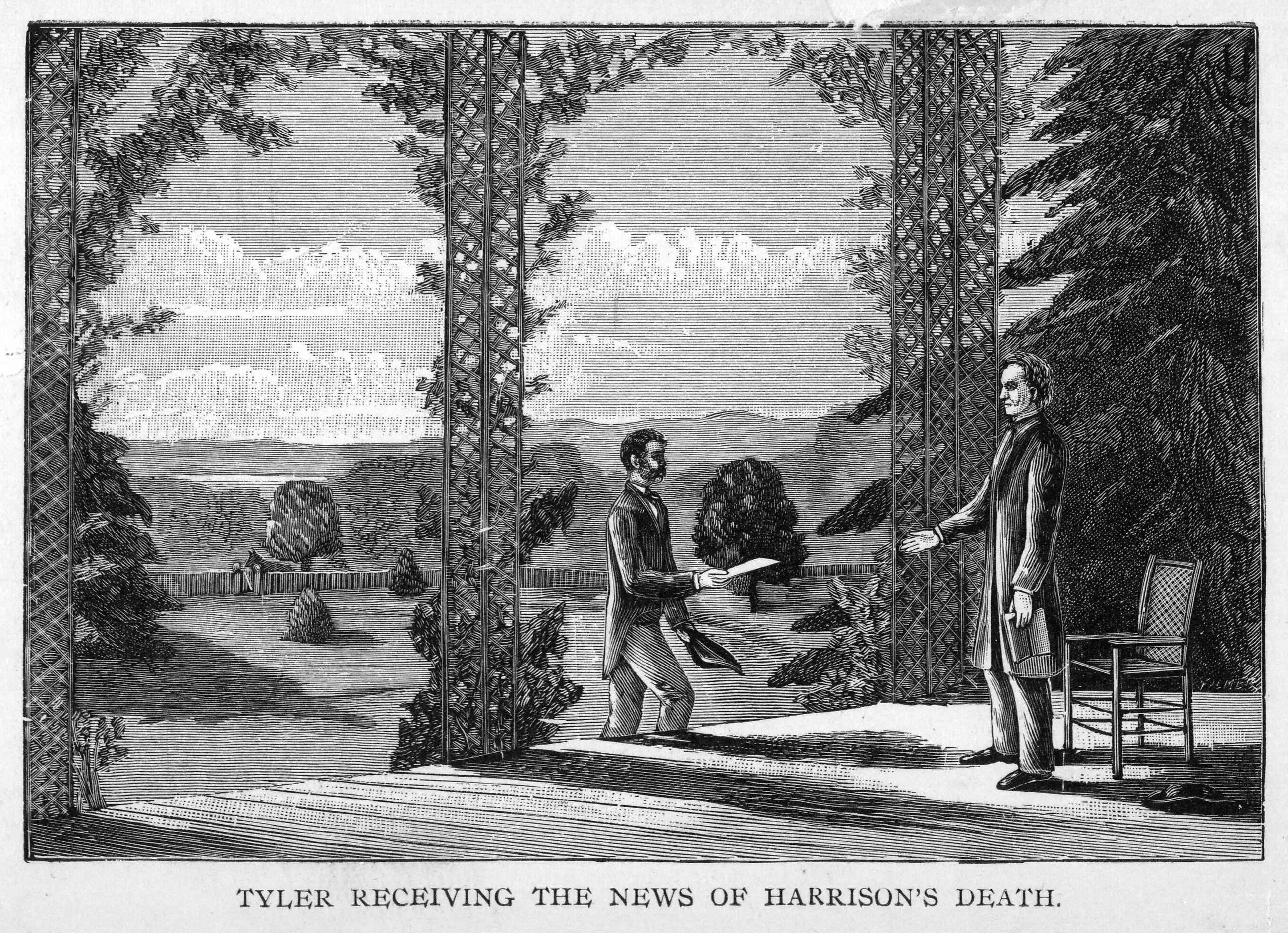
1888 illustration of John Tyler receiving the news of President William Henry Harrison's death from Chief Clerk of the State Department Fletcher Webster

Article II, Section 1, Clause 6 stipulates that the vice president takes over the "powers and duties" of the presidency in the event of a president's removal, death, resignation, or inability. Even so, it did not clearly state whether the vice president became president or simply acted as president in a case of succession. Debate records from the 1787 Constitutional Convention, along with various participants' later writings on the subject, show that the framers of the Constitution intended that the vice president would temporarily exercise the powers and duties of the office in the event of a president's death, disability or removal, but not actually become the president of the United States in their own right.

This understanding was first tested in 1841, following the death of President William Henry Harrison, only 31 days into his term. Harrison's vice president, John Tyler, asserted that under the Constitution, he had succeeded to the presidency, not just to its powers and duties. He had himself sworn in as president and assumed full presidential powers, refusing to acknowledge documents referring to him as "Acting President". Although some in Congress denounced Tyler's claim as a violation of the Constitution, he adhered to his position. His view ultimately prevailed as both the Senate and House voted to acknowledge him as president. The Tyler Precedent that a vice president assumes the full title and role of president upon the death, resignation, or removal from office (via impeachment conviction) of their predecessor was codified through the Twenty-fifth Amendment in 1967. Altogether, nine vice presidents have succeeded to the presidency intra-term. In addition to Tyler, they are Millard Fillmore, Andrew Johnson, Chester A. Arthur, Theodore Roosevelt, Calvin Coolidge, Harry S. Truman, Lyndon B. Johnson, and Gerald Ford. Four of them—Roosevelt, Coolidge, Truman, and Lyndon B. Johnson—were later elected to full terms of their own.

Four sitting vice presidents have been elected president: John Adams in 1796, Thomas Jefferson in 1800, Martin Van Buren in 1836, and George H. W. Bush in 1988. Likewise, two former vice presidents have won the presidency, Richard Nixon in 1968 and Joe Biden in 2020. Five incumbent vice presidents lost a presidential election: Breckinridge in 1860, Nixon in 1960, Humphrey in 1968, Gore in 2000, and Harris in 2024. Likewise, former vice president Walter Mondale lost in 1984. In total, 15 vice presidents have become president.

=== Acting president ===
Sections 3 and 4 of the Twenty-fifth Amendment provide for situations where the president is temporarily or permanently unable to lead, such as if the president has a surgical procedure, becomes seriously ill or injured, or is otherwise unable to discharge the powers or duties of the presidency. Section 3 deals with self-declared incapacity, and Section 4 addresses incapacity declared by the joint action of the vice president and of a majority of the Cabinet. While Section 4 has never been invoked, Section 3 has been invoked on four occasions by three presidents, first in 1985. When invoked on November 19, 2021, Kamala Harris became the first woman in U.S. history to have presidential powers and duties.

Sections 3 and 4 were added because there was ambiguity in the Article II succession clause regarding a disabled president, including what constituted an "inability", who determined the existence of an inability, and if a vice president became president for the rest of the presidential term in the case of an inability or became merely "acting president". During the 19th century and first half of the 20th century, several presidents experienced periods of severe illness, physical disability or injury, some lasting for weeks or months. During these times, even though the nation needed effective presidential leadership, no vice president wanted to seem like a usurper, and so power was never transferred. After President Dwight D. Eisenhower openly addressed his health issues and made it a point to enter into an agreement with Vice President Richard Nixon that provided for Nixon to act on his behalf if Eisenhower became unable to provide effective presidential leadership (Nixon did informally assume some of the president's duties for several weeks on each of three occasions when Eisenhower was ill), discussions began in Congress about clearing up the Constitution's ambiguity on the subject.

== Modern roles ==
The present-day power of the office flows primarily from formal and informal delegations of authority from the president and Congress. These delegations can vary in significance; for example, the vice president is a statutory member of both the National Security Council and the board of regents of the Smithsonian Institution. The extent of the roles and functions of the vice president depend on the specific relationship between the president and the vice president, but often include tasks such as drafter and spokesperson for the administration's policies, adviser to the president, and being a symbol of American concern or support. The influence of the vice president in these roles depends almost entirely on the characteristics of the particular administration.

=== Presidential advisor ===
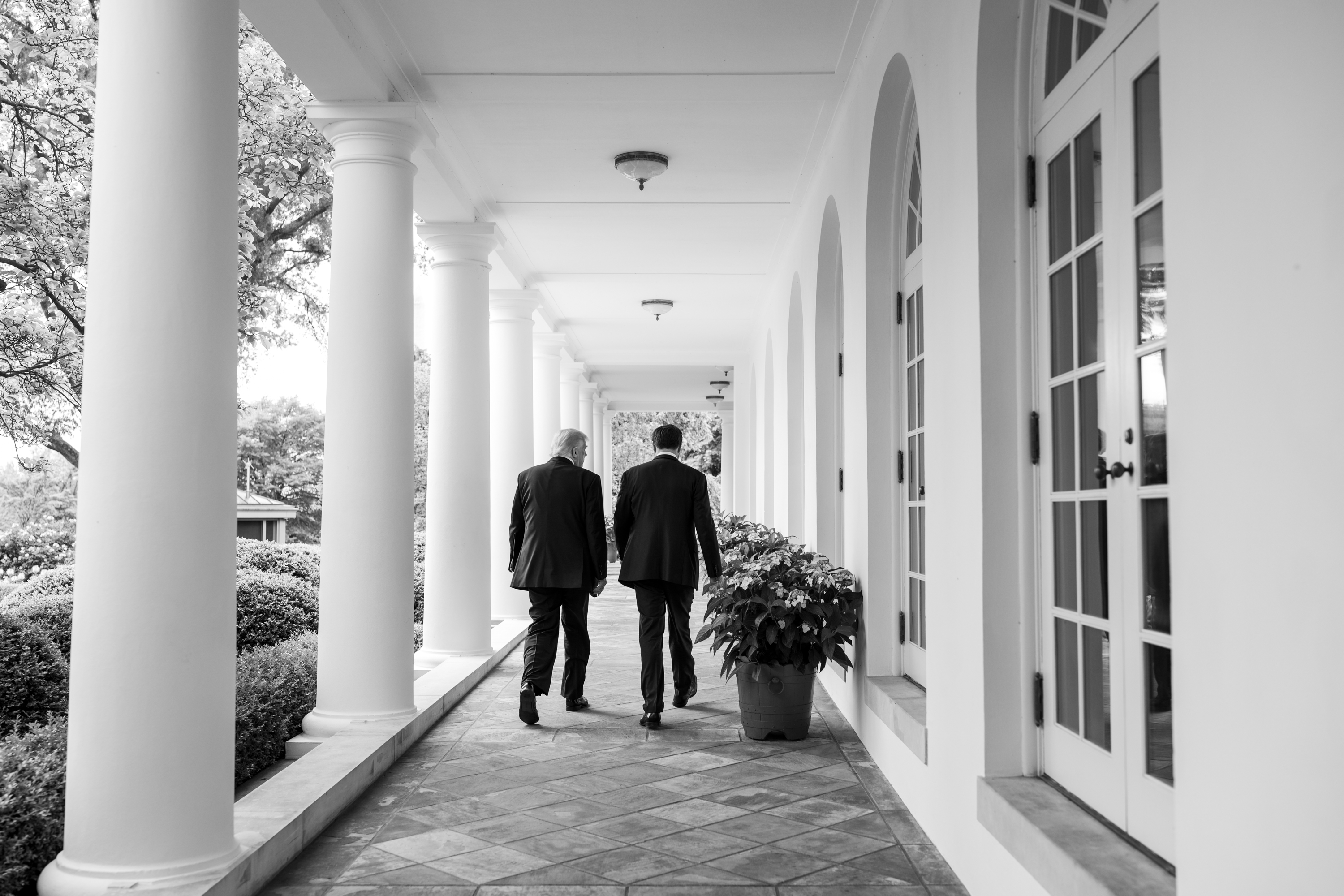
Vice President JD Vance and President Donald Trump, 2025.

Most recent vice presidents have been viewed as important presidential advisors. Walter Mondale, unlike his immediate predecessors, did not want specific responsibilities to be delegated to him. Mondale believed, as he wrote in a memo to President-elect Jimmy Carter following the 1976 election, that his most important role would be as a "general adviser" to the president. Al Gore was an important adviser to President Bill Clinton on matters of foreign policy and the environment. Dick Cheney was widely regarded as one of President George W. Bush's closest confidants. Joe Biden asked President Barack Obama to let him always be the "last person in the room" when a big decision was made; later, as president himself, Biden adopted this model with his own vice president, Kamala Harris.

=== Governing partner ===
Recent vice presidents have been delegated authority by presidents to handle significant issue areas independently. Joe Biden (who has held the office of President and Vice President of the United States) has observed that the presidency is "too big anymore for any one man or woman". Dick Cheney was considered to hold a tremendous amount of power and frequently made policy decisions on his own, without the knowledge of the president. Biden was assigned by Barack Obama to oversee Iraq policy; Obama was said to have said, "Joe, you do Iraq." In February 2020, Donald Trump appointed Mike Pence to lead his response to COVID-19. In March 2021, President Biden put Kamala Harris in charge of addressing the influx of migrants at the U.S.–Mexico border.

=== Congressional liaison ===
The vice president is often an important liaison between the administration and Congress, especially in situations where the president has not previously served in Congress or served only briefly. Vice presidents are often selected as running mates in part due to their legislative relationships, notably including Richard Nixon, Lyndon Johnson, Walter Mondale, Dick Cheney, Joe Biden, and Mike Pence among others. In recent years, Dick Cheney held weekly meetings in the Vice President's Room at the United States Capitol, Joe Biden played a key role in bipartisan budget negotiations, and Mike Pence often met with House and Senate Republicans. Kamala Harris presided over a 50–50 split Senate during the 117th Congress, which provided her with a key role in passing legislation.

=== Representative at events ===
Under the American system of government the president is both head of state and head of government, and the ceremonial duties of the former position are often delegated to the vice president. The vice president will on occasion represent the president and the U.S. government at state funerals abroad, or at various events in the United States. This often is the most visible role of the vice president. The vice president may also meet with other heads of state at times when the administration wishes to demonstrate concern or support but cannot send the president personally.

=== National Security Council member ===
Since 1949, the vice president has legally been a member of the National Security Council. Harry S. Truman, having not been told about any war or post-war plans during his vice presidency (notably the Manhattan Project), recognized that upon assuming the presidency a vice president needed to be already informed on such issues. Modern vice presidents have also been included in the president's daily intelligence briefings and frequently participate in meetings in the Situation Room with the president.

== Selection process ==
=== Eligibility ===
To be constitutionally eligible to serve as the nation's vice president, a person must, according to the Twelfth Amendment, meet the eligibility requirements to become president (which are stated in Article II, Section 1, Clause 5). Thus, to serve as vice president, an individual must:

- be a natural-born U.S. citizen;
- be at least 35 years old;
- be a resident in the U.S. for at least 14 years.

A person who meets the above qualifications is still disqualified from holding the office of vice president under the following conditions:

- Under Article I, Section 3, Clause 7, upon conviction in impeachment cases, the Senate has the option of disqualifying convicted individuals from holding federal office, including that of vice president;
- Under the Twelfth Amendment to the United States Constitution, "no person constitutionally ineligible to the office of President shall be eligible to that of Vice President of the United States".
- Under Section 3 of the Fourteenth Amendment, no person who has sworn an oath to support the Constitution, who has later "engaged in insurrection or rebellion" against the United States, or given aid and comfort to the nation's enemies can serve in a state or federal office—including as vice president. This disqualification, originally aimed at former supporters of the Confederacy, may be removed by a two-thirds vote of each house of the Congress.

=== Nomination ===
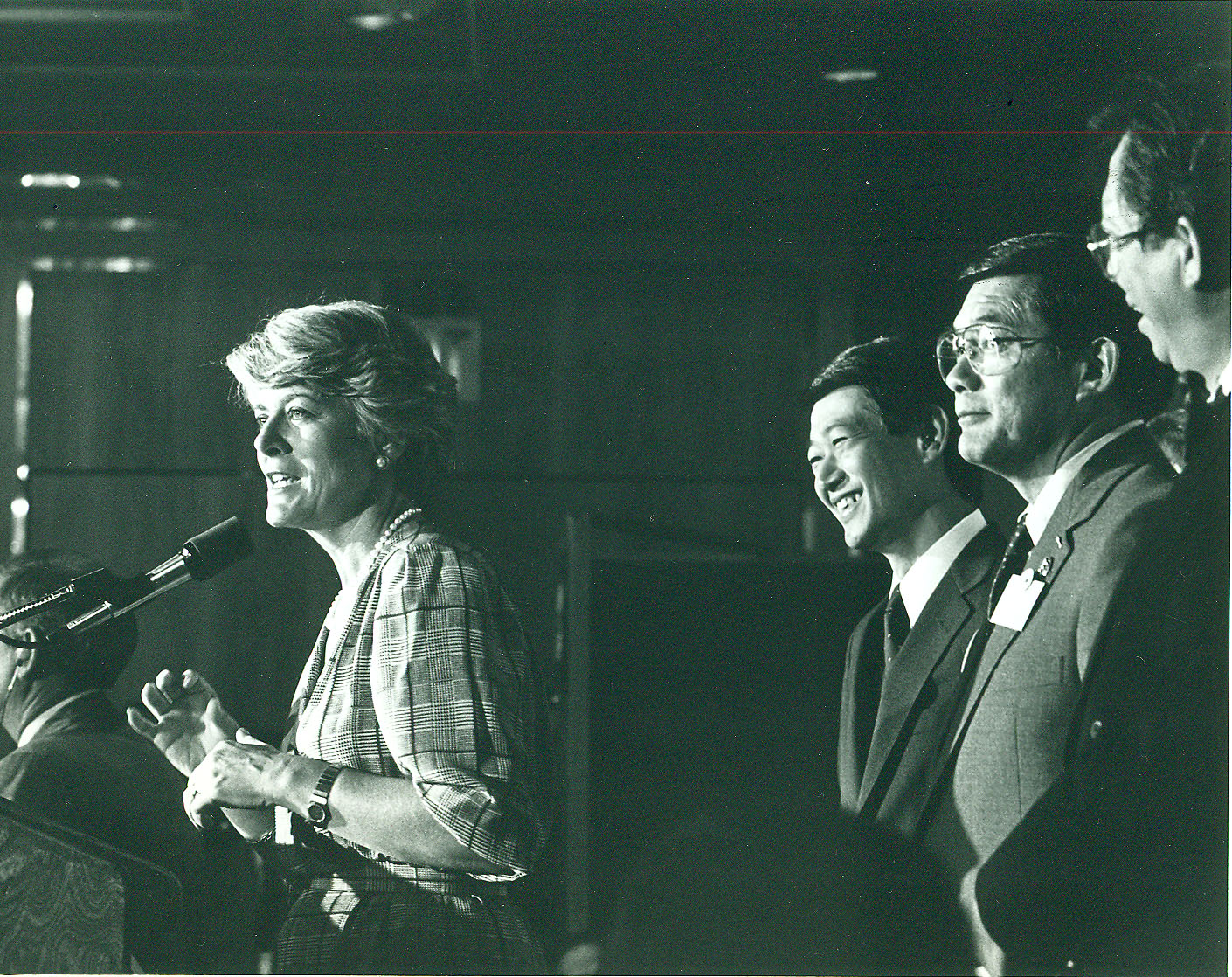
Geraldine Ferraro speaks following her selection as the party's vice presidential nominee.

The vice presidential candidates of the major national political parties are formally selected by each party's quadrennial nominating convention, following the selection of the party's presidential candidate. The official process is identical to the one by which the presidential candidates are chosen, with delegates placing the names of candidates into nomination, followed by a ballot in which candidates must receive a majority to secure the party's nomination.

In modern practice, the presidential nominee has considerable influence on the decision, and since the mid-20th century it became customary for that person to select a preferred running mate, who is then nominated and accepted by the convention. Prior to Franklin D. Roosevelt in 1940, only two presidents—Andrew Jackson in 1832 and Abraham Lincoln in 1864—had done so. In recent years, with the presidential nomination usually being a foregone conclusion as the result of the primary process, the selection of a vice presidential candidate is often announced prior to the actual balloting for the presidential candidate, and sometimes before the beginning of the convention itself. The most recent presidential nominee not to name a vice presidential choice, leaving the matter up to the convention, was Democrat Adlai Stevenson in 1956. The convention chose Tennessee Senator Estes Kefauver over Massachusetts Senator (and later president) John F. Kennedy. At the tumultuous 1972 Democratic convention, presidential nominee George McGovern selected Missouri Senator Thomas Eagleton as his running mate, but numerous other candidates were either nominated from the floor or received votes during the balloting. Eagleton nevertheless received a majority of the votes and the nomination, though he later resigned from the ticket, resulting in Sargent Shriver from Maryland becoming McGovern's final running mate; both lost to the Nixon–Agnew ticket by a wide margin, carrying only Massachusetts and the District of Columbia.

During times in a presidential election cycle before the identity of the presidential nominee is clear, including cases where the presidential nomination is still in doubt as the convention approaches, campaigns for the two positions may become intertwined. In 1976, Ronald Reagan, who was trailing President Gerald Ford in the presidential delegate count, announced prior to the Republican National Convention that, if nominated, he would select Pennsylvania Senator Richard Schweiker as his running mate. Reagan was the first presidential aspirant to announce his selection for vice president before the beginning of the convention. Reagan's supporters then unsuccessfully sought to amend the convention rules so that Gerald Ford would be required to name his vice presidential running mate in advance as well. This move backfired to a degree, as Schweiker's relatively liberal voting record alienated many of the more conservative delegates who were considering a challenge to party delegate selection rules to improve Reagan's chances. In the end, Ford narrowly won the presidential nomination and Reagan's selection of Schweiker became moot.

In the 2008 Democratic presidential primaries, which pitted Hillary Clinton against Barack Obama, Clinton suggested a Clinton–Obama ticket with Obama in the vice president slot, which she said would be "unstoppable" against the presumptive Republican nominee. Obama rejected the offer outright, saying, "I want everybody to be absolutely clear. I'm not running for vice president. I'm running for president of the United States of America," adding, "With all due respect. I won twice as many states as Senator Clinton. I've won more of the popular vote than Senator Clinton. I have more delegates than Senator Clinton. So, I don't know how somebody who's in second place is offering vice presidency to the person who's in first place." Obama said the nomination process would have to be a choice between himself and Clinton, saying "I don't want anybody here thinking that 'Somehow, maybe I can get both'", by nominating Clinton and assuming he would be her running mate. Some suggested that it was a ploy by the Clinton campaign to denigrate Obama as less qualified for the presidency. Later, when Obama became the presumptive Democratic presidential nominee, former president Jimmy Carter cautioned against Clinton being picked as the vice presidential nominee on the ticket, saying "I think it would be the worst mistake that could be made. That would just accumulate the negative aspects of both candidates", citing opinion polls showing 50% of US voters with a negative view of Hillary Clinton.

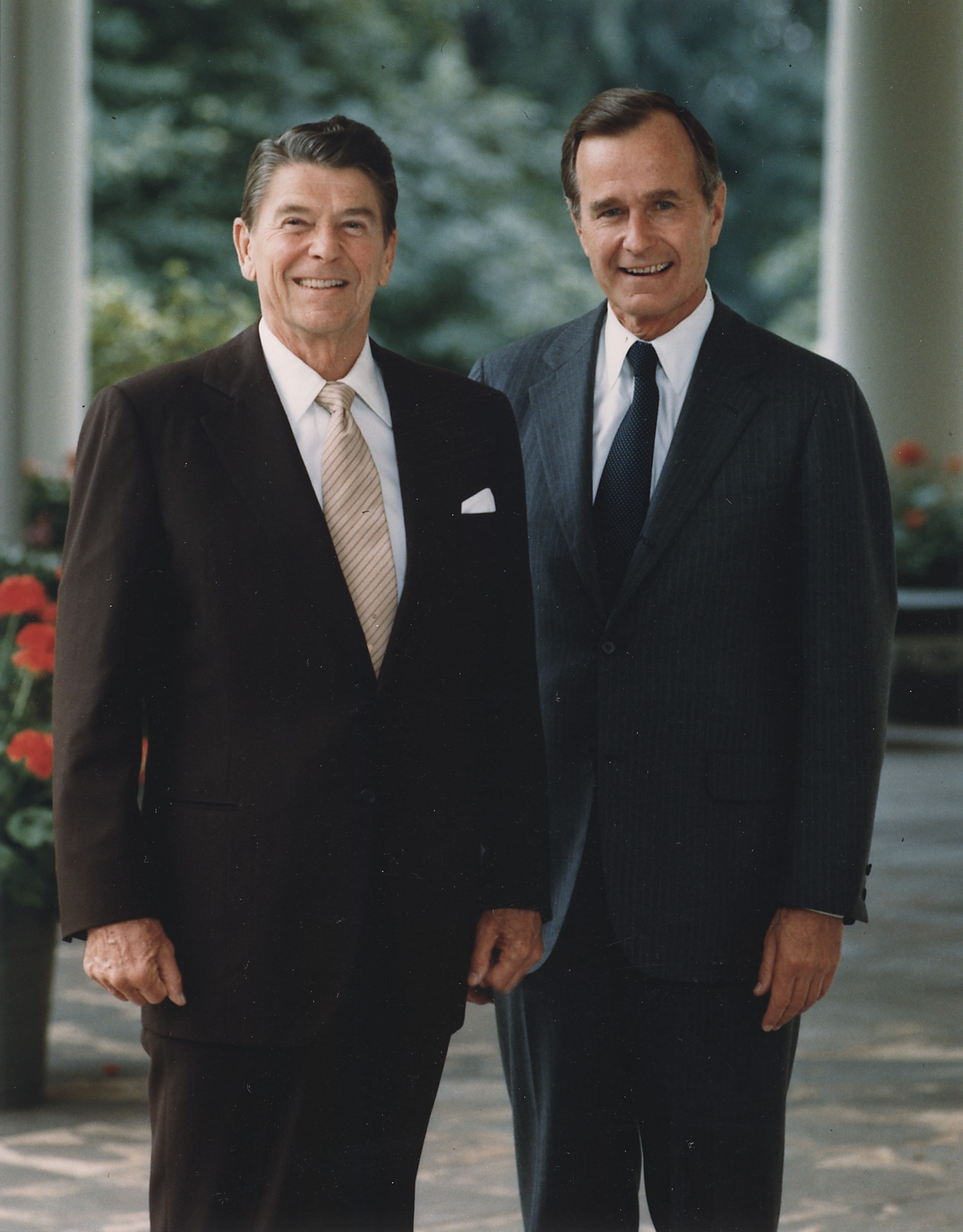
Vice President George H. W. Bush with President Ronald Reagan in 1981.

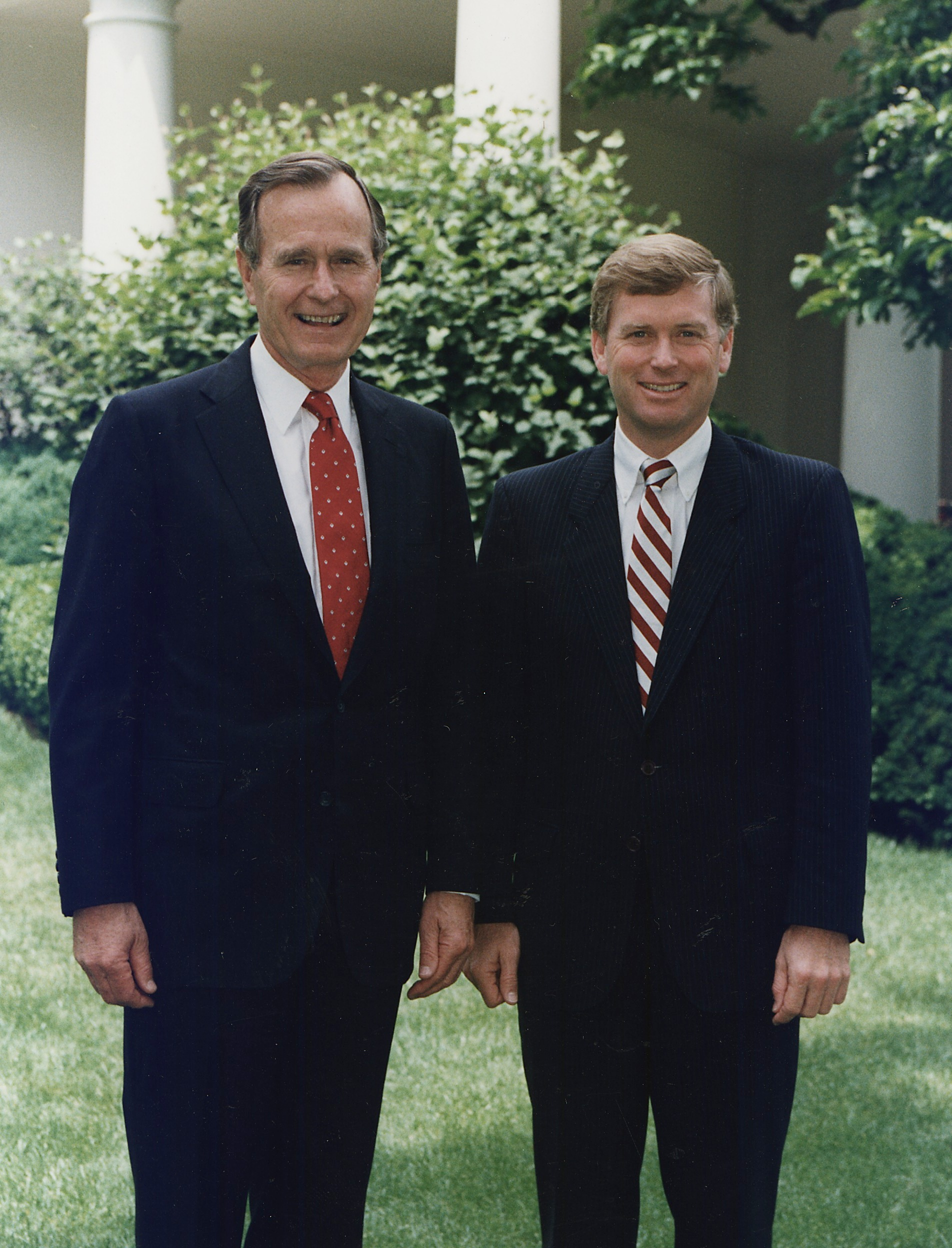
Vice President Dan Quayle with President George H. W. Bush in 1989.

=== Selection criteria ===
Though the vice president does not need to have any political experience, most major-party vice presidential nominees are current or former United States senators or representatives, with the occasional nominee being a current or former governor, a high-ranking former military officer (active military officers being prohibited under US law from holding political office), or a holder of a major position within the Executive branch. In addition, the vice presidential nominee has always been an official resident of a different state than the presidential nominee. While nothing in the Constitution prohibits a presidential candidate and his or her running mate being from the same state, the "inhabitant clause" of the Twelfth Amendment does mandate that every presidential elector must cast a ballot for at least one candidate who is not from their own state. Prior to the 2000 election, both George W. Bush and Dick Cheney lived in and voted in Texas. To avoid creating a potential problem for Texas's electors, Cheney changed his residency back to Wyoming prior to the campaign.

Often, the presidential nominee will name a vice presidential candidate who will bring geographic or ideological balance to the ticket or appeal to a particular constituency. The vice presidential candidate might also be chosen on the basis of traits the presidential candidate is perceived to lack, or on the basis of name recognition. To foster party unity, popular runners-up in the presidential nomination process are commonly considered. While this selection process may enhance the chances of success for a national ticket, in the past it often resulted in the vice presidential nominee representing regions, constituencies, or ideologies at odds with those of the presidential candidate. As a result, vice presidents were often excluded from the policy-making process of the new administration. Many times their relationships with the president and his staff were aloof, non-existent, or even adversarial.

Historically, the vice presidential nominee was usually a second-tier politician, chosen either to appease the party's minority faction, satisfy party bosses, or to secure a key state. Factors playing a role in the selection included: geographic and ideological balance, widening a presidential candidate's appeal to voters from outside their regional base or wing of the party. Candidates from electoral-vote rich swing states were usually preferred. A 2016 study, which examined vice-presidential candidates over the period 1884–2012, found that vice presidential candidates increased their tickets’ performance in their home states by 2.67 percentage points on average.

=== Election ===
Map of the United States showing the number of electoral votes allocated following the 2020 United States census to each state and the District of Columbia for the 2024 and 2028 presidential elections. 270 electoral votes are required for a majority out of 538 votes possible.

The vice president is elected indirectly by the voters of each state and the District of Columbia through the Electoral College, a body of electors formed every four years for the sole purpose of electing the president and vice president to concurrent four-year terms. Each state is entitled to a number of electors equal to the size of its total delegation in both houses of Congress. Additionally, the Twenty-third Amendment provides that the District of Columbia is entitled to the number it would have if it were a state, but in no case more than that of the least populous state. Currently, all states and D.C. select their electors based on a popular election held on Election Day. In all but two states, the party whose presidential–vice presidential ticket receives a plurality of popular votes in the state has its entire slate of elector nominees chosen as the state's electors. Maine and Nebraska deviate from this winner-take-all practice, awarding two electors to the statewide winner and one to the winner in each congressional district.

On the first Monday after the second Wednesday in December, about six weeks after the election, the electors convene in their respective states (and in Washington D.C.) to vote for president and, on a separate ballot, for vice president. The certified results are opened and counted during a joint session of Congress, held in the first week of January. A candidate who receives an absolute majority of electoral votes for vice president (currently 270 of 538) is declared the winner. If no candidate has a majority, the Senate must meet to elect a vice president using a contingent election procedure in which senators, casting votes individually, choose between the two candidates who received the most electoral votes for vice president. For a candidate to win the contingent election, they must receive votes from an absolute majority of senators (currently 51 of 100).

There has been only one vice presidential contingent election since the process was created by the Twelfth Amendment. It occurred on February 8, 1837, after no candidate received a majority of the electoral votes cast for vice president in the 1836 election. By a 33–17 vote, Richard M. Johnson (Martin Van Buren's running mate) was elected the nation's ninth vice president over Francis Granger (William Henry Harrison's and Daniel Webster's running mate).

== Tenure ==
=== Inauguration ===
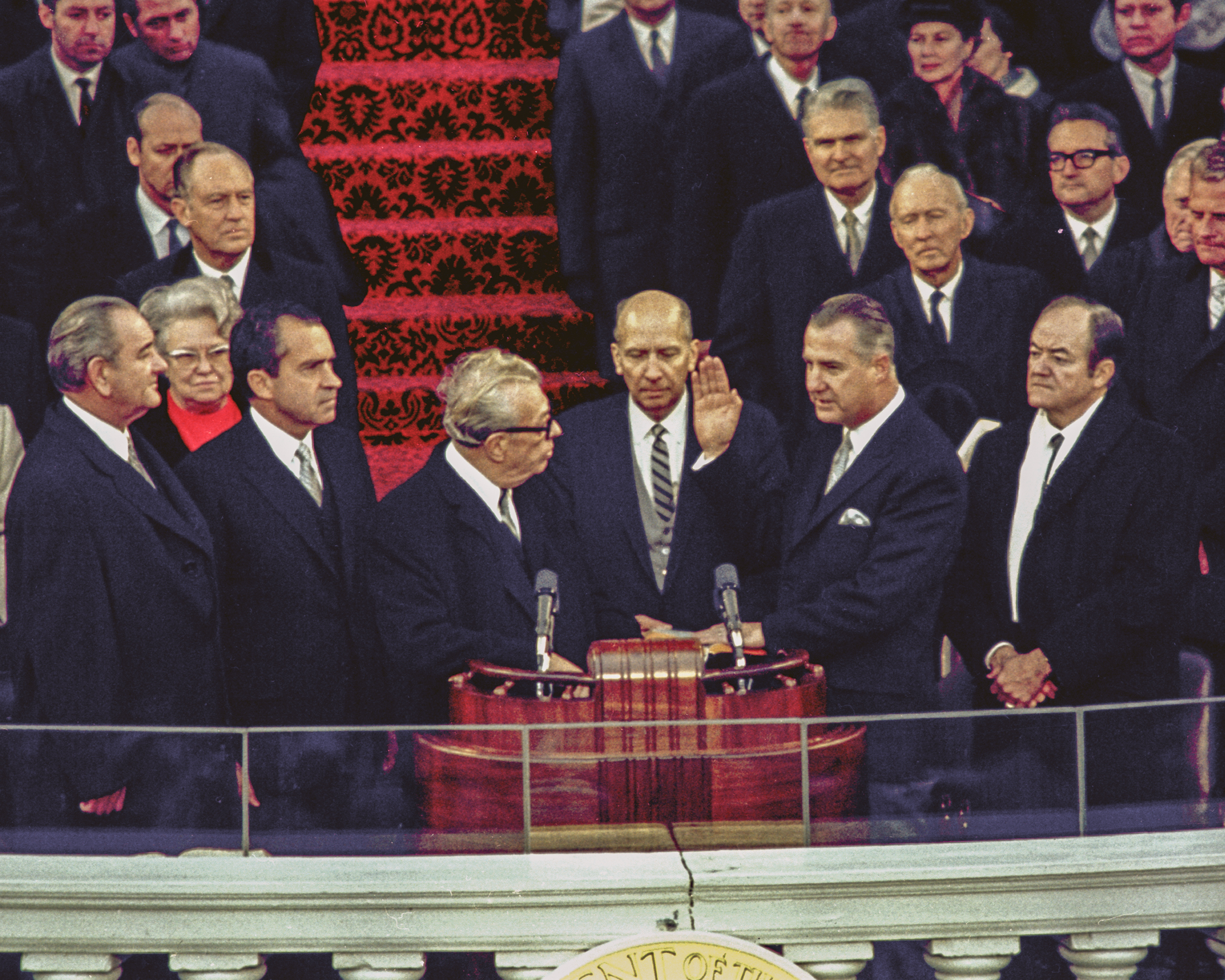
Four vice presidents: (from left) outgoing president Lyndon B. Johnson (the 37th vice president), incoming president Richard Nixon (36th), (Everett Dirksen administering oath), incoming vice president Spiro Agnew (39th), and outgoing vice president Hubert Humphrey (38th), January 20, 1969

Pursuant to the Twentieth Amendment, the vice president's term of office begins at noon on January 20, as does the president's. The first presidential and vice presidential terms to begin on this date, known as Inauguration Day, were the second terms of President Franklin D. Roosevelt and Vice President John Nance Garner in 1937. Previously, Inauguration Day was on March 4. As a result of the date change, both men's first terms (1933–1937) were short of four years by 43 days.

Also in 1937, the vice president's swearing-in ceremony was held on the Inaugural platform on the Capitol's east front immediately before the president's swearing in. Up until then, most vice presidents took the oath of office in the Senate chamber, prior to the president's swearing-in ceremony. Although the Constitution contains the specific wording of the presidential oath, it contains only a general requirement, in Article VI, that the vice president and other government officers shall take an oath or affirmation to support the Constitution. The current form, which has been used since 1884 reads:

I, (first name last name), do solemnly swear (or affirm) that I will support and defend the Constitution of the United States against all enemies, foreign and domestic; that I will bear true faith and allegiance to the same; that I take this obligation freely, without any mental reservation or purpose of evasion; and that I will well and faithfully discharge the duties of the office on which I am about to enter. So help me God.

=== Term of office ===
The term of office for both the vice president and the president is four years. While the Twenty-Second Amendment sets a limit on the number of times an individual can be elected to the presidency (two), there is no such limitation on the office of vice president, meaning an eligible person could hold the office as long as voters continued to vote for electors who in turn would reelect the person to the office; one could even serve under different presidents. This has happened twice: George Clinton (1805–1812) served under both Thomas Jefferson and James Madison; and John C. Calhoun (1825–1832) served under John Quincy Adams and Andrew Jackson. Additionally, neither the Constitution's eligibility provisions nor the Twenty-second Amendment's presidential term limit explicitly disqualify a twice-elected president from serving as vice president, though it is arguably prohibited by the last sentence of the Twelfth Amendment: "But no person constitutionally ineligible to the office of President shall be eligible to that of Vice-President of the United States." As of the 2024 election cycle, however, no former president has tested the amendment's legal restrictions or meaning by running for the vice presidency.

=== Impeachment ===
Article II, Section 4 of the Constitution allows for the removal of federal officials, including the vice president, from office for "treason, bribery, or other high crimes and misdemeanors". No vice president has ever been impeached.

=== Vacancies ===
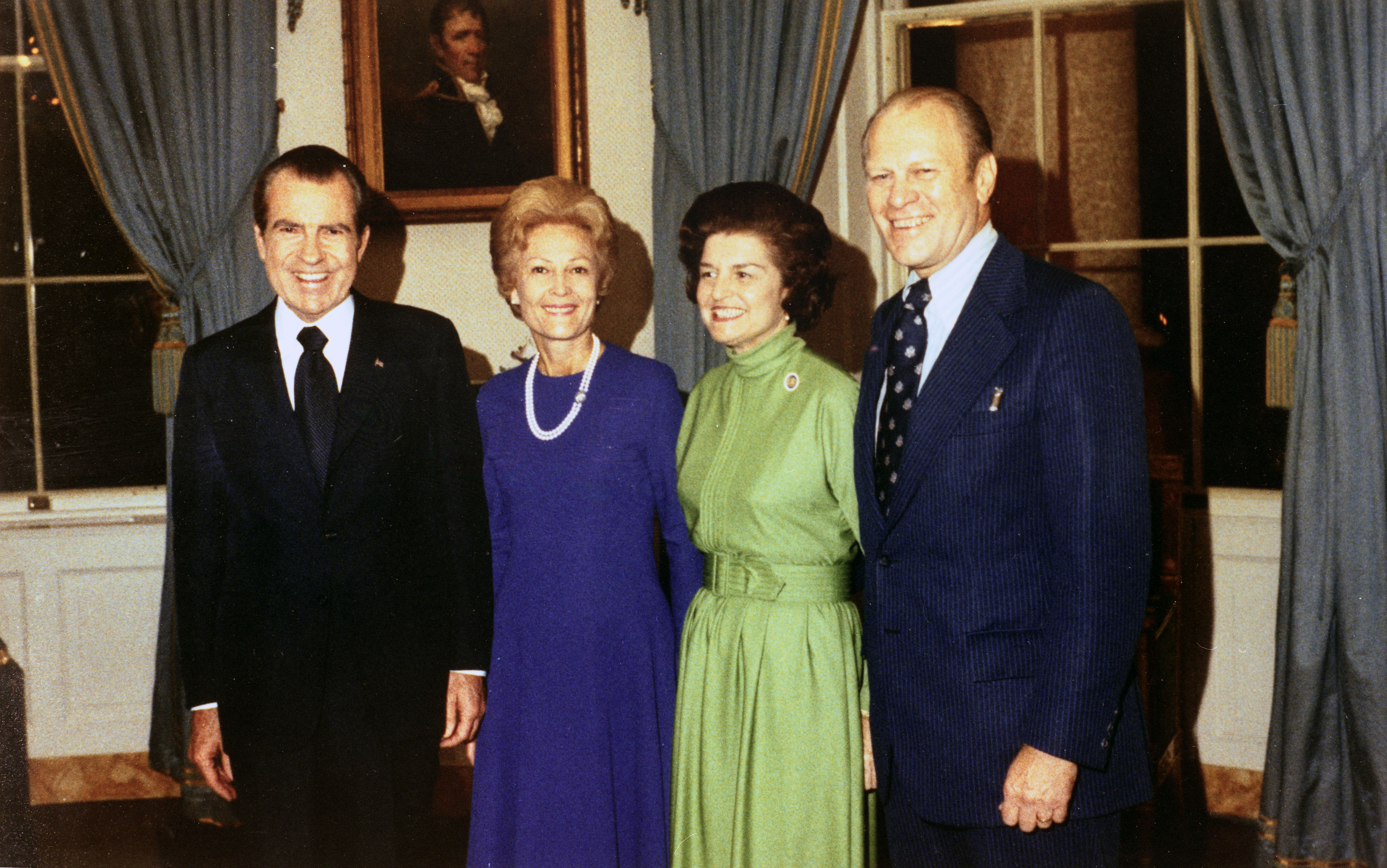
(Left to right) President Richard Nixon, First Lady Pat Nixon, Betty Ford and Representative Gerald Ford after President Nixon nominated Ford to be vice president, October 13, 1973

Prior to the ratification of the Twenty-fifth Amendment in 1967, no constitutional provision existed for filling an intra-term vacancy in the vice presidency.

As a result, when such a vacancy occurred, the office was left vacant until filled through the next ensuing election and inauguration. Between 1812 and 1965, the vice presidency was vacant on sixteen occasions, as a result of seven deaths, one resignation, and eight cases of the vice president succeeding to the presidency. With the vacancy that followed the succession of Lyndon B. Johnson in 1963, the nation had been without a vice president for a cumulative total of 37 years.

Section 2 of the Twenty-fifth Amendment provides that "whenever there is a vacancy in the office of the Vice President, the President shall nominate a Vice President who shall take office upon confirmation by a majority vote of both Houses of Congress." This procedure has been implemented twice since the amendment came into force: the first instance occurred in 1973 following the October 10 resignation of Spiro Agnew, when Gerald Ford was nominated by President Richard Nixon and confirmed by Congress. The second occurred ten months later on August 9, 1974, on Ford's accession to the presidency upon Nixon's resignation, when Nelson Rockefeller was nominated by President Ford and confirmed by Congress.

Had it not been for this new constitutional mechanism, the vice presidency would have remained vacant after Agnew's resignation; the speaker of the House, Carl Albert, would have become Acting President had Nixon resigned in this scenario, under the terms of the Presidential Succession Act of 1947.

Vice presidential vacancies
| No. | Period of vacancy | Cause of vacancy | Length | Vacancy filled by |
|---|---|---|---|---|
| 1 | April 20, 1812 – March 4, 1813 | Death of George Clinton | 318 days | Election of 1812 |
| 2 | November 23, 1814 – March 4, 1817 | Death of Elbridge Gerry | 2 years, 101 days | Election of 1816 |
| 3 | December 28, 1832 – March 4, 1833 | Resignation of John C. Calhoun | 66 days | Election of 1832 |
| 4 | April 4, 1841 – March 4, 1845 | Accession of John Tyler as president | 3 years, 334 days | Election of 1844 |
| 5 | July 9, 1850 – March 4, 1853 | Accession of Millard Fillmore as president | 2 years, 238 days | Election of 1852 |
| 6 | April 18, 1853 – March 4, 1857 | Death of William R. King | 3 years, 320 days | Election of 1856 |
| 7 | April 15, 1865 – March 4, 1869 | Accession of Andrew Johnson as president | 3 years, 323 days | Election of 1868 |
| 8 | November 22, 1875 – March 4, 1877 | Death of Henry Wilson | 1 year, 102 days | Election of 1876 |
| 9 | September 19, 1881 – March 4, 1885 | Accession of Chester A. Arthur as president | 3 years, 166 days | Election of 1884 |
| 10 | November 25, 1885 – March 4, 1889 | Death of Thomas A. Hendricks | 3 years, 99 days | Election of 1888 |
| 11 | November 21, 1899 – March 4, 1901 | Death of Garret Hobart | 1 year, 103 days | Election of 1900 |
| 12 | September 14, 1901 – March 4, 1905 | Accession of Theodore Roosevelt as president | 3 years, 171 days | Election of 1904 |
| 13 | October 30, 1912 – March 4, 1913 | Death of James S. Sherman | 125 days | Election of 1912 |
| 14 | August 2, 1923 – March 4, 1925 | Accession of Calvin Coolidge as president | 1 year, 214 days | Election of 1924 |
| 15 | April 12, 1945 – January 20, 1949 | Accession of Harry S. Truman as president | 3 years, 283 days | Election of 1948 |
| 16 | November 22, 1963 – January 20, 1965 | Accession of Lyndon B. Johnson as president | 1 year, 59 days | Election of 1964 |
| 17 | October 10, 1973 – December 6, 1973 | Resignation of Spiro Agnew | 57 days | Confirmation of successor |
| 18 | August 9, 1974 – December 19, 1974 | Accession of Gerald Ford as president | 132 days | Confirmation of successor |

== Office and status ==
=== Salary ===
The vice president's salary in 2019 was $235,100. For 2024, the vice president's salary is $284,600, however, due to a pay freeze in effect since 2019, the actual portion of that salary that is payable remains $235,100. The salary was set by the 1989 Government Salary Reform Act, which also provides an automatic cost of living adjustment for federal employees. The vice president does not automatically receive a pension based on that office, but instead receives the same pension as other members of Congress based on their position as president of the Senate. The vice president must serve a minimum of two years to qualify for a pension.

=== Residence ===
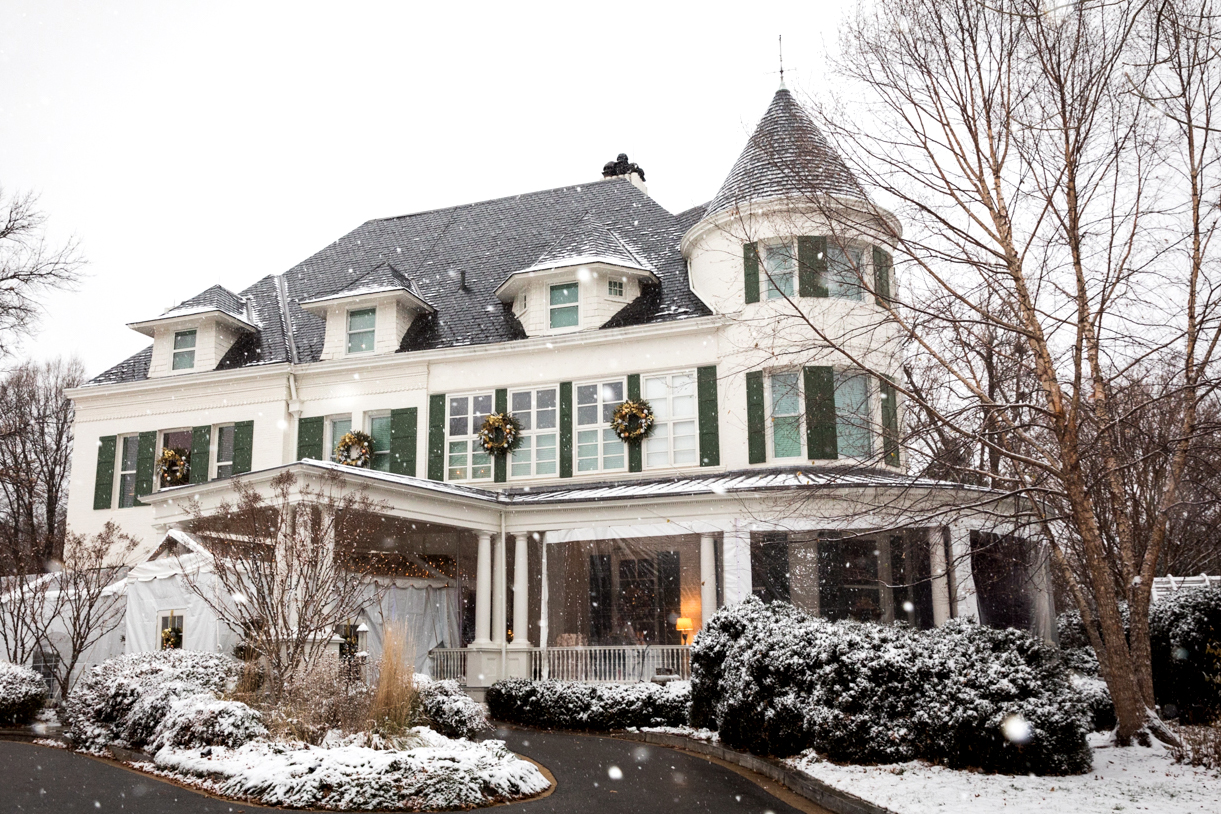
Number One Observatory Circle, Washington D.C., the official residence of the vice president

The home of the vice president was designated in 1974, when Congress established Number One Observatory Circle as the official temporary residence of the vice president of the United States. In 1966, Congress, concerned about safety and security, and mindful of the increasing responsibilities of the office, allotted money ($75,000) to fund construction of a residence for the vice president, but implementation stalled. After eight years, the decision was revised, and One Observatory Circle was then designated for the vice president. Up until the change, vice presidents lived in rented homes, apartments, or hotels, mostly in Washington, D.C., and were compensated more like cabinet members and members of Congress, receiving only a housing allowance.

The three-story Queen Anne style mansion was built in 1893 on the grounds of the U.S. Naval Observatory in Washington, D.C. to serve as residence for the superintendent of the Observatory. In 1923, the residence was reassigned to be the home of the Chief of Naval Operations (CNO), which it was until it was turned over to the office of the vice president fifty years later.

=== Travel and transportation ===
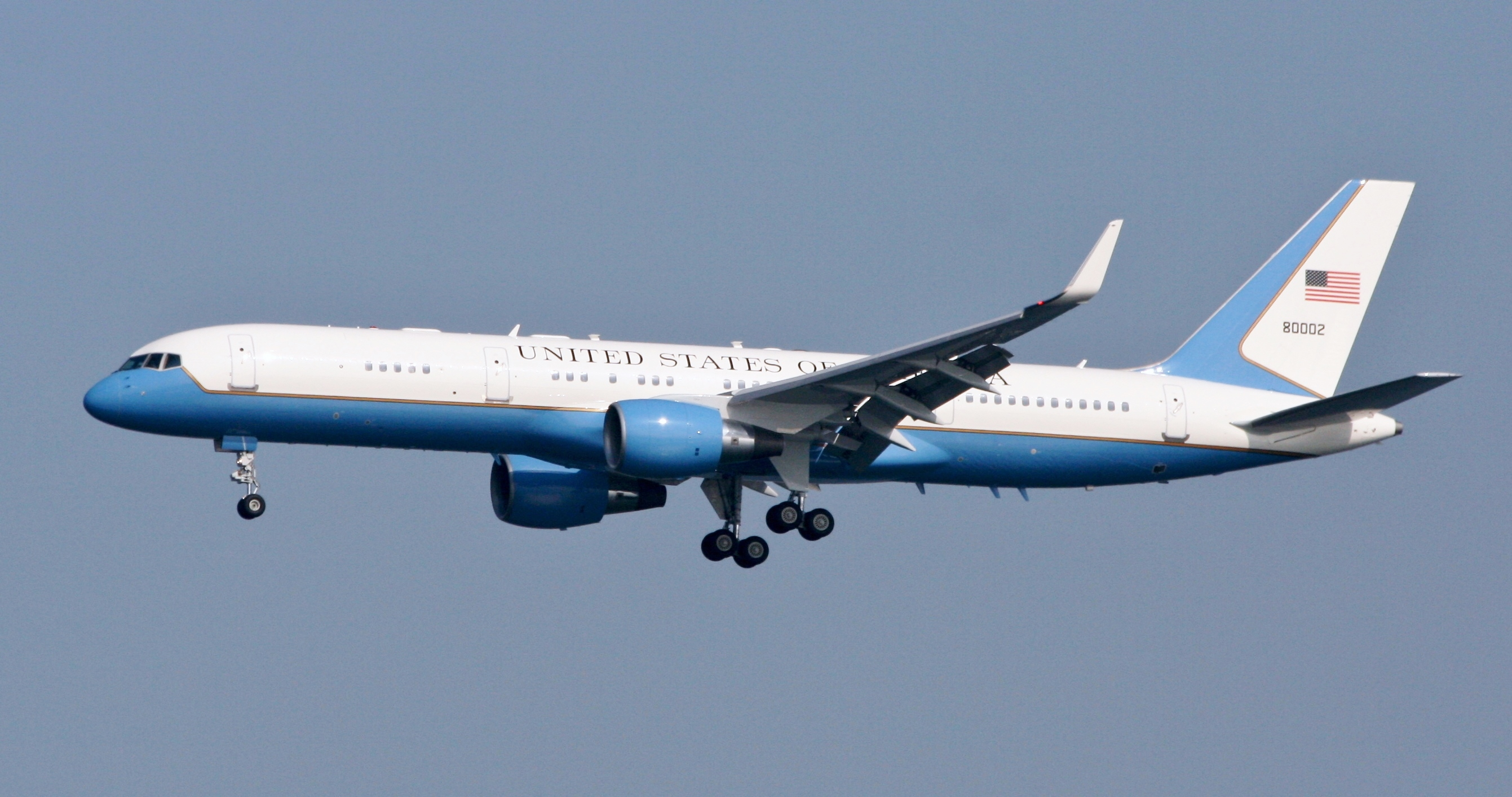
Air Force Two, the official vice presidential aircraft, carrying the vice president

The primary means of long-distance air travel for the vice president is one of two identical Boeing airplanes, which are extensively modified Boeing 757 airliners and are referred to as Air Force Two, while the vice president is on board. Any U.S. Air Force aircraft the vice president is aboard is referred to as "Air Force Two" for the duration of the flight. In-country trips are typically handled with just one of the two planes, while overseas trips are handled with both, one primary and one backup.

For short-distance air travel, the vice president has access to a fleet of U.S. Marine Corps helicopters of varying models including Marine Two when the vice president is aboard any particular one in the fleet. Flights are typically handled with as many as five helicopters all flying together and frequently swapping positions as to disguise which helicopter the vice president is actually aboard to any would-be threats.

=== Staff ===
The vice president is supported by personnel in the Office of the Vice President of the United States. The office was created in the Reorganization Act of 1939, which included an "office of the Vice President" under the Executive Office of the President. Salary for the staff is provided by both legislative and executive branch appropriations, in light of the vice president's roles in each branch.

=== Protection ===
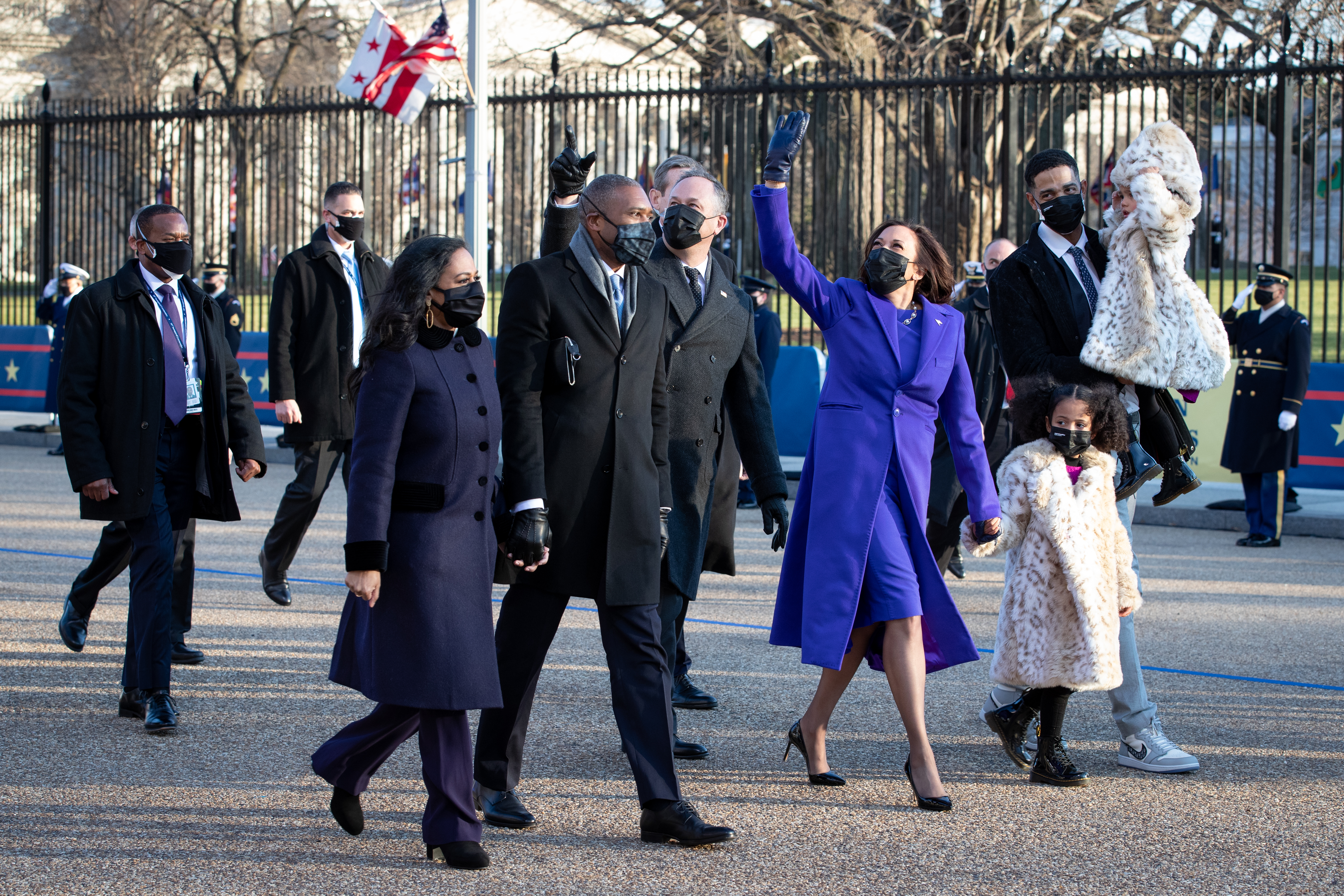
Vice President Kamala Harris, surrounded by members of her family and Secret Service

The U.S. Secret Service is charged with protecting the vice president and the second family. As part of their protection, vice presidents, second spouses, their children and other immediate family members, and other prominent persons and locations are assigned Secret Service codenames. The use of such names was originally due to security purposes and safety reasons.

=== Office spaces ===
In the modern era, the vice president makes use of at least five different office spaces. These include an office in the West Wing, a ceremonial office in the Eisenhower Executive Office Building near where most of the vice president's staff works, the Vice President's Room on the Senate side of the United States Capitol for meetings with members of Congress, an office in the Dirksen Senate Office Building, and an office at the vice president's residence.

== Post–vice presidency ==
Since 1977, former presidents and former vice presidents who are elected or re-elected to the Senate are entitled to the largely honorific position of Deputy President pro tempore. To date, the only former vice president to have held this title is Hubert Humphrey. Also, under the terms of an 1886 Senate resolution, all former vice presidents are entitled to a portrait bust in the Senate wing of the United States Capitol, commemorating their service as presidents of the Senate. Dick Cheney is the most recently serving vice president in the collection.

Unlike former presidents, whose pension is fixed at the same rate, regardless of their time in office, former vice presidents receive their retirement income based on their role as president of the Senate. Additionally, since 2008, each former vice president and their immediate family is entitled (under the Former Vice President Protection Act of 2008) to Secret Service protection for up to six months after leaving office, and again temporarily at any time thereafter if warranted.

== Timeline ==
Graphical timeline listing the vice presidents of the United States:

U.S. presidential line of succession
| Preceded by None | 1st in line | Succeeded by Speaker of the House of Representatives; Mike Johnson |
