= 1974 United States vice presidential confirmation =

- December 10, 1974 (Senate); December 19, 1974 (House)

100 and 435 members of the Senate and House Majority of both Senate and House votes needed to win
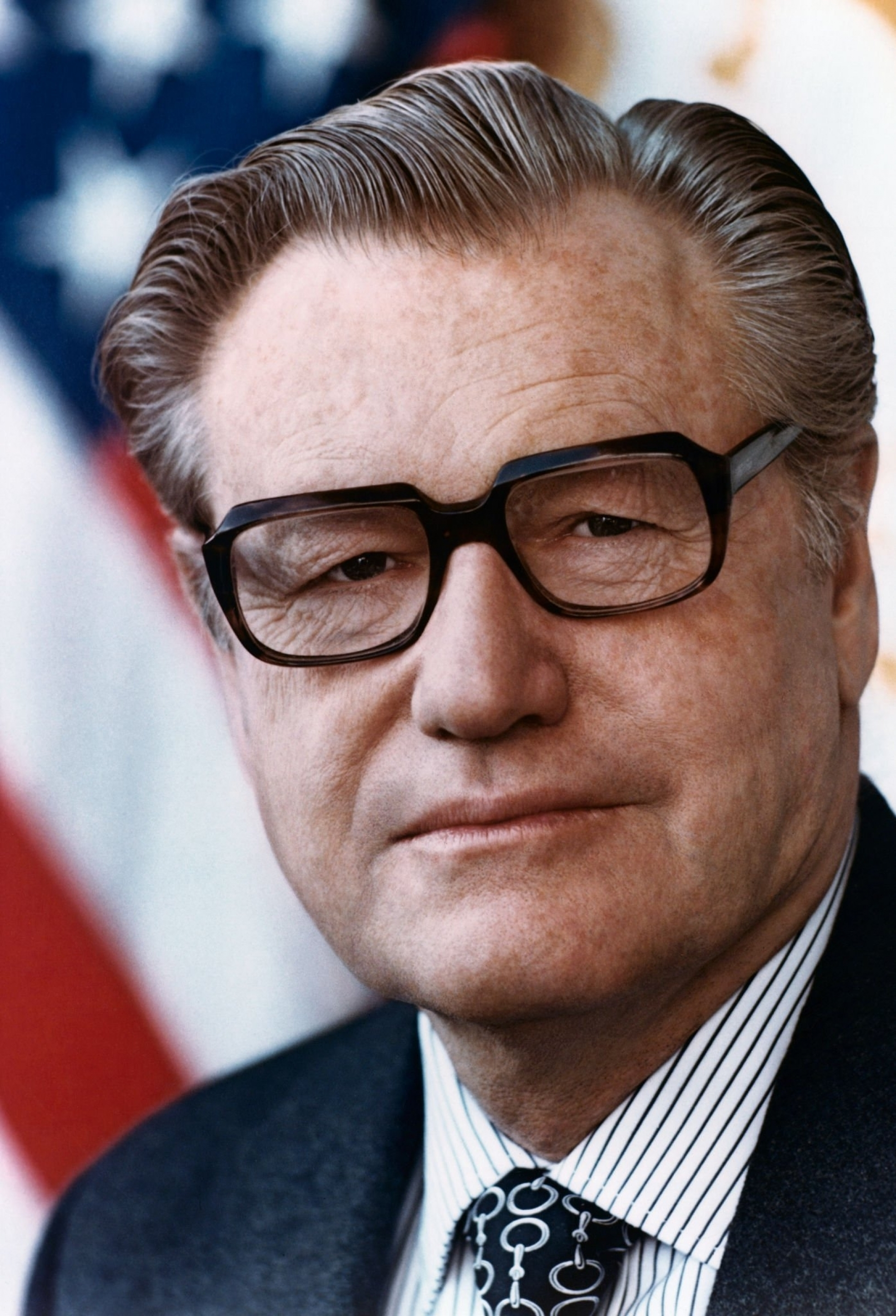
Nominee	Nelson Rockefeller
Party	Republican
Home state	New York
Electoral vote	90 (Senate); 287 (House)
Percentage	92.8% (Senate); 69.2% (House)
Vice President before election
Gerald Ford
Confirmed Vice President
Nelson Rockefeller

On August 9, 1974, President Richard Nixon (a Republican) resigned amid the Watergate scandal. Vice President Gerald Ford ascended to the presidency, leaving the office of vice president vacant. Under the terms of the Twenty-fifth Amendment to the United States Constitution, a vice presidential vacancy is filled when the president nominates a candidate who is confirmed by both houses of Congress, which were controlled by the Democrats.

On August 20, 1974, Ford announced his nomination of former New York Governor Nelson Rockefeller to fill the vacancy. Ford also considered picking Tennessee Senator Howard Baker and then-U.S. Liaison Chief to China George H. W. Bush. Rockefeller was generally considered to be a liberal Republican, and Ford decided that picking Rockefeller would help his candidacy gain support in the 1976 presidential election. Rockefeller's nomination dismayed many conservatives; many conservative Democrats and Republicans opposed the nomination. This was especially true among members of the U.S. House of Representatives. However, some House opponents were liberal Democrats who looked askance at some minor improprieties disclosed during Rockefeller's confirmation hearings and whose partisanship had been hardened due to the leftover effects from the political and psychological trauma of Watergate.

The confirmation hearings for Rockefeller lasted for months, but Rockefeller was sworn in as the 41st vice president of the United States on December 19, 1974. Due to the pressure on Ford by the party hardliners, Rockefeller was ultimately passed over for the 1976 ticket, and Ford instead chose Kansas Senator Bob Dole as his running mate. Ford, however, regretted this move later.

== Confirmation votes ==
By a vote of 90 to 7 on December 10, 1974, the Senate confirmed the nomination of Nelson Rockefeller. Among those opposing and voting against Rockefeller's confirmation were 3 conservative Republicans: Barry Goldwater, Jesse Helms, and William L. Scott. The following week, on December 19, the House of Representatives gave its approval, 287 to 128.

1974 U.S. Senate Vice presidential confirmation vote:	Party				Total votes	
1974 U.S. Senate Vice presidential confirmation vote:		Democratic	Republican	Conservative	Total votes	Independent
Yes	52	36	1	1	90 (92.8%)	
No	4	3	0	0	7 (7.2%)	
Result: Confirmed
Roll call vote on the nomination: Senator / Party / State / Vote; James Abourezk / D / South Dakota / Nay; George Aiken / R / Vermont / Yea; James Allen / D / Alabama / Yea; Howard Baker / R / Tennessee / Yea; Dewey Bartlett / R / Oklahoma / Yea; Birch Bayh / D / Indiana / Nay; John Glenn Beall / R / Maryland / Yea; Henry Bellmon / R / Oklahoma / No vote; Wallace Bennett / R / Utah / Yea; Lloyd Bentsen / D / Texas / Yea; Alan Bible / D / Nevada / Yea; Joe Biden / D / Delaware / Yea; Bill Brock / R / Tennessee / Yea; Edward Brooke / R / Massachusetts / Yea; James L. Buckley / C / New York / Yea; Quentin Burdick / D / North Dakota / Yea; Harry F. Byrd / I / Virginia / Yea; Robert Byrd / D / West Virginia / Yea; Howard Cannon / D / Nevada / Yea; Clifford Case / R / New Jersey / Yea; Lawton Chiles / D / Florida / Yea; Frank Church / D / Idaho / Yea; Dick Clark / D / Iowa / Yea; Marlow Cook / R / Kentucky / Yea; Norris Cotton / R / New Hampshire / Yea; Alan Cranston / D / California / Yea; Carl Curtis / R / Nebraska / Yea; Bob Dole / R / Kansas / Yea; Pete Domenici / R / New Mexico / Yea; Peter Dominick / R / Colorado / Present; Thomas Eagleton / D / Missouri / Yea; James Eastland / D / Mississippi / Yea; Sam Ervin / D / North Carolina / Yea; Paul Fannin / R / Arizona / Yea; Hiram Fong / R / Hawaii / Yea; J. William Fulbright / D / Arkansas / Yea; Barry Goldwater / R / Arizona / Nay; Mike Gravel / D / Alaska / Yea; Robert P. Griffin / R / Michigan / Yea; Edward Gurney / R / Florida / Yea; Clifford Hansen / R / Wyoming / Yea; Philip Hart / D / Michigan / Yea; Vance Hartke / D / Indiana / Yea; Floyd Haskell / D / Colorado / Yea; Mark Hatfield / R / Oregon / Yea; William Hathaway / D / Maine / Yea; Jesse Helms / R / North Carolina / Nay; Fritz Hollings / D / South Carolina / Yea; Roman Hruska / R / Nebraska / Yea; Walter Dee Huddleston / D / Kentucky / Yea; Harold Hughes / D / Iowa / Yea; Hubert Humphrey / D / Minnesota / Yea; Daniel Inouye / D / Hawaii / Yea; Henry M. Jackson / D / Washington / Yea; Jacob Javits / R / New York / Yea; J. Bennett Johnston / D / Louisiana / Yea; Ted Kennedy / D / Massachusetts / Yea; Russell B. Long / D / Louisiana / Yea; Warren Magnuson / D / Washington / Yea; Mike Mansfield / D / Montana / No vote; Charles Mathias / R / Maryland / Yea; John L. McClellan / D / Arkansas / Yea; James A. McClure / R / Idaho / Yea; Gale McGee / D / Wyoming / Yea; George McGovern / D / South Dakota / Yea; Thomas J. McIntyre / D / New Hampshire / Yea; Lee Metcalf / D / Montana / Yea; Howard Metzenbaum / D / Ohio / Nay; Walter Mondale / D / Minnesota / Yea; Joseph Montoya / D / New Mexico / Yea; Frank Moss / D / Utah / Yea; Edmund Muskie / D / Maine / Yea; Gaylord Nelson / D / Wisconsin / Nay; Sam Nunn / D / Georgia / Yea; Bob Packwood / R / Oregon / Yea; John Pastore / D / Rhode Island / Yea; James B. Pearson / R / Kansas / Yea; Claiborne Pell / D / Rhode Island / Yea; Charles H. Percy / R / Illinois / Yea; William Proxmire / D / Wisconsin / Yea; Jennings Randolph / D / West Virginia / Yea; Abraham Ribicoff / D / Connecticut / Yea; William Roth / R / Delaware / Yea; Richard Schweiker / R / Pennsylvania / Yea; Hugh Scott / R / Pennsylvania / Yea; William L. Scott / R / Virginia / Nay; John Sparkman / D / Alabama / Yea; Robert Stafford / R / Vermont / Yea; John C. Stennis / D / Mississippi / Yea; Ted Stevens / R / Alaska / Yea; Adlai Stevenson / D / Illinois / Yea; Stuart Symington / D / Missouri / Yea; Robert A. Taft / R / Ohio / Yea; Herman Talmadge / D / Georgia / Yea; Strom Thurmond / R / South Carolina / Yea; John Tower / R / Texas / Yea; John V. Tunney / D / California / Yea; Lowell Weicker / R / Connecticut / Yea; Harrison A. Williams / D / New Jersey / Yea; Milton Young / R / North Dakota / Yea

1974 U.S. House Vice presidential confirmation vote:	Party		Total votes	
1974 U.S. House Vice presidential confirmation vote:		Democratic	Total votes	Republican
Yes	134	153	287 (69.2%)	
No	98	30	128 (30.8%)	
Result: Confirmed

== See also ==
- Twenty-fifth Amendment to the United States Constitution
- 1973 United States vice presidential confirmation
