= 1973 United States vice presidential confirmation =

- November 27, 1973 (Senate); December 6, 1973 (House)

100 and 435 members of the Senate and House Majority of both Senate and House votes needed to win
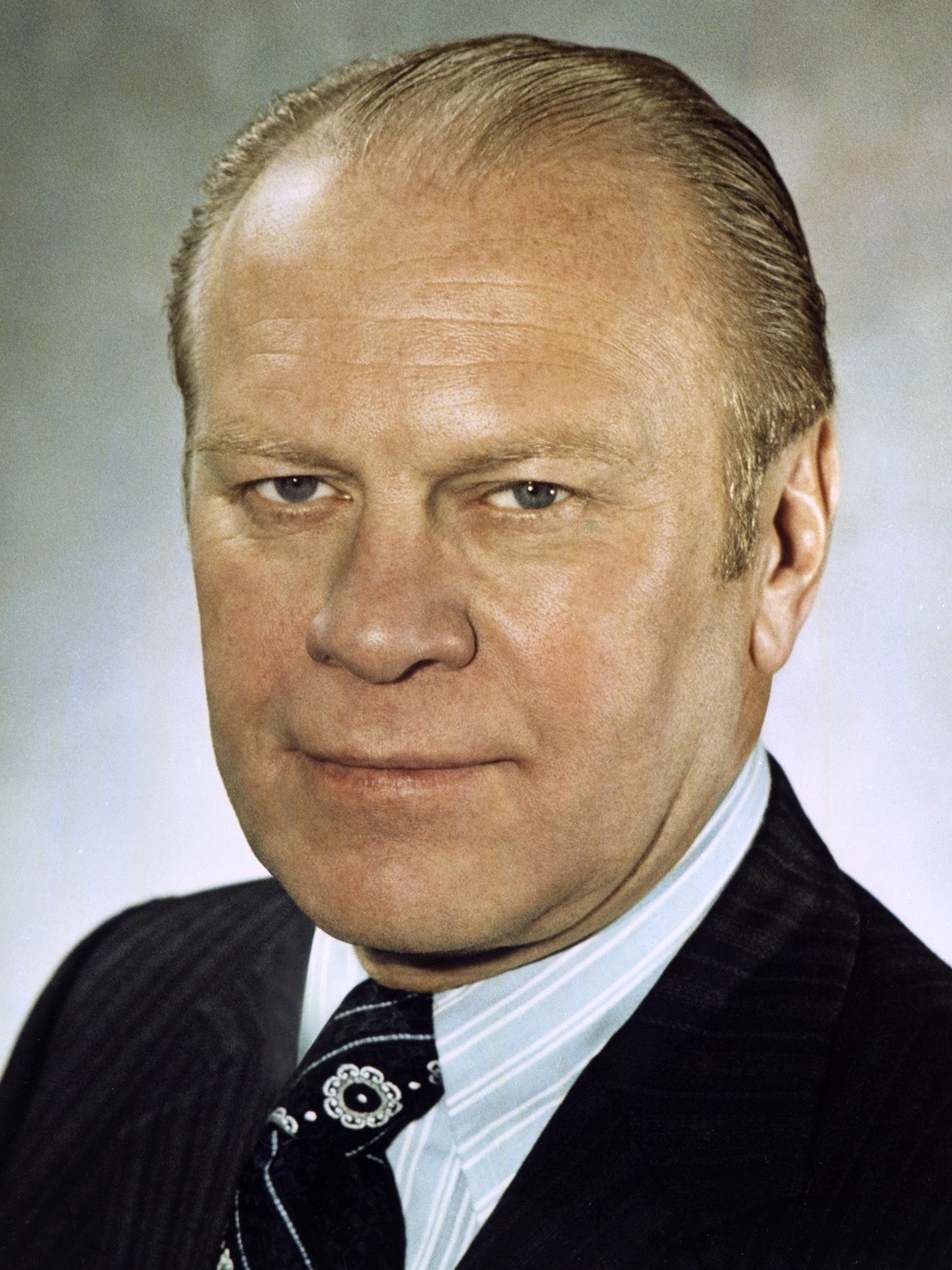
Nominee	Gerald Ford
Party	Republican
Home state	Michigan
Electoral vote	92 (Senate); 387 (House)
Percentage	96.8% (Senate); 91.7% (House)
- Vote by house district Republican "Aye" Democratic "Aye" Democratic "No" Absent/Not voting
Vice President before election
Spiro Agnew
Confirmed Vice President
Gerald Ford

On October 10, 1973, Vice President Spiro Agnew resigned following a controversy over his personal taxes. Under the terms of the Twenty-fifth Amendment to the United States Constitution, a vice presidential vacancy is filled when the president nominates a candidate who is confirmed by both houses of Congress. President Richard Nixon thus had the task of selecting a vice president who could receive the majority support of both houses of Congress, which were then controlled by the Democrats.

President Nixon considered selecting former Texas Governor and Treasury Secretary John Connally, New York Governor Nelson Rockefeller, and California Governor Ronald Reagan. However, Nixon settled on House Minority Leader Gerald Ford of Michigan, a moderate Republican who was popular among the members of Congress in both parties and who was good friends with Nixon. Ford won the approval of both houses by huge margins and was sworn in as the 40th vice president of the United States on December 6, 1973.

On August 9, 1974, Ford ascended to the presidency after the Watergate scandal led to the resignation of President Nixon, becoming the only president in American history to have never been elected president or vice president. (Note: Other vice presidents have ascended to the presidency, but had been elected on a party ticket as running mate.)

== Confirmation votes ==
By a vote of 92 to 3 on November 27, 1973, the Senate confirmed the nomination of Gerald Ford. The following week, on December 6, the House of Representatives gave its approval, 387 to 35.

Ford assumed office the same day, taking the oath of office in a joint session of Congress.

1973 U.S. Senate Vice presidential confirmation vote:	Party				Total votes	
1973 U.S. Senate Vice presidential confirmation vote:		Democratic	Republican	Conservative	Total votes	Independent
Yes	51	39	1	1	92 (96.8%)	
No	3	0	0	0	3 (3.2%)	
Result: Confirmed
Roll call vote on the nomination: Senator / Party / State / Vote; James Abourezk / D / South Dakota / Yea; George Aiken / R / Vermont / Yea; James Allen / D / Alabama / Yea; Howard Baker / R / Tennessee / Yea; Dewey Bartlett / R / Oklahoma / Yea; Birch Bayh / D / Indiana / Yea; John Glenn Beall / R / Maryland / Yea; Henry Bellmon / R / Oklahoma / Yea; Wallace Bennett / R / Utah / Yea; Lloyd Bentsen / D / Texas / Yea; Alan Bible / D / Nevada / Yea; Joe Biden / D / Delaware / Yea; Bill Brock / R / Tennessee / Yea; Edward Brooke / R / Massachusetts / Yea; James L. Buckley / C / New York / Yea; Quentin Burdick / D / North Dakota / Yea; Harry F. Byrd / I / Virginia / Yea; Robert Byrd / D / West Virginia / Yea; Howard Cannon / D / Nevada / Yea; Clifford Case / R / New Jersey / Yea; Lawton Chiles / D / Florida / Yea; Frank Church / D / Idaho / Yea; Dick Clark / D / Iowa / Yea; Marlow Cook / R / Kentucky / Yea; Norris Cotton / R / New Hampshire / Yea; Alan Cranston / D / California / Yea; Carl Curtis / R / Nebraska / Yea; Bob Dole / R / Kansas / Yea; Pete Domenici / R / New Mexico / Yea; Peter Dominick / R / Colorado / Yea; Thomas Eagleton / D / Missouri / Nay; James Eastland / D / Mississippi / Yea; Sam Ervin / D / North Carolina / Yea; Paul Fannin / R / Arizona / No vote; Hiram Fong / R / Hawaii / Yea; J. William Fulbright / D / Arkansas / Yea; Barry Goldwater / R / Arizona / Yea; Mike Gravel / D / Alaska / Yea; Robert P. Griffin / R / Michigan / Yea; Edward Gurney / R / Florida / No vote; Clifford Hansen / R / Wyoming / Yea; Philip Hart / D / Michigan / Yea; Vance Hartke / D / Indiana / Yea; Floyd Haskell / D / Colorado / Yea; Mark Hatfield / R / Oregon / Yea; William Hathaway / D / Maine / Nay; Jesse Helms / R / North Carolina / Yea; Fritz Hollings / D / South Carolina / Yea; Roman Hruska / R / Nebraska / Yea; Walter Dee Huddleston / D / Kentucky / Yea; Harold Hughes / D / Iowa / Yea; Hubert Humphrey / D / Minnesota / Yea; Daniel Inouye / D / Hawaii / Yea; Henry M. Jackson / D / Washington / Yea; Jacob Javits / R / New York / Yea; J. Bennett Johnston / D / Louisiana / Yea; Ted Kennedy / D / Massachusetts / Yea; Russell B. Long / D / Louisiana / Yea; Warren Magnuson / D / Washington / Yea; Mike Mansfield / D / Montana / Yea; Charles Mathias / R / Maryland / Yea; John L. McClellan / D / Arkansas / Yea; James A. McClure / R / Idaho / No vote; Gale McGee / D / Wyoming / Yea; George McGovern / D / South Dakota / No vote; Thomas J. McIntyre / D / New Hampshire / Yea; Lee Metcalf / D / Montana / Yea; Walter Mondale / D / Minnesota / Yea; Joseph Montoya / D / New Mexico / Yea; Frank Moss / D / Utah / Yea; Edmund Muskie / D / Maine / Yea; Gaylord Nelson / D / Wisconsin / Nay; Sam Nunn / D / Georgia / Yea; Bob Packwood / R / Oregon / Yea; John Pastore / D / Rhode Island / Yea; James B. Pearson / R / Kansas / Yea; Claiborne Pell / D / Rhode Island / Yea; Charles H. Percy / R / Illinois / Yea; William Proxmire / D / Wisconsin / Yea; Jennings Randolph / D / West Virginia / Yea; Abraham Ribicoff / D / Connecticut / Yea; William Roth / R / Delaware / Yea; William Saxbe / R / Ohio / Yea; Richard Schweiker / R / Pennsylvania / Yea; Hugh Scott / R / Pennsylvania / Yea; William L. Scott / R / Virginia / Yea; John Sparkman / D / Alabama / Yea; Robert Stafford / R / Vermont / Yea; John C. Stennis / D / Mississippi / Yea; Ted Stevens / R / Alaska / Yea; Adlai Stevenson / D / Illinois / Yea; Stuart Symington / D / Missouri / No vote; Robert A. Taft / R / Ohio / Yea; Herman Talmadge / D / Georgia / Yea; Strom Thurmond / R / South Carolina / Yea; John Tower / R / Texas / Yea; John V. Tunney / D / California / Yea; Lowell Weicker / R / Connecticut / Yea; Harrison A. Williams / D / New Jersey / Yea; Milton Young / R / North Dakota / Yea

1973 U.S. House Vice presidential confirmation vote:	Party		Total votes	
1973 U.S. House Vice presidential confirmation vote:		Democratic	Total votes	Republican
Yes	199	188	387 (91.7%)	
No	35	0	35 (8.3%)	
Result: Confirmed

== See also ==
- Twenty-fifth Amendment to the United States Constitution
- 1974 United States vice presidential confirmation
